= Liberation Movement (music group) =

American hip hop group

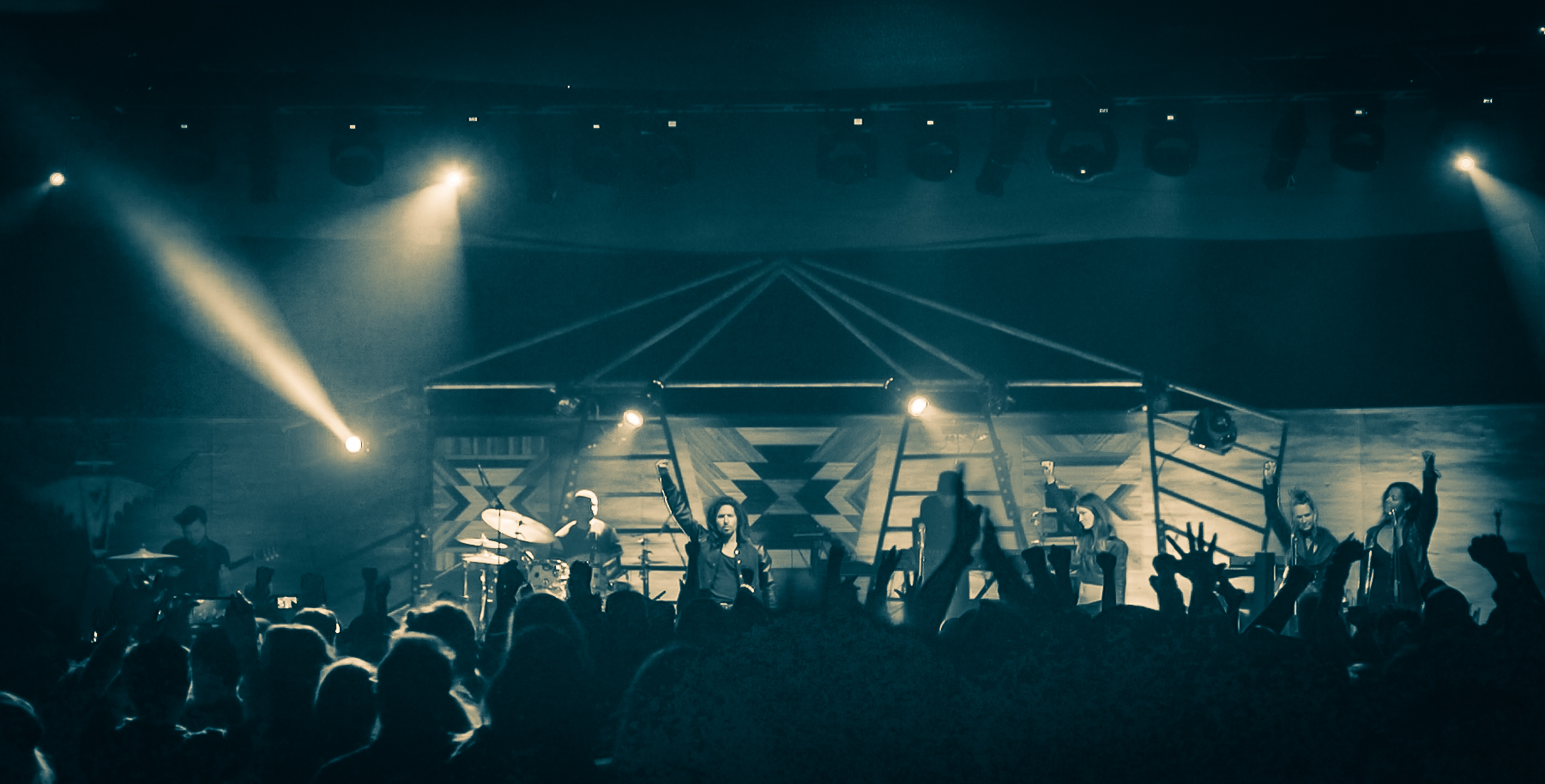
- Liberation Movement performing at the Joshua Tree Music Festival 2017

Background information
- Origin: San Francisco
- Genres: Dub, electro-industrial, electronica, hip hop, reggae fusion, trip hop, and world music
- Years active: 2010 – present
- Labels: Champion Nation Recordings
- Members: Resurrector, Noah King, James Small, Wailer B, Sasha Rose, El Suchi, Lux Moderna, Olivia Ruff, Soriah, and Shamans Of The Temple of the Way of Light
- Website: Liberation-Movement.com

Liberation Movement is a music and artist collective founded in 2010 by Resurrector (Grant Chambers) in San Francisco, California. Liberation Movement evolved out of San Francisco-based underground music project Heavyweight Dub Champion. The collective has become known for its live performances and as of 2020 has not officially released any recorded material. They have performed at many music festivals throughout the Americas. Reality Sandwich calls Liberation Movement "a new collaborative music project that pushes the boundaries of human experience". Jambase described their 2013 Symbiosis Gathering performance as "one of the most moving, mind-blowing musical experiences in recent memory."

== Formation ==
Liberation Movement was created among a wide variety of ambitious goals : "to bring greater appreciation for process", "to redefine the way our culture relates to age and wisdom", and "to truly generate the possibility of personal and collective evolution". Chambers explains in an interview with Reality Sandwich:

The project was seeded at the Temple of the Way of Light in the Peruvian Amazon, at which point I was recruited to work with and create recordings of shamans in traditional ceremonies in Peru. From that foundation, I wanted to start gathering artists and musicians that represent 'archetypal gateways'; veterans in different musical fields whose goal is to connect with the deepest life journey.

He says he chose the name because "speaking the name is a revolutionary potential in and of itself.

== Peruvian Connection ==
In 2010, Chambers "went to Peru to learn about how music and vibration are connected to shamanism". This led to him recording more than 25 indigenous singers from the Shipibo Tribe at the Temple Of The Way Of Light near Iquitos, Peru and produce and release the album Onáyabaon Bewá - Messages from Mother Earth by Shamans of the Temple of the Way of Light. This experience also led to a rebranding of Liberation Movement.

In 2014, in collaboration with Peruvian-based NGO Alianza Arkana and the Rubin Foundation, he returned to Peru with bandmates Sasha Rose, Noah King and filmmakers Mitch Schultz (Writer/Director of DMT: The Spirit Molecule), Donald Schultz and Jason Gamble Harter to document a 3-week journey to the Peruvian Amazon.

=== "Jiwexon Axebo" Concert in Pucallpa ===
Liberation Movement teamed up with Alianza Arkana and ORAU (the regional political organization of the National Federation of Amazonian Indigenous Peoples) on a concert event held in Pucallpa, Peru called "Jiwexon Axebo" in the Shipibo Tribe's language and "Cultural Revival" in English. The Shipibo traditional singers Maestro Diogenes Garcia and Maestro Olivia Arevalo performed with Liberation Movement.

=== Olivia Arévalo Lomas ===
Often heralded as the leader and "spiritual mother" of the indigenous Shipibo-konibo community, Maestra Olivia Arévalo Lomas who both performed and recorded with Liberation Movement was tragically murdered in April 2018 at her home. She is featured on the Resurrector produced album Onáyabaon Bewá – Messages from Mother Earth.

== Live performance ==
Liberation Movement has received many accolades for its live performances and they have performed at festivals including Lightning in a Bottle, Symbiosis Gathering, Sonic Bloom, Joshua Tree Music Festival, Envision in Costa Rica, Atmosphere Gathering in Canada and many others. A review by Everfest of their performance at the Oregon Eclipse Festival in 2017 stated that Liberation Movement "shone brightest among the Earth Stage's magnificent programming ... Resurrector himself, Grant Chambers, provided a veritable séance in deep dubby beat-science ... This was a spiritualized journey that burrowed many thousands of leagues beneath the Earth's surface, penetrating the consciousness of all who had assembled."

Liberation Movement live performances often feature a wide variety of collaborators and guests from varied genres including Peruvian shamans, champion Tuvan throat singer Soriah, Butoh dance troupe Bad Unkl Sista, SORNE and many others.

Liberation Movement is ultimately a gathering of gatekeeper archetypes, coming together to usher in a new form of liberation technology through music and vibration

— Resurrector

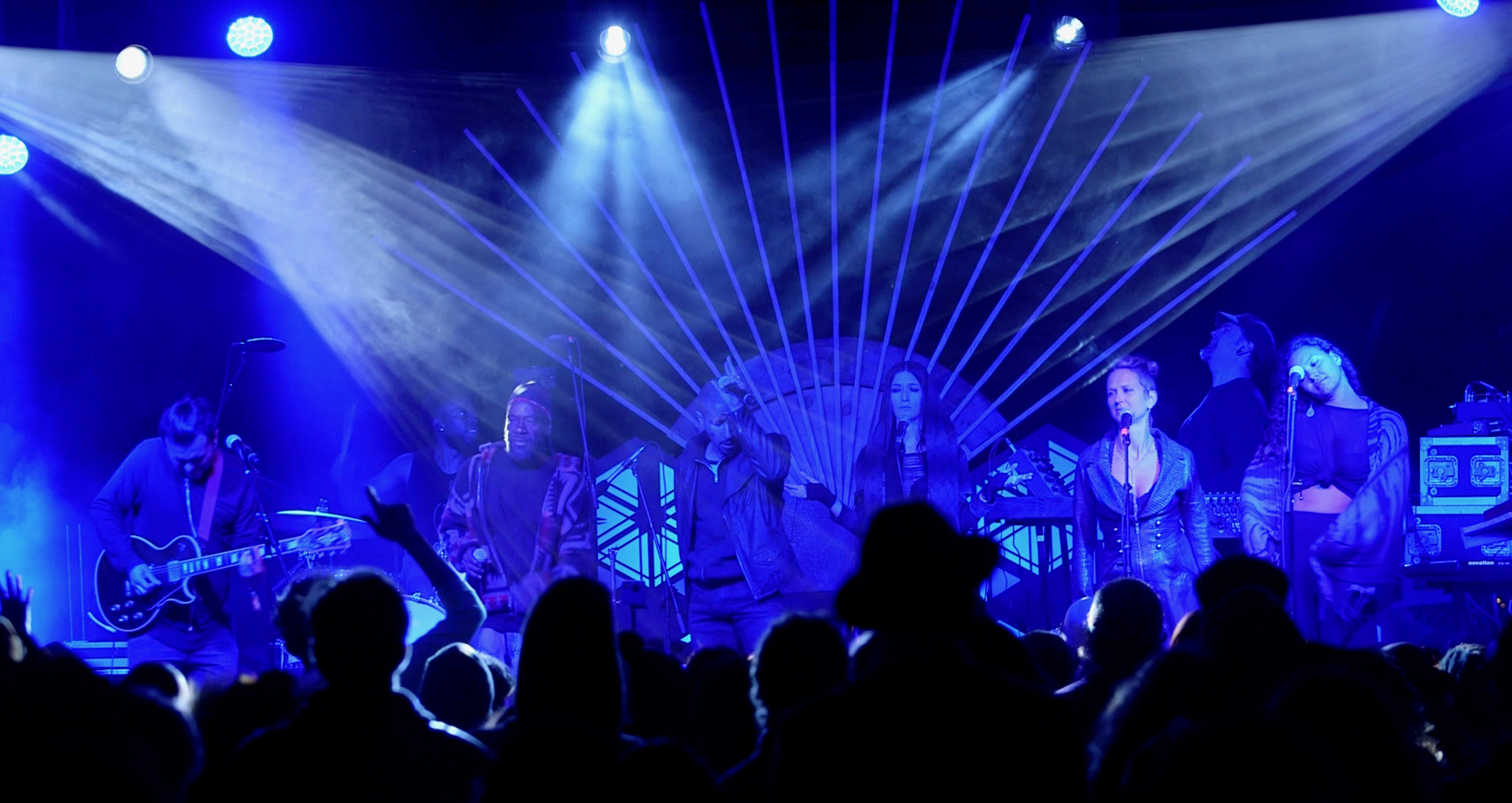
Liberation Movement performing at Lucidity Festival 2018

== Collaborators and Guest Performers ==
Liberation Movement is a collective conglomerate with a massive variety of contributors.

- Grant Chambers (Resurrector ) – production, songwriting, keyboards, live PA
- Noah King – vocals, songwriting
- Sasha Rose – vocals, keyboards, production, songwriting
- James Small – drums
- El Suchi - guitar, vocals
- Soriah - throat singing, Tuvan instruments
- Lux Moderna - production, songwriting, vocals
- Olivia Ruff - vocals
- Wailer B - vocals
- Vir McCoy - guimbri, guitar
- Oz Fritz - engineer
- Kēvens - vocals
- Brandon Farmer - live drums
- Amy Secada - dance
- Ganga Giri - didgeridoo
- Ka Amorastreyu - dance
- Bad Unkl Sista - Butoh
- Pym - production
- Skip Burton - bass
- Evan Fraser - studio musician
- MC Azeem - spoken word
- Stero-Lion - vocals
- Dr. Israel - vocals
- Moldover - Robocaster
- Liquid Stranger - production collaborator
- Hector Becerra - drums
- Inkx Herman - drums
- Kyrstyn Pixton - vocals, songwriting
- SORNE - guest vocals
- Elf Tranzporter - vocals
- Dr. Paul Roberts - voiceover
- Dakini Star - vocals
- Jillian Ann - vocals, songwriting
- Totter Todd - saxophone
- Plantrae - viola
- Stunami - live visual artist, graphic design
- Mitch Schultz - filmmaker
- Donald Schultz - filmmaker
- Shane Beresford - graphic & symbolic designer
- Shipibo Collaborators - Maestro Diogenes, Maestra Olivia, Maestro Sui, Maestro Jorge, Maestra Rosa, Maestra Maria, Maestro Antonio
- Q'ero Collaborator - Juan Gabriel

== Discography ==
- "Revelation". (2021). Live Studio Single Release. Merkaba Music
- "Condor - Remix". (2021). Resurrector/Liberation Movement release. Interchill Records
- "The Tenacious Path" (2020). Liberation Movement remix of Gala Aranaga. Independently Released
