= Resurrector =

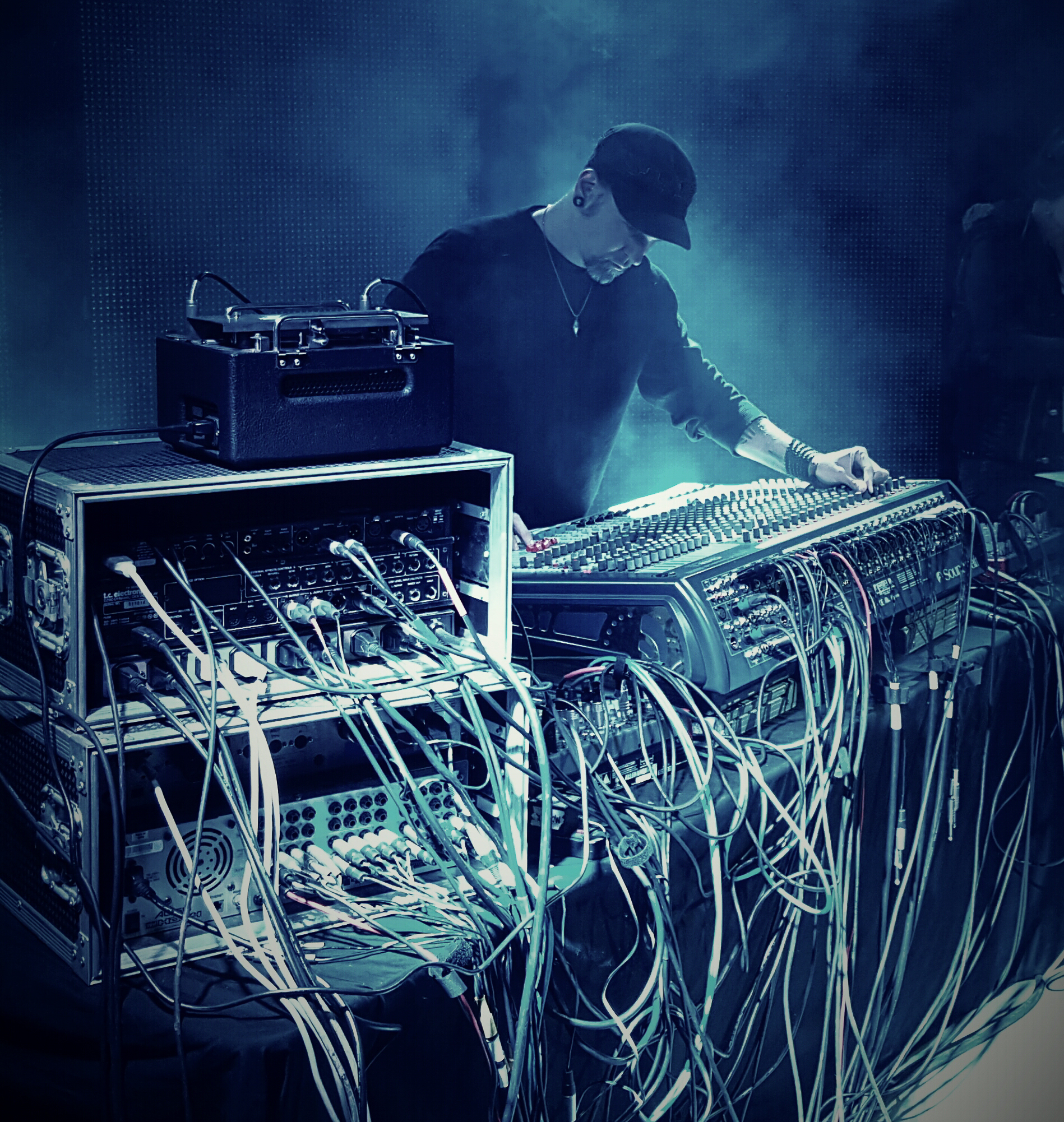
- Resurrector performing with Liberation Movement at Sonic Bloom Festival in 2015

Background information
- Also known as: Resurrector
- Born: Grant McDonald Chambers; May 10, 1971 (age 55)
- Origin: New Haven, CT, United States
- Genres: Electronica, dubtronica, reggae fusion, hip hop, trip hop
- Occupations: Producer, musician, writer
- Instruments: Synthesizer, percussion, drum machine, sampler
- Years active: 1995 – present
- Label: Champion Nation
- Website: www.championnation.net

Resurrector (born Grant McDonald Chambers, May 10, 1971 in New Haven, CT) is an electronic music producer best known as founder of Colorado/San Francisco Dub Hop band Heavyweight Dub Champion and the ethnically diverse Liberation Movement. He is the co-producer of both Heavyweight Dub Champion studio albums and is main creator of the band's philosophical ideology defined by the Last Champion Manifesto, a booklet included with the 2002 album, Survival Guide For The End of Time. Chambers now lives in San Francisco, CA and performs and produces for Heavyweight Dub Champion and Liberation Movement, among others.

== Early years ==
Chambers grew up mostly near Baltimore, MD, but lived in multiple countries where his father, a college professor, had visiting fellowships. As a teen, he promoted punk concerts and frequented the D.C. punk scene. His father, Dr. Robert H. Chambers III was president of McDaniel College from 1984–2000. In 1988, as a high school junior, he promoted a punk concert in the basement of the McDaniel College President's house. The event space was known as The Dungeon and the inaugural event was featured on the front page of the Carroll County Times. He went on to promote concerts with DC hardcore punk groups Government Issue and M.F.D. among others.

Chambers attended university at McDaniel College in Maryland, Harlaxton College in Grantham, England and received a degree in Religious Studies from University of Colorado at Boulder.

In 1995, while living in Boulder, Colorado, he founded hip hop reggae group Roots Revolt. Many of the key players in Roots Revolt would later show up on Heavyweight Dub Champion recordings, including HDC co-founder Patch Rubin.

== Heavyweight Dub Champion ==
Heavyweight Dub Champion was founded in Gold Hill, CO in 1997 and played its first show on October 31, 1997. In 2005, the band relocated to San Francisco. With Heavyweight Dub Champion, Chambers has produced two albums as Resurrector, 2002's Survival Guide For The End of Time and 2009's Rise of the Champion Nation, featuring multiple tracks with KRS-One. HDC has performed throughout the US, Canada and Europe. As described by Marquee Magazine, "The live performance is referred to as the ‘Liberation Process’ because it's intended that the music can put the audience in something like a vibratory trance and can remove layers of deception through the music." According to a review in the La Weekly, "Their genius is the great virtue of ’70s dub: never overdoing it." Another review says HDC, "sounds something like hip-hop colliding with dub inside the eye of an electronica hurricane."

=== Survival Guide For The End Of Time ===
In 2002, HDC released their debut album, Survival Guide For The End of Time- "an ill-bent mix of industrial apocalyptic hip-hop dubtronica" that "aims to topple the foundations of modern-day Babylon" as well as offering "prescriptions for survival and victory in a tension-filled time." The album was recorded and mixed in Colorado and Los Angeles and "can safely be called a concept album". As described by Resurrector, Survival Guide "relates to the coming of the Last Champion, an interdimensional spiritual warrior, who is bringing people together throughout the world to try to elevate consciousness in a way that will focus people on the healing of themselves and the healing of the world, and help put people in a more offensive position."

Survival Guide has an ambitious package including the band's credo, Last Champion Manifesto, a 70-page booklet "detailing their mission of 'Unconditional Liberation of the Human Race,'” a poster by Jher 451 and sticker of their "protector" logo. As described by Denver's Westword Magazine, "Structurally, the record moves from the announcement of the battle to the rallying calls of the Last Champion's chosen army – followers who unite to liberate individuals and the Earth – to the eventual announcement of the Last Champion as a victor in the championship against predators who have put a stranglehold on humanity's innate desire to creatively seek truth, beauty, pleasure and power."

Our intention is to use music and vibration as catalysts for creation of a new culture, which ultimately, in the quantum universe, can be the focal point for the creation of a new reality

— Resurrector

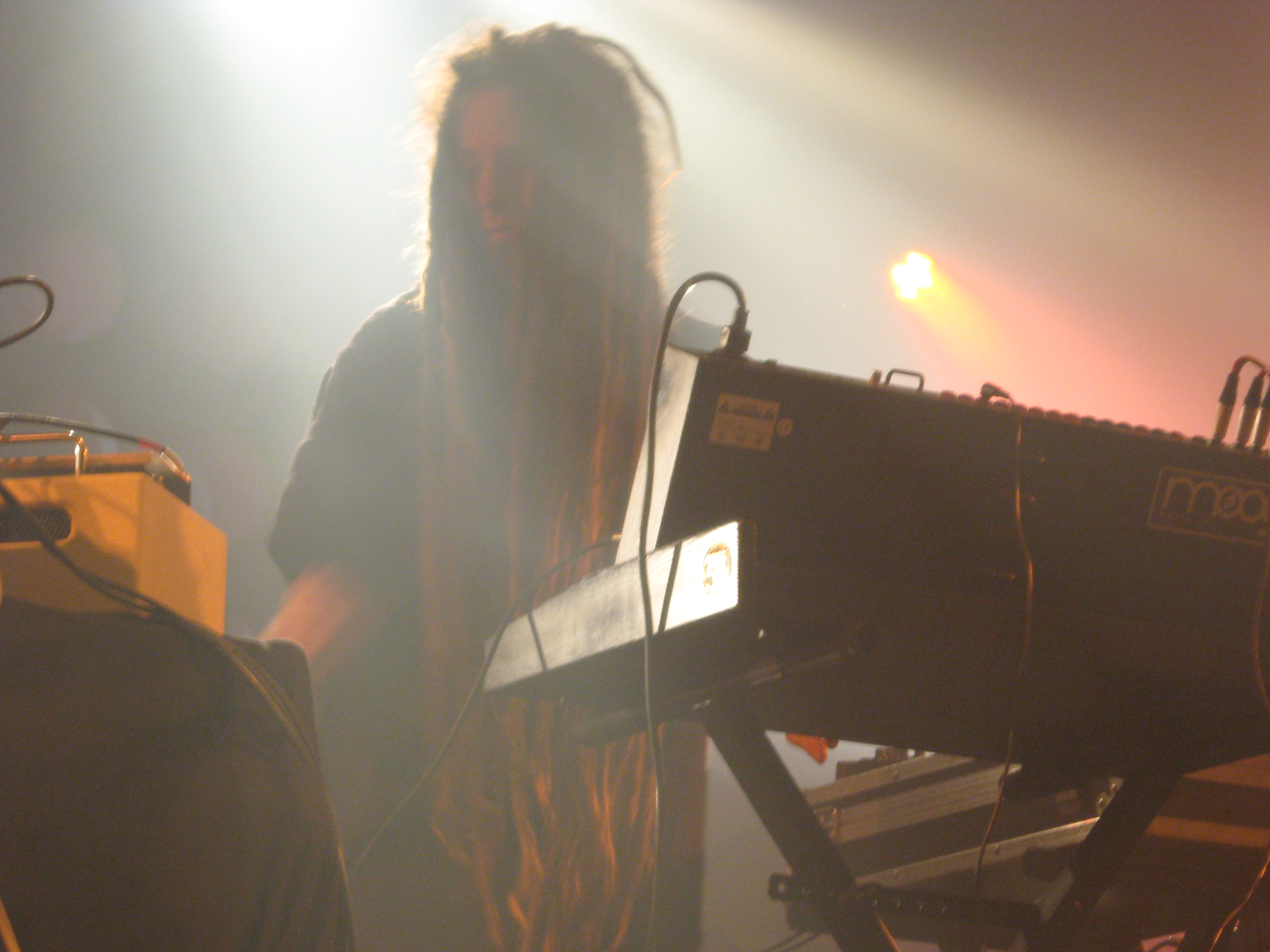
Resurrector performing with Heavyweight Dub Champion at Eurockeennes Festival in France, 2007

=== Last Champion Manifesto ===
"Penned just hours after the arrival of the new millennium", the Last Champion Manifesto and included in Survival Guide is a 70-page document "steeped in allegory and at times reading like ancient scripture", according to The Source Weekly. The LA Weekly calls it a "bible/babble manifesto" and the Denver Westword refers to it as a "scripturally spirited rant." The Westword reports that, at an early age, Chambers received visions from the "Last Champion" during periods of "severe headaches and lengthy vomiting sessions." The Last Champion Manifesto serves as the ideological foundation of both the album Survival Guide for the End of Time and the band Heavyweight Dub Champion as a whole- "We're a concept band. Everything we do is related to the manifesto. Every album will be that way," says Chambers.

There are seven chapters broken into mini-chapters named after the songs on Survival Guide and 2008's Rise of the Champion Nation. Each album serves as a sort of soundtrack to elements presented in the booklet. Songs relate to actions such as the Arrival, which was remixed by San Francisco's award-winning favorite Bassnectar, "Liberation Process", "Exorcism" and so on. Most of the themes relate to becoming a Warrior and the development of the "Last Champion's Chosen Army" known as "Champion Nation", which is also the name of the record label founded by Chambers.

=== Rise Of The Champion Nation ===
Heavyweight Dub Champion's follow up album (a "limited edition" was released at shows in Fall of 2008) includes guest appearances and endorsements from KRS-One, who states in the title track, "Heavyweight Dub Champion restores all hope", Killah Priest and Brooklyn Dub pioneer Dr. Israel, in addition to the familiar cast of A.P.O.S.T.L.E. and others. The project was mixed by Bill Laswell's veteran engineer Oz Fritz and is mastered by industry favorite Brian Gardner. Rise is described by one reviewer as "a rock-opera (or hip-hop opera) of sorts – a concept album of the highest sorts – and almost cinematic in its mostly dark themes and structure."

The album is conceptual following "the Warrior" from the Arrival, through Warrior Divination One, Two and Three, to emerge as King Of The Mountain and the eventual journey ends with Promised Land. Throughout the album the character of Emcee Vill is again beckoned to by "N.A.F. Agents" while on his quest to infiltrate Champion Nation and assassinate the Last Champion. Pop Matters describes the album as using "socially conscience and spiritual weapons of words to tell a story whose central plot leads to a philosophical and spiritual revival and a genuine awakening of the human spirit... (with) an apocalyptic and epic cinematic soundtrack."

Reviewed by Derek Beres in the Huffington Post, he calls the album "A conversion, the ending of an era, a new dawn". He goes on, "Their hope might feel bitter to the taste, but only because they are correctly reflecting reality. By the glean of their astute and painstaking cultural observations, we are invited to join into their dance. It may require we pound our fists and wave our heads—their trance is fitful, not wistful... this band does achieve greatness." Music Connection Magazine describes the album as "A consortium of prophets heralding our doomed planet."

== Liberation Movement ==
Reality Sandwich calls Liberation Movement "a new collaborative music project that pushes the boundaries of human experience". Liberation Movement was developed out of experiences Chambers had working with the Shipibo Tribe in Peru. It was formed in 2010 in San Francisco. Chambers explains in an interview, "The project was seeded at the Temple of the Way of Light in the Peruvian Amazon, at which point I was recruited to work with and create recordings of shamans in traditional ceremonies in Peru. From that foundation, I wanted to start gathering artists and musicians that represent "archetypal gateways"; veterans in different musical fields whose goal is to connect with the deepest life journey." He says he chose the name because "speaking the name is a revolutionary potential in and of itself.

Resurrector explains his work in Liberation Movement:

The focus of what we’re doing is creating culture as a form of vibrational medicine. It’s not just about music, it’s a way of life and collaborators are participating in the creation of this new culture... Liberation Movement is ultimately a gathering of gatekeeper archetypes, coming together to usher in a new form of liberation technology through music and vibration.

=== Work with the Shipibo Tribe of the Peruvian Amazon ===
In 2010, Chambers "went to Peru to learn about how music and vibration are connected to shamanism". This led to him recording more than 25 indigenous singers from the Shipibo Tribe at the Temple Of The Way Of Light near Iquitos, Peru and produce and release the album Onáyabaon Bewá – Messages from Mother Earth by Shamans of the Temple of the Way of Light.

In 2014, in collaboration with Peruvian-based NGO Alianza Arkana and the Rubin Foundation, he led Liberation Movement to Peru with bandmates Sasha Rose, Noah King and filmmakers Mitch Schultz (Writer/Director of DMT: The Spirit Molecule), Donald Schultz and Jason Gamble Harter to document a concert and surrounding journeys to villages along the Amazon River. Mitch Schultz stated, "Cross-cultural interfaces are paramount for accessing indigenous knowledge through a modern lens, or in this case the musical experience of Liberation Movement."

=== "Jiwexon Axebo" Concert ===
On May 2, 2014, Liberation Movement collaborated on a concert with Peruvian-based NGO Alianza Arkana called "Jiwexon Axebo" in the Shipibo Tribe's language and "Cultural Revival" in English. They "performed to 600 indigenous Peruvians"in the town square of Yarinacocha in Pucallpa, Peru and had two indigenous shamans perform with them. Also performing at the concert was a local Cumbia orchestra called Sensacìon Shipibo. The event was described as "a progressive leap forward, bringing together cultures in a productive and creative light and working together for a common purpose- the preservation of the rainforest, its people and traditions."

=== Olivia Arévalo Lomas ===
Often heralded as the leader and "spiritual mother" of the indigenous Shipibo-konibo community, Maestra Olivia Arévalo Lomas who both performed and recorded with Liberation Movement was tragically murdered in April 2018 at her home. She is featured on the Resurrector produced album Onáyabaon Bewá – Messages from Mother Earth.

=== Live performance ===
Liberation Movement has received many accolades for its live performances and they have performed at festivals throughout the Americas including Lightning in a Bottle, Symbiosis Gathering, Sonic Bloom, Joshua Tree Music Festival, Envision in Costa Rica, Atmosphere Gathering in Canada and many others. A review by Everest.com of their performance at the Oregon Eclipse Festival in 2017 stated that Liberation Movement, "shone brightest among the Earth Stage's magnificent programming... Resurrector himself, Grant Chambers, provided a veritable séance in deep dubby beat-science... This was a spiritualized journey that burrowed many thousands of leagues beneath the Earth's surface, penetrating the consciousness of all who had assembled." Liberation Movement live performances often feature a wide variety of collaborators and guests from varied genres including Peruvian shamans, champion Tuvan throat singer Soriah, Butoh dance troupe Bad Unkl Sista, SORNE and many others.

== Ideology ==
Resurrector focuses on ideological perspectives in many of his interviews on behalf of his projects. He often speaks about music being Sonic Shamanistic Alchemy and the members of Heavyweight Dub Champion are often referred to as Sonic Shamanistic Alchemists. He defines the process as, "basically taking a range of vibrational materials, from tribal instruments to electronic instruments, and manipulating them through devices like tape delays and old analog stomp boxes to try to find the personality of each piece... looking for particular voices, particular vibrations that would contribute to the spectrum of sound we're trying to bring forth, a spectrum of liberational revolutionary energy. Whatever we do with a sound, we have a specific mission: to change the chemistry of the planet leading to unconditional liberation of the human race."

A defining quotation written by Resurrector that is often used to represent his projects is "the liberation process is in full effect". He describes the process in an interview with Reality Sandwich about Liberation Movement:

Our intention is to use music and vibration as catalysts for creation of a new culture, which ultimately, in the quantum universe, can be the focal point for the creation of a new reality– and I believe music is the best way to do this. Our vision is that, when in that space, people are free from manipulation, generating a field of strength for people to look inside themselves for their own keys and paths to their journey towards liberation. We reflect this in our art, through symbols that represent gateways for reaching and achieving this state.

== Discography ==
=== with Roots Revolt ===
- His Foundation is in the Holy Mountains (1996). Live Blend

=== with Heavyweight Dub Champion ===
- "Whirlwinds of Revolt" – Voodoo, Sacraments, Oddities and Other Holy Anthems. (1998). Reggae on the Rocks Compilation. What Are Records?
- Survival Guide for the End of Time. (2002). Champion Nation Recordings
- "Arrival" – Bassnectar Remix (2006 & 2008). Bassnectar. Om Records & Organic Records
- "Snared" – Freq Nasty vs. Heavyweight Dub Champion. (2008). Give Back Compilation
- Rise of the Champion Nation – Limited Edition. (2008). Champion Nation Recordings
- "Rise" – Liquid Stranger and Heavyweight Dub Champion".(2011).Interchill
- "Babylon Beast" – Liquid Stranger and Heavyweight Dub Champion. (2011). Interchill
- "Babylon Beast(feat. Killah Priest)" – In Defense: A Benefit for the Civil Liberties Defense Center, Vol. 1. Compilation. (2010). Autonomous Music
- Labyrinth in Dub – EP Kraddy & Heavyweight Dub Champion. (2013). Minotaur
- "Praise The Father" – The Bloom Series Vol. 3: Ways of the Sacred Pt.2. 2013. Muti Music

=== with Liberation Movement ===
- "Revelation". (2021). Live Studio Single Release. Merkaba Music
- "Condor - Remix". (2021). Resurrector/Liberation Movement release. Interchill Records
- "The Tenacious Path" (2020). Liberation Movement remix of Gala Aranaga. Independently Released

=== As producer ===
- "Onáyabaon Bewá – Messages from Mother Earth". (2011). Shamans of the Temple of the Way of Light.
