= Soriah =

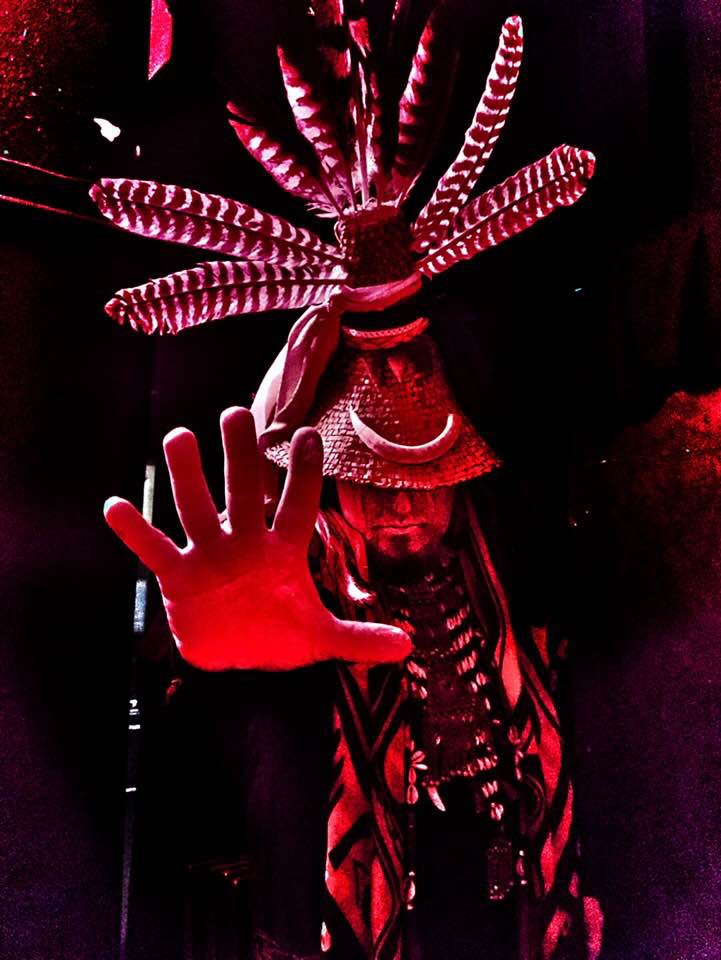

Background information
- Also known as: Uger Khan
- Born: Enrique Ugalde; April 1, 1971 (age 55); San Bernardino, California, U.S.
- Genres: Experimental; world; folk; overtone singing; ambient; noise; sganabuc
- Occupations: Singer, musician, performance artist
- Instruments: Vocals, guitar, organ, igil, doshpuluur, byzaanchy, shoor, doumbek, kengergee
- Years active: 1999–present
- Labels: Projekt, Beta-lactam Ring Records, Ruido Horrible
- Website: soriahmusic.com

Soriah (born Enrique Ugalde; April 1, 1971) is an American overtone singer, performance artist, multi-instrumentalist, and shamanic ritualist headquartered in Portland, Oregon and the Tuvan Republic. His music is a synthesis of traditional forms such as Tuvan throat singing, Shamanic music, Raga, and pre-Columbian Mexica music and language; with avant garde musical styles like Industrial, Ambient, Noise, and Goth. Likewise, his live performance is a fusion of costume and ritual from Tuva, Mexico, North American Native cultures, and Western Ceremonial Magic traditions; as well as chaos magic, butoh, and modern primitive movements of the 20th century. His lyrics, when there are any, are often written in the Nahuatl or traditional Tuvan languages. He won the title of "Best Foreigner" at the 2008 Ustuu-Khuree Festival in Chadanaa Tuva, and in that same year placed as "Third Laureate" at The International Throat Singing Symposium, which remains the highest award given to a non-Tuvan in the history of the Symposium. He also won 2nd Place in the Tuvan Nation Kargyraa Competition in 2014, was given a special award as "Great innovator of the art of Tuvan Throat Singing" in 2016, and won Best Kargyraa Performance at the Khoomei in the Center of Asia Festival 2019. As a solo artist, and with various collaborators and musical ensembles, Soriah has toured throughout the United States, Europe, Asia, and Mexico. He is considered the highest-ranked non-native practitioner of Tuvan throat singing.

== Early life and career ==
Enrique Ugalde was born in San Bernardino, California and moved to Oakland at a young age. His father was the drummer for a popular rock and roll band in Mexico called Los Sputniks. As a child, he was exposed to traditional Mesoamerican cultures on frequent family trips to Mexico City with his father, and by his Mexican grandmother. He describes himself as having sung and played guitar in a church choir as a child, begun his study of opera and other Western classical singing shortly thereafter, and being inducted into the State of California Honors Chorus in his high school years. His interest in the "goth" subculture led him to music like Bauhaus, Einsturzende Neubauten, Crash Worship, and Psychic TV; which influenced his shift from classical music to a more experimental and industrial direction. He studied vocal performance at California State University, Long Beach in 1990 before moving first to Berkeley, then to Oakland. It was in Oakland that he made his first recordings of looped vocals and ambient electronics, which he regards as the roots of the Soriah project. He first invented the name Soriah in early 1995 for the title of a song, "The Course of Soriah." This is the name he gave to his "timeless essence outside the body." In Oakland, he performed with various industrial and experimental music projects, and was known for hosting illegal "Trespass Parties" in abandoned factories and shipyards.

Ugalde relocated to Portland, Oregon in 1996. There he met and studied the Kirana style of raga with famed instructor Michael Stirling, and encountered throat singing for the first time in recordings and a subsequent live show by Huun Huur Tu. He provided percussion, guitar, and vocals for numerous music and performance projects during the late 90s in Portland included Sumerland, Big Milk Bath, Black Orchid, Feral, PANDrogynous Ad Nauseum, Flail, Mesmer; and the collective known alternately as 2Gyrlz and Pan/Zen.

== Early Soriah years ==
The first public Soriah performances took place in 1999 in Portland, and he quickly achieved renown in the underground arts and music scene. He describes his circle of friends and artists at that time as "neo-tribal." In addition to nightclubs and theaters, early Soriah performances often took place in unconventional locations; such as the underground "shanghai tunnels" of Portland's Oldtown neighborhood, the ruins of the Sutro Baths in San Francisco, in the midst of a citywide protest against George W. Bush in 2005, buried up to his waist in the earth, and half-submerged in a swamp full of frogs on the campus of Reed College. His costumes vary; but often include white make-up or clay accentuated with black lines and fields of color on the face, large headdresses and wide-brimmed hats, ritual robes, and white tulle that obscures facial and bodily features.

During this period, he played with an alternating ensemble of drummers, percussionists, electronic musicians, and dancers including Lana Guerra (aka Power Circus), Stephen Schieberl (aka Let's Go Outside, aka LGO, aka Demogorgon), Ryan Olson, Noah Mickens, Jonathan Howitt, Daniel Henderson, Marshall Serna, Ashkelon Sain, Lucretia Renee, Barrett Clark (aka Sidereal Oscillations), and many others.

== Recordings ==
Soriah's solo show at The Old Church in Portland featured Soriah accompanying his own vocals on a 20-foot-tall antique pipe organ, and was captured for his first CD release Chao Organica in A Minor (2006, Beta-Lactam Ring Records.) His 2007 follow up release on BLR, Offrendas de Luz a los Muertos, is an extended duet with Lana Guerra playing homemade analog synthesizers that he describes as being his most discordant and intense recording, and also as a "sonic exorcism." A recording from Soriah's 2007 appearance on Bay Area radio station KFJC was released as Marakame on Mexican label Ruido Horrible the following year.

In 2009, Soriah signed to Projekt Records and co-produced an album called Atlan with Ashkelon Sain of Trance to the Sun, assembling a group of musicians who would form the core of his live ensemble for the next several years (Jonathan Howitt, Daniel Henderson, and Marshall Serna.) He describes this as a return to his roots in both classical and gothic music, after the previous two noise-industrial oriented releases. This ensemble has toured extensively, eventually releasing a second Soriah/Sain album called Eztica in 2011.

A number of Soriah recordings have been self-released in digital form since then; including Asterism with Barrett Clark (aka Sidereal Oscillations), Wonderful Disease – The Best of Soriah and LGO, and several others.

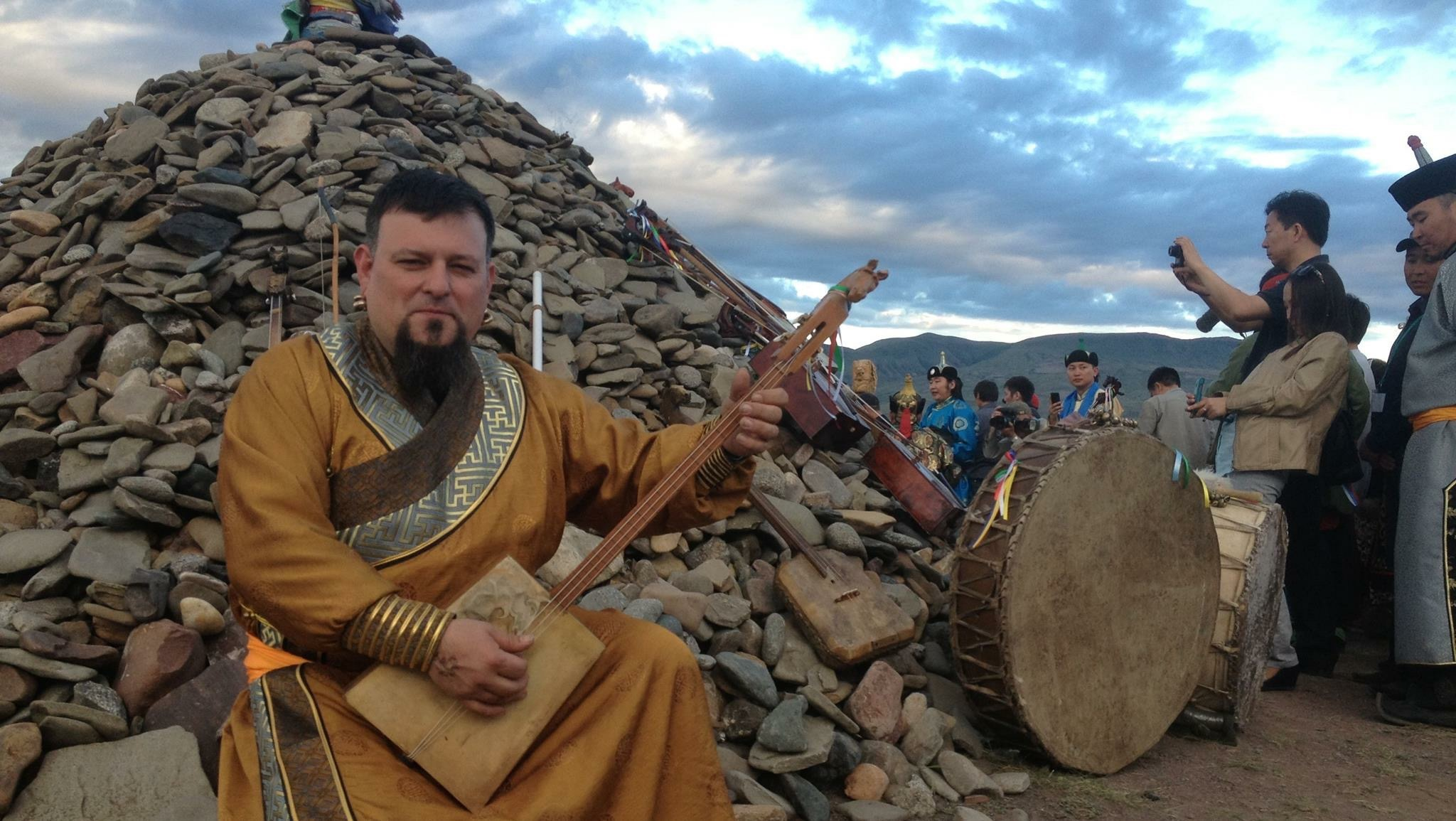
Soriah at Khöömei Ovaa, Aldan Bylak, Tuva

== Tuva and Uger Khan ==
Ugalde first trained with Tuvan masters Chirgilchin at an intensive camp in Sebastapol, California in 2005. They invited him to attend the first International Throat Singing Camp in Tuva in 2007; and he returned in 2008 to participate in the Ustuu-Khuree Festival, where he was awarded the title of "Best Foreigner." He is the only non-Tuvan to have ever placed in the overall competition.

From that point onward, he would split his time as much as possible between Tuva and the US. He has appeared on Tuvan television, taught at a youth music school in the city of Kyzyl, and performed traditional music throughout the country. Aldar Tamdyn, the Tuvan Minister of Culture, granted him the name "Uger Khan," which translates roughly as "Milky Way King." He released an album of traditional Tuvan music under this name in 2013 on Khai-Aat Music, called "Tergiinner Yryzy" or "Songs of the Masters." Since then, he uses Uger Khan to denote his strictly traditional concerts and recordings; and Soriah for his more experimental world fusion music.

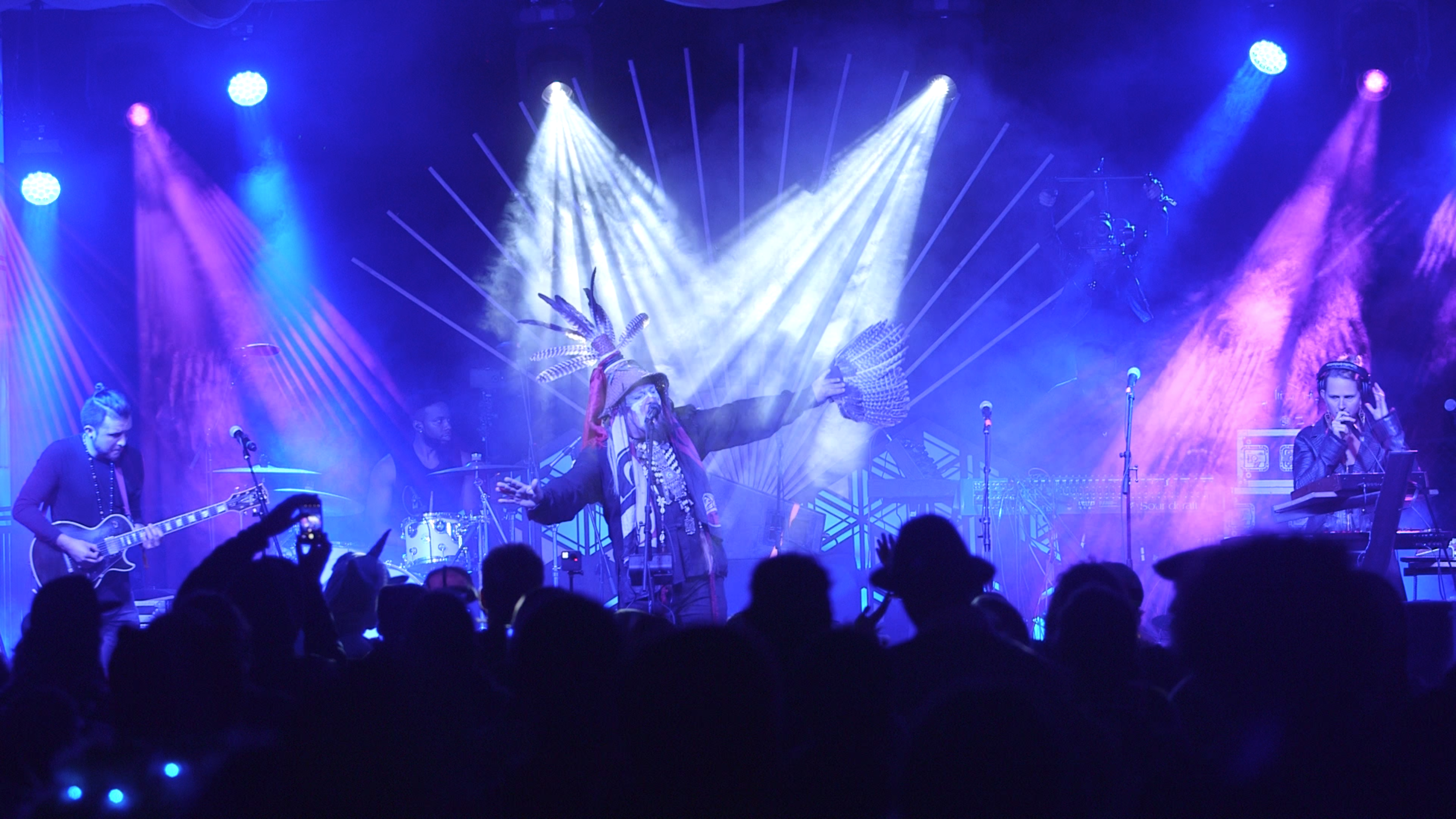
Soriah performing with Liberation Movement at Lucidity Festival 2018

== Festival appearances ==
Soriah has had a presence on the West Coast festival scene for many years and in many forms, including many appearances with the project Liberation Movement. Soriah has performed at The Autonomous Mutant Festival, Burning Man, How to Destroy the Universe, Wave Gotik Treffen in Leipzig Germany 2013, Oregon Eclipse Gathering 2017, and The Symbiosis Gathering.

== Collaborations ==
Throughout his career, Soriah has maintained a close relationship with the radical arts non-profit 2Gyrlz and the related Pan-Zen Konspiracy Nett-Wyrk. He performed in the 2Gyrlz-produced EnterActive Language Festival in every year of its existence from 2002 to 2005, and in their How to Destroy the Universe event in 2006; and dozens of other shows. Their collaboration has continued with shows in the United Kingdom in 2010, 2011, and 2013.

In addition to those mentioned previously in this article, Soriah has performed or recorded with: Peter Murphy, Liberation Movement, SORNE, Bad Unkl Sista; David J, Dead Voices on Air, Lustmord, Thor & Friends; King Black Acid; Chirgilchin, Societas Insomnia, Bogville, Synchronicity Frequency; cEvin Key, Modest Mouse, The Dandy Warhols, Nachyn and Shonchalai Choduu; Terry Riley, Sleepytime Gorilla Museum, Perry Farrell, Mesmer, Mandible Chatter, Akira Kasai, Blixa Bargeld, The Living Jarboe, Psychic TV, Scott Kelly, F-Space, Chrome, Waldteufel, Gwar, Extra Action Marching Band, The Polyphonic Spree, MarchFourth Marching Band, Trance to the Sun, Huun Huur Tu, Chirgilchin, Alash, Yat-Kha, Download, The Dresden Dolls, Everyone Orchestra, P.A.N., Submarine Fleet, ¡Tchkung!, To-Ka-Ge, Sardonik Grin, Death Posture, Children of Paradise, Michael Sakamoto, Yakuza, Riververb, Hop-Frog, Legerdemain, The Moe!kestra!, Degenerate Art Ensemble, Serpentine, The Red King, CoRE, Aixela, Venerable Showers of Beauty Gamelan, and Hippie Death Cult.

He also appeared on a single episode of America's Got Talent Season 5, in 2010, and was eliminated in the first round.

== Personal life ==
Enrique Ugalde has a son in Tuva, also named Enrique Ugalde, with a woman named Jamilya Oorzhak. He is a well-known public figure in Portland; where he has often won karaoke contests and awards for Most Popular Cab Driver. He drives for worker-owned local company Radio Cab. He sings and plays guitar in a David Bowie cover band called Blackstar Rising and played bass in a Cure cover band called theXplodingboys for 9 months in 2009. He occasionally performs as pirate character Captain Bootybeard.

== Discography ==
Albums

- Chao Organica in A Minor (Beta-Lactam Ring Records, 2006)
- Ofrendas de Luz a los Muertos (Beta-Lactam Ring Records, 2007)
- Marakame (Ruido Horrible, 2008)
- Atlan (with Ashkelon Sain) (Projekt Records, 2009)
- Eztica (with Ashkelon Sain) (Projekt Records, 2011)
- Gnostic (self-released, 2018)
- Cathartes (self-released, 2021)

Compilations

- Wonderful Disease – The Best of Soriah and LGO (self-released 2018)

Live Albums

- Eztica Tour Collection (self-released, 2012)
- Live at The Fez – Vernal Equinox (with Marian Star) (self-released, 2015)
- Iluminacíon Del Escarabajo (self-released, 2017)
- Charon (self-released, 2017)
- Katabatik 2009 (with Sidereal Oscillations) (self-released, 2017)
- Abduction (self-released, 2018)
- Asterism (with Sidereal Oscillations) (self-released, 2018)
- A Dream Beyond Zarqa (self-released, 2018)

Guest appearances

- Mandible Chatter: Of Foreign Lands and People, "A Sun to Lift Sleep From the Weary" and "Man Bites Spoon" (Relapse Records, 2003)
- Dead Voices On Air: Michael and the Angels Fought, "Moon" (Lens Records, 2011)
- The Dandy Warhols: This Machine, "SETI vs The Wow! Signal" (The End Records, 2012)
- Lustmord: The Word as Power, "Grigori" (Blackest Ever Black, 2013)
- Armchair Migraine Journey: Blood Coupling Magnet, "Rebirth Blood ΩM" (Beta-Lactam Ring Records, 2015)
- Thor & Friends: The Subversive Nature of Kindness (LM Dupli-cation, 2017)

Compilation appearances

- "Exit", How to Destroy the Universe Part 5 (Mobilization Records, 2006)
- "Star Send-Off", West Coast Post-Asiatic (URCK Records, 2006)
- "Guerilla Live In St. Augustine Fl", "Pt. 3", and "Teotizque?", Power Circus: Swank Harder Phoenix (self-released, date unknown)
- "Tehuan", Post-Asiatic: Lost War Dream Music (URCK Records, 2007)
- "Untitled", Fall Into Darkness 2009 (Fell Studios, 2010)
- "XIUHCOATL", Live From the Devil's Triangle 13 (KFJC, 2010)
- "Tonacayotica (Remix)", Under the Weight of Light (Projekt Records, 2010)
- "Chylandyk", The Lovecraft Bar Compilation Vol. 1 (Lovecraft Bar self-released, 2012)
- "Chylandyk" and "Xiuhcoatl", XiX (Projekt Records, 2013)
- "Recuerdos de Luna", Possibilities of Circumstance (Projekt Records, 2013)
- "Ehecatl", No Dead Seas: No Red Seas Vol 2 (no label)
- "Amo Cahuit", Victor Frankenstein (Music for a Dark Evening) (Projekt Records, 2015)

Mixes

- "Star Send-Off", Leekid: Fugue (Bruits de Fond, 2012)
- "Star Send-Off", DJ Psyko-Pal: Restructuration Industrielle (Bruits de Fond, 2015)
