= Robin Jackson (musician) =

American multi-instrumentalist and singer-songwriter

- Born: July 8, 1979 (age 47)
- Origin: Portland, Oregon, U.S.
- Genre: Indie folk
- Instruments: Saxophone, clarinet, voice, guitar, mbira, whistles, various other instruments
- Website: https://robinjackson.net/

Robin Jackson (born July 8, 1979) is an American multi-instrumentalist, composer, and singer-songwriter. His main instruments are saxophone, clarinet, and voice. He also plays guitar, mbira, whistles, and various other instruments.

Jackson is known for his eclectic songwriting, showmanship, and also his involvement in community organizing. His solo music is often likened to the indie folk category and has been compared to Andrew Bird, Sufjan Stevens, and Rufus Wainwright.

== Early Musical Life (1984–2005) ==
Jackson was trained in the Suzuki method from the age of four and played with numerous bands throughout high school and college. He attended the University of Oregon, Christchurch Jazz Polytechnic and graduated with a BA in Ethnomusicology from the Evergreen College in 2003. During this time Jackson immersed himself in the study of Balkan music from Eastern Europe as well as music from Africa and Brazil.

Jackson lived in New Zealand on and off from 1993 to 2005. While there, he studied Jazz at the New Zealand Polytechnic and was influenced by Dub music. While attending the school, he met members of Fat Freddy's Drop and Phoenix Foundation and played with them in 2004–2005.

== Career ==
In 2003, Jackson was a founding member of the bands Marchfourth! And Vagabond Opera, where he performed regularly on NPR.

In 2006, Jackson won third place in the International Songwriting Competition with the song "Space Hole" produced by Marchfourth. He recorded on the first three of the band's albums and toured with the band to Germany where they headlined at the 2004 World Cup. He also toured with Vagabond Opera and recorded on all 4 of their albums and performed at the Kennedy Center, DC and throughout Europe.

Jackson released his debut solo album "Dust Diaries" in 2012 with Producer Chet Lyster, who played with Grammy winner Lucinda Williams. He is currently the musical director for the band The EELS. After the release of Dust Diaries, the song "Roses and Gold" from the album went viral in China reaching over 60 million streams on sites such as Netease in 2015.

Jackson released his second album "Dark Stars" in 2017 and recorded it at Type Foundry Studios. Both of Jackson's solo albums feature members of The Portland Cello Project, Marchfourth, The Eels, Vagabond Opera, Utopia, and Nahko and Medicine for the People.

In addition to fronting his own band, Jackson has recorded, performed, and toured with other acts including Emancipator, Beats Antique, Rising Appalachia, Devotchka, Gogol Bordello, The Everyone Orchestra, Ayla Nereo, Pink Martini and the Polish Ambassador, where he performed at the Red Rocks Amphitheater in 2019.

== Community Involvement ==
A community figure and organizer, Jackson is the founder of the Songwriter Soiree and the NW Songwriter Soiree Retreat. These events have hosted guests including The Shook Twins, Storm Large, David Jacobs-Strain, Three Leg Torso, and Luz Mendoza (of Y La Bamba).

Inspired by his own experience with bands in High School and with Marchfourth, he also co-founded a non-profit circus arts and music program for kids called the Joy Now Arts Project, based in Portland.

== Discography ==
- Dust Diaries (2012)
- Dark Stars (2017)
