= Noah Mickens =

- Also known as: William Batty
- Origin: Portland, Oregon, United States
- Genres: bohemian, burlesque, butoh, cabaret, circus, emcee, performance art, punk, swing, vaudeville
- Years active: 1992–present
- Labels: unsigned

Noah Howard Mickens (born February 18) is an American performance artist, showman, and writer from Portland, Oregon, primarily known for his contributions to vaudevillian revival, and as a ringmaster and master of Ceremonies for several theatrical circus troupes. His stage persona, William Batty currently serves as the ringmaster of the Wanderlust Circus, as well as the emcee of numerous vaudevillian and bohemian events in the area.

Mickens has worked in a variety of performance media: scrap-metal percussion, singing, butoh, drama, circus arts, rock opera, and fashion modeling. Several of his collaborative projects have been combinations of two or more of the aforementioned art forms. Mickens has also performed as composer, director, and producer of numerous theatrical productions, as well as show promoter and publicist for various venues in the Portland area, including Someday Lounge, Dante's, The Jasmine Tree, and the Rotture-Branx venue complex.

== Early life ==
Mickens has described growing up in Los Angeles with his mother and his brother, Sam Mickens (a vocalist, guitarist, and composer for such bands as The Dead Science, Xiu Xiu, and Parenthetical Girls). In an interview with Portland Monthly, he said he was taught to juggle at age 14 by a homeless man named Robert. "I began to meet other people who were into that sort of thing," he recalls, "and I started to think of myself as a circus performer."

Mickens began singing in local punk and pop bands in Los Angeles, among them Poor Old Timer, which he described as "blues-inflected punk music".

In 1996, Mickens moved to Portland, OR, and quickly became involved in a variety of theatrical and musical endeavors, including Nequaquam Vacuum (Latin for "the void does not exist"), an improvisational "post-asiatic chamber noise" ensemble, which he formed in 1999 with Tyler Armstrong and Travis McAlister. In 2004, Oregon Public Broadcasting filmed a short documentary on Mickens and Nequaquam Vacuum for the station's Oregon Art Beat program. The program showed Mickens, Armstrong and McAlister performing alongside butoh dancers from the PAN Butoh troupe.

Mickens began organizing avant-garde performances through underground networks of artists. One such network was 36 Invisibles, which Mickens founded in 2000. Under the name 36 Invisibles, Mickens arranged and promoted performances by a variety of artists, usually at the Jasmine Tree, a small tiki bar near the Portland State University campus. He was also heavily involved with the Radon collective, another loose affiliation of avant-garde artists for which he was considered the "Portland Liaison ". From roughly 2001 to the present day he has recorded and toured with Stooges saxophonist Steve Mackay and the Radon Ensemble, composed of Radon members from around the world. In 2001, he also began collaborating with 2 Gyrlz Performative Arts, a Portland-based performance group founded by Lisa Newman and Llewyn Maire, and served on its board of directors. 2Gyrlz produced an annual month-long event, the EnterActive Language Festival, a multifaceted performance art showcase. His band Nequaquam Vacuum is listed in the 2Gyrlz archives as an EnterActive participant as early as 2002, as well as 36 Invisibles, and the PAN Butoh troupe, with which he was also involved.

== Early circuses and booking: 2004–2007 ==
In 2004 Mickens performed as ringmaster in Cicuri Curajul, his first foray into organizing a circus. Cicuri Curajul, a "fake Romanian circus", performed at the Crystal Ballroom April 25, 2004. In the same year he began organizing another project, a ritual performance troupe called "Societas Insomnia" (Latin for "Nightmare Company"). Societas Insomnia told, in several installments between 2004 and 2007, a story of otherworldly creatures within a living nightmare, combining "ritual performance" (including fire performance, hook suspension, and butoh) with circus arts and live music. This collaborative project also featured vocal performances by Portland-based tuvan throat singer Enrique Ugalde, with whom Mickens has frequently collaborated, providing musical backing for Ugalde's solo project Soriah. In Societas Insomnia, Ugalde played the role of The Sun.

In 2005 Mickens toured with a newly formed underground freak show, then called the 999 Eyes ov Endless Dream Carnival and Sideshow of the Damned (now simply known as the 999 Eyes Freakshow), for which he performed as ringmaster and master of ceremonies.

After traveling by bus with The 999 Eyes Freakshow on its first tour in 2005, Mickens moved to Seattle to further pursue his study of butoh. He played music, danced, and acted in a great number of shows during his relatively brief stay in Seattle: Die Wandlung with Implied Violence, The Greasy Demon Heat Cycle with The Villainaires Academy, and numerous butoh and musical collaborations with PAN, Death Posture, his brother Sam Mickens, and others.

In April 2006 Mickens was hired by Someday Lounge, a performance-art oriented nightclub in downtown Portland started by Kris and Eric Robison, two brothers who owned the adjacent Backspace Cafe and were interested in hosting the EnterActive Language Festival and other "experimental, progressive performance art". He left Seattle and became creative director and booker at Someday, and frequently performed and acted as emcee for events there. In February 2007, the Portland Mercury reported that Mickens had been suddenly fired from Someday Lounge

Mickens worked as an independent producer, director, and actor in numerous productions, including the opera Queen of Knives composed by Eric Stern, the dark fairytale operetta series Bogville co-directed with Tiare Tashnick (aka NagaSita), an outdoor butoh production of A Midsummer Night's Dream co-directed with Mizu Desierto; and his main project, Wanderlust Circus, co-directed and -produced with Nick "The Creature" Harbar.

== Wanderlust Circus: 2006–present ==
In 2006, during his time at Someday Lounge, Mickens threw his efforts into performing with another vaudevillian project. Originally called Batty's Hippodrome, the show was a revue of circus arts, featuring a variety of performances, with Mickens playing a character named William Batty, loosely based on the Victorian England circus proprietor of the same name, who created Batty's Hippodrome in Kensington Gardens. Mickens performed as a slightly menacing Batty in bright suits and heavy stage makeup, leading press to make comparisons to The Joker. Early in the history of Batty's Hippodrome, Mickens began collaborating with Nick "The Creature" Harbar, who had recently wrapped production in San Francisco on a Romani dinner circus called Circo Romani. After his departure from Someday Lounge, the two consolidated their show under the name of Wanderlust Circus, with Mickens as the ringmaster.

Mickens' circus began doing regular events at the Hippodrome Circus Arts Center, a rehearsal and performance space for circus arts in SE Portland; of which they were the co-directors. Batty's Hippodrome performed at the grand opening November 17, 2007. When the Hippodrome Circus Arts Center closed in 2008, Mickens and Creature moved Wanderlust Circus to the Bossanova Ballroom, where regular shows were hosted until 2010, when Wanderlust Circus moved its main stage to the Alberta Rose Theatre.

In 2012, the Wanderlust Circus Orchestra released their debut EP, Joyous Panic, with Mickens appearing as vocalist.

== Writing, production and directing work ==
Mickens has been listed as director and/or producer of several live performance works, mostly in the Portland area, and performed in each production:

- Societas Insomnia (2004–2007) (director and performer)
- Day of the Zombie (January 13, 2007) (producer, co-director) and July 25, 2008)
- A Midsummer Night's Dream (July 26, 2008) (co-directed with Mizu Desierto)
- Bogville (2008–2011) (co-directed with Tiare "NagaSita" Tashnick)
- Queen of Knives (2010) (director)
- The Mata Hari Hustle (2012) (performer, director)
