= Wanderlust Circus =

- Wanderlust Circus logo.

Origin
- Country: United States
- Founder(s): Noah Mickens; Nick Harbar
- Year founded: 2006

Information
- Traveling show?: Yes
- Circus tent?: No
- Type of acts: Acrobalance, Aerial dance, Belly dancing, Burlesque, Contortionist, Cowboy clown, Freestyle BMX
- Website: wanderlustcircus.com

Wanderlust Circus is a theatrical circus troupe based in Portland, Oregon, founded in 2006 by creative partners Noah Mickens and Nick "The Creature" Harbar. Since 2006, Wanderlust Circus has grown from a small band of creatives to a full-fledged circus troupe, and non-profit organization. The organization presently comprises a team of acrobats, a 10-piece swing band, a trick-roping cowboy clown; and several aerialists, contortionists, hand balancers, jugglers, and dancers. Their most popular recurring shows have been The White Album Christmas, A Circus Carol, and the dance party series MegaBounce.

== History ==
=== Fictional background ===
Victorian English ringmaster William Batty and his spirit cousins, the members of the Wanderlust Circus, are blessed and cursed with conditional immortality: should they ever leave the circus life, their long years will catch up with them leaving them old or even dead. Batty and the Wanderlust Circus all come from different time periods – Victorian England, the Old West, swing-era New York and even the present day. Batty himself is over two hundred years old. Shows follow the troupe's adventures on the road with simple comic stories providing the through line between acts.

=== 2006–2008: Formation, Batty's Hippodrome, Hippodrome Circus Arts Center ===
Mickens and Creature first teamed up in 2006 to form two separate but related circus shows: Wanderlust Circus headed by Creature, and Batty's Hippodrome, led by Mickens and founded during his residency as Creative Director of the now-defunct Someday Lounge.

The pair founded the Hippodrome Circus Arts Center, which opened on November 17, 2007 on the lower floor of the Rotture-Branx venue complex (which itself closed in 2015). Mickens and Creature fused circuses in 2008, under the Wanderlust name, after The Hippodrome's owner decided not to continue the venue.

=== 2008–2011: Bossanova Ballroom, new shows, collaborations, MegaBounce ===
Wanderlust Circus eventually settled into the Bossanova Ballroom, and proceeded to put on a series of shows that lasted through 2010. Some of these shows were seasonally recurring, such as the White Album Christmas show (in collaboration with The Nowhere Band, aka the No Star All Star Band, featuring members of the MarchFourth Marching Band, Solovox, Stereovision, and others), the Cirque L’Amour show for Valentine's Day, and Wonderland Circus, a circus adaptation of Lewis Carroll's Alice in Wonderland with dialogue from the original story. Other shows told the legendary backstory of the Wanderlust Circus itself.

In 2009, Wanderlust Circus performed at the inaugural celebration for then-mayor Sam Adams, alongside MarchFourth Marching Band and Trashcan Joe.

In 2010, Wanderlust Circus performed a specially choreographed epic circus on and around the 60-foot steel fire sculptures of The Big Art Experience at American Steel Studios. They performed similar choreography at LA's Electric Daisy Carnival and Oakland's Sand by the Ton. This series was the result of a collaboration with industrial sculptor Dan Das Mann.

In 2010, Wanderlust Circus & Vagabond Opera co-produced the Queen of Knives theatrical opera. Written by Stern and directed by Mickens; Queen of Knives featured cast members from Vagabond Opera, such as then-cellist Ashia Grzesik; and Wanderlust Circus members like belly dancer NagaSita. Nagasita and Wanderlust Circus also co-produced the multi-episode goth fantasy theatrical series Bogville.

In 2011, Wanderlust introduced two new show formats. Megabounce which premiered on March 12, 2011, is an annual themed audience participation rave format, featuring circus acts set to live electronic dance music sets from internationally renowned DJs, such as DJ Assault, Bunny, Run DMT, Heyoka, and Butch Clancy. The other new format was The Wanderlust Circus Orchestra, an old-time vaudeville style circus, reminiscent of the Spike Jones TV show. This format features circus performances scored by the swing big band of the same name.

=== 2012–? : Alberta Rose Theatre, studio album, Umbrella Festival, and 10th anniversary ===
In 2012, Wanderlust Circus forged a new relationship with the Alberta Rose Theatre, making it their new Portland headquarters for local shows. At the Alberta Rose, Wanderlust Circus developed "A Circus Carol", a theatrical circus retelling of Charles Dickens' A Christmas Carol co-produced by Wanderlust Circus and 3 Leg Torso; as well as the annual Umbrella Festival of Circus & Comedy, a multi-day festival showcasing circus, vaudeville, and cabaret acts from across America. Coinciding with Seattle, Washington's Moisture Festival, the Umbrella Festival was designed to attract national circus performers to the West Coast vaudeville circuit. Umbrella Festival has been well received by local critics.

In 2012, Wanderlust Circus Orchestra released their first full-length album, "Joyous Panic," featuring original songs and jazz standards, like Everybody Loves My Baby and Sunny Side of the Street.

In July 2015, Wanderlust Circus was featured on The Travel Channel's show Watt's World in an episode about Portland, Oregon, alongside Voodoo Doughnut, Darcelle XV, and other Portland counter-cultural attractions.

=== Cultural context ===
Wanderlust Circus spring/summer 2014 roster, left to right: Russell Bruner, NagaSita, Mr. Creature, The Rose City Acro-Devils (Jon Dutch, Anngela Burt, Joesai Carr, Scott Maxwell, Amanda Warren), Brittany Walsh, William Batty, Leapin' Louie Lichtenstein, and the Wanderlust Circus Orchestra (Shoehorn, Anna Leander, Joe Haegele, Paul Evans, Jeff Holt, TJ Arko, Griff Bear, Kristopher White).

Wanderlust Circus is part of a bohemian revival of circus and cabaret artists in the Pacific NW, which began to show its face around the turn of the 21st century. Early examples of this movement include MarchFourth Marching Band (2003, Portland OR), Circus Contraption (Seattle, WA) and the Yard Dogs Road Show (San Francisco, CA), all of whom have collaborated with Wanderlust Circus and some of its previous incarnations. The two founders and directors of the troupe, Noah Mickens and Nick "The Creature" Harbar, each have a long history of producing, directing, and performing in circus shows in the Northwest.

Nick "The Creature" Harbar was born and raised on the road. His parents, Mary Ann Willis and Greg Harbar, were the center of a Houston musical ensemble called The Gypsies starting in the 1960s; and played a large role in bringing traditional Romani musicians to the United States and publishing many of their traditional songs for the first time through Mel Bay Music. Creature himself first gained notoriety in San Francisco as a show producer and facilities manager at influential art collective CELLSpace. While living and working there, he and partner Mike Templeton produced and directed a dinner show called Circo Romani, with musical director Zhenya Kolykhanov of The Red Elvises. Their production company was called The Wanderlust Company. Creature moved to Portland in 2006 and contacted Noah Mickens about working together.

Noah Mickens has created and performed in a great number of shows in Portland dating back to 1999, starting with his experimental music and performance series 36 Invisibles, and working on the board of directors for 2Gyrlz Performative Arts. Prior to 1999, Mickens spent his youth singing in rock bands in L.A. and Kansas City, and spent some of his early teen years as a juggling and contorting street performer. Mickens' first circus venture was Cicuri Curajul, a "fake Romanian Circus" co-produced with Tony St Clair, which debuted on April 25, 2004 at the Crystal Ballroom. Upon the abrupt dissolution of Cicuri Curajul, Mickens and fire martial arts performer David "the Fireninja" founded a ritual performance troupe called Societas Insomnia which lasted from 2004 to 2007. Societas Insomnia featured a variety of performance types meant to evoke a world of nightmares, including fire dancing, suspension, and butoh, along with traditional circus acts and Tuvan throat singing by Enrique Ugalde a.k.a. Soriah, who portrayed the sun. In 2005, Mickens also co-founded and toured with The 999 Eyes of Endless Dream Carnival, an underground freak show, now the 999 Eyes Freakshow, as ringmaster and Master of Ceremonies. While serving as Creative Director of an art bar called Someday Lounge, Mickens returned to a more traditional circus format with a show called Batty's Hippodrome in 2006. Just a few months later, along came Nick the Creature.

Wanderlust Circus heavily tours festival circuits, performing as featured and ambient circus entertainment for Electric Daisy Carnival, Oregon Country Fair, Sasquatch, Paradiso, Tomorrow World, Symbiosis, Lightning in a Bottle, The SF Edwardian Ball, and others. Wanderlust Circus has also toured across the West, including California, Idaho, Montana, Washington and more.

== Wanderlust Circus South (2009–2014) ==
In 2009, Wanderlust Circus acrobat Alexander Dial returned to San Diego, California and established his own circus production company called Otherwise Entertainment. After a year spent establishing his new troupe, Dial took on Wanderlust Circus' name for both his existing and future San Diego projects, calling it Wanderlust Circus South. Wanderlust Circus and her sister company collaborated on shows all along the West Coast, stretching from northern Washington to southern California. Wanderlust Circus South entered a period of indefinite hiatus in 2014.

== Discography ==
- "Joyous Panic" – 2012
