= Eric Stern =

- Born: Philadelphia, Pennsylvania, US
- Genres: Opera, Cabaret, Jazz, Bohemian
- Occupations: Musician, multi-instrumentalist, arranger, composer, songwriter
- Instruments: Vocals, piano, accordion
- Years active: 2002–present
- Website: ericsternevents.com

Eric Stern is an American vocalist, accordionist, composer, arranger, and pianist based in Portland, Oregon, best known as the founder and artistic director of the band Vagabond Opera. He also performs as a soloist, as well as with the Eric Stern Trio. Stern, with Vagabond Opera, has appeared on NPR and performed at the Kennedy Center, the Great American Music Hall in San Francisco, Joe's Pub in New York City.

== Career ==
Stern was born in Philadelphia, Pennsylvania and trained as a vocalist at the Delaware Valley Opera Company. At the age of 21, Stern decided to pursue writing and moved to Paris, returning to the U.S., and to music, a year and a half later.

In 2002, Stern founded the group Vagabond Opera, known for their blend of eclectic musical styles, including German cabaret, Klezmer, and jazz. The band released four albums until their hiatus in 2015. With the band, Stern also wrote, composed and performed the 2010 opera Queen of Knives, in collaboration with Wanderlust Circus.

Stern has recorded and performed with a variety of musical acts including The Decemberists, Balkan Beat Box, Unwoman, Pink Martini, and DeVotchka. In 2011, Stern composed the score for the Tears of Joy Puppet Theatre's production of Pinocchio.

In March 2015, Stern's independent production company, Hungry Opera Machine, debuted its first opera at the Alberta Rose Theatre: Flour, Salt, & Moonbeams. It was well-received by critics.

Stern currently works as the Events Coordinator and Cultural Arts Ambassador for Eastside Jewish Commons, a nonprofit in Portland, Oregon.

== Awards ==
ASCAP Concert Division Panel award recognizing creative contributions to American music (September 2011).

== Discography ==
With Vagabond Opera

- Get on the Train (2004)
- Vagabond Opera (2006)
- The Zeitgeist Beckons (2009)
- Sing For Your Lives (2011)

Solo

- Stern Little Stories (2012)
- Ashes of Rembetiko (2017)
