= House of Stone: Death II =

Studio album by SORNE
- Released: December 23, 2014
- Genre: Avant-pop
- Length: 28:29
- Label: Independent

SORNE chronology
House of Stone: Death I	House of Stone: Death II	House of Stone: Death III

House of Stone: Death II is the second part in a series of concept albums by singer-songwriter and multi-media artist, SORNE, which is based around the story of Sorne's "House of stone" saga. The album feature's Sorne's signature musical sound which involves non-conventional instrumentation and occasional, guitar and piano. The album art as well as the art within the liner notes contain visual art created by Sorne, as well as a description of the story of the album.

== Concept and storyline ==
This is the second album in a concept album series that tells the story of five siblings who serve and the princes and princesses of the "House of stone". Continuing where the previous album left off, the album opens with the first born and his army invading the first territory of the vergebian union. Bringing violence and destruction into the city reclaiming what was once theirs. As the city is finally vanquished, the first born wanders through the charred ruins, grieving over the memory of his father who was murdered by his hand. He then comes across the corpse of a young boy that looked to be in his early teens. Seeing this brings him back to the time when his father trained him to become the warrior he is and becoming mute from the abusive upbringing his father put him through in his training. His heart goes out to the dead child. He then hears a noise coming from a nearby house, which he enters and finds a little girl underneath the floorboards who looks to be no older than 3 years. He then began to strangle the child as it was his duty to find survivors and kill them on sight. As he does this he gets flashbacks of the violence inflicted upon him by his father and becomes overwhelmed with empathy for the child. He then starts to cry finding that he cannot kill her. He then gently cradles the child and carries her safely out of the house, covering her eyes so she doesn't see the corpses of her parents. The first born takes the child in as his daughter and vows to save and protect her. The second sun who is the new king of the house of stone, receives a message, from the vergebian union warning him to end the violent acts towards their cities. Upon hearing this message, he recalls a time when he witnessed his father beating his brother the first born, bringing him to strike his father in order to defend his brother. This prompts the second sun to send a reply to the vergebian union, declaring open war upon the remaining territories. The black sister, (the oldest sibling of the family) is still in mourning over the death of her father whom she dearly loved. She had an incest relationship with him, siring her brother the first born as her child. She offers to care for the child along with the first born knowing that her brother the second sun would have the child killed. The album concludes with the vergebian union in a final attempt to establish peace with the house of stone sending a diplomat to speak with the second sun. When the diplomat arrives, the second sun has the first born decapitate him. The second son then places the diplomat's head into a box along with an explosive, sending it back to the vergebian union. The emissaries delivering this message were ordered to inform the union of absolute defiance and conviction to vanquish anyone who got in the way of their mission.

== Track listing ==
Music, lyrics and story by Morgan Sorne

No.	Title	Length
1.	"White wall wasteland"	3:40
2.	"Unnamed"	3:39
3.	"Gut-Shot Soldier"	3:56
4.	"Angel of death"	4:00
5.	"Fragle Frame"	4:07
6.	"Black Sister"	4:46
7.	"Bloodstar"	5:09

== Personnel ==
- SORNE: Lead and backing vocals, alternative instrumentation, guitar, keyboards.
