= Interstate Firehouse Cultural Center =

Building in Portland, Oregon, U.S.

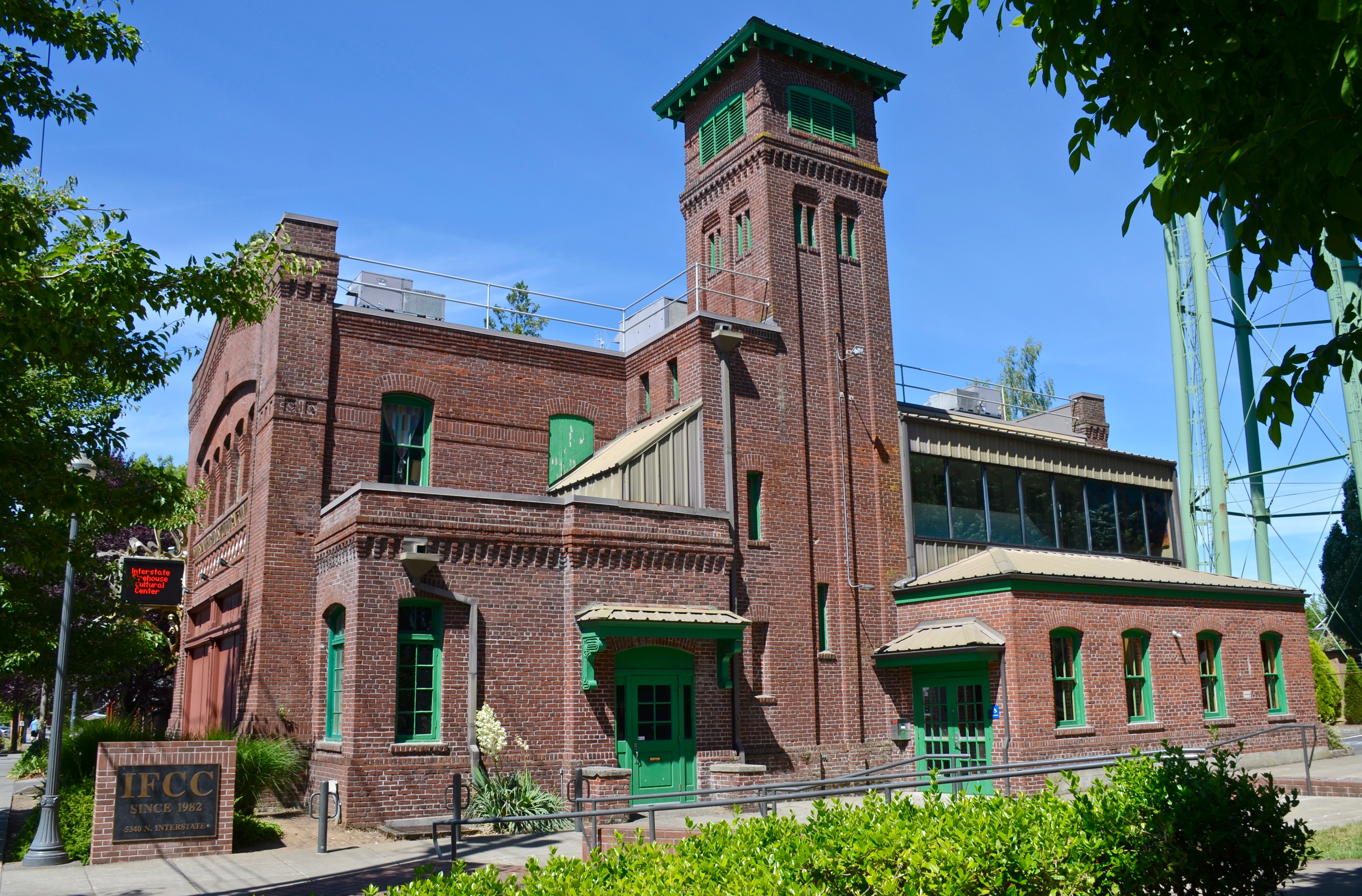
- The Interstate Firehouse Cultural Center in 2015
- Address: 5340 North Interstate Avenue
- Location: North Portland, Oregon
- Operator: City of Portland
- Capacity: 99
- Type: Cultural Center

Construction
- Built: 1910
- Opened: 1982

Website
- Ethos / IFCC Home Page

The Interstate Firehouse Cultural Center (IFCC) is a community-based arts center located in North Portland, Oregon, United States.

== Description and history ==
The IFCC was founded in 1982 by Portland's first African-American elected official, Commissioner Charles Jordan. The IFCC is located in a 1910-built former fire station at 5340 North Interstate Avenue and now contains a 99-seat theater, an art gallery, and space for rehearsal or classes.

The center's mission statement states that the IFCC, "is committed to creating an environment in which people of every ethnic/cultural background come together as artists and audience to explore, preserve and celebrate their diversity."

The building has been designated a Portland Historic Landmark by the city's Historic Landmarks Commission, under the name Interstate Firehouse #24. It is owned by Portland Parks & Recreation, a City of Portland Bureau, and was managed by IFCC, Inc. until May 2010, when that non-profit ceased operations. In August 2010, management authority was given to Ethos Music Center by a unanimous vote of the Portland city council.

The opera Queen of Knives, had its world premiere at the center on May 7, 2010.

On December 31, 2014, Ethos returned management of the building to the City of Portland.

== See also ==
- Culture of Portland, Oregon
- Firefighting in Oregon
