= Queen of Knives =

2010 opera in two acts by Eric Stern

Queen of Knives is an opera in two acts by the American composer Eric Stern. The English libretto was written by the composer. The opera premiered in Portland, Oregon, on May 7, 2010, at the Interstate Firehouse Cultural Center. Noah Mickens directed the premiere and the opera was produced by Vagabond Opera and Wanderlust Circus.

== Production history ==
Queen of Knives premiered at the Interstate Firehouse Cultural Center In Portland, Oregon, May 7, 2010, and ran for a two-week extended run, for a total of ten performances.

== Roles and original cast ==
- Esmeralda: Catherine Olson
- Henry: Scott Crandal
- Chaim Meyer: Eric Stern
- Promethia: Nagasita
- Alfred: Robin Jackson
- The Blackbird Katrina: Ashia Grzesik
- The Belly Dancer: Ruby Beh/Tiffany Slottke
- Roustabouts: Xander Almeida, Rale Sidebottom, Hioka

=== Musical Ensemble ===
Musical Director: Eric Stern; Tenor Saxophone, Clarinet: Robin Jackson; Trumpet: Kate Presley; Percussion: Mark Burdon; Piano, Accordion: Eric Stern; Violin: Griff Bear;Cello: Skip Von Kuske; Bass: Matthew Rotchford

== Synopsis ==
Set in the early 1960s in a traveling carnival in the midst of the student protests in Birmingham, Alabama, the opera tells the story of a brother and sister knife-throwing act.

== Sources ==
- D'Antoni, Vagabond Opera's Opera: Eric Stern on 'Queen of Knives', Oregon Music News, May 5, 2010
- Interstate Firehouse Cultural Center, Queen of Knives: A Knife Throwing Bullseye Opera
- McQuillen, James, Opera review: "Portland's Vagabond Opera's 'Queen of Knives' is one sharp show", The Oregonian, May 11, 2010
- Oregon Music News, "Vagabond Opera announces they're really doing an opera", March 3, 2010
