= House of Stone: Death IIII =

Studio album by SORNE
- Released: September 29, 2015
- Genre: Avant-Pop
- Label: Independent

SORNE chronology
House of Stone: Death III	House of Stone: Death IIII

House of Stone: Death IIII is the fourth part in a series of concept albums by singer-songwriter and multi-media artist Sorne. It is based on the story of Sorne's "House of Stone" saga. The album features Sorne's signature musical sound which involves non-conventional instrumentation and occasional, guitar and piano. The album art and the art in the liner notes contain visual art created by Sorne, and a description of the story of the album.

== Concept and storyline ==
This is the fourth album in a concept album series that tells the story of 5 siblings who serve and the princes and princesses of the "House of stone". Continuing where the previous album left off, the army of the vergebian union led by General Vagus, surrounds the house of stone in preparation for battle as a response to the violence inflicted upon their land and people, by the house of stone's new king, the second sun.

The backstory of the blue sister, the youngest sibling of the family, is then introduced. As a child her father attempted to rape her. She resisted and fought back, which angered the father prompting him to brutally wound her face, so that no man would want her. She came into the room of her older brother, the first-born, horrified and crying. Her brother feared for her life, and arranged for her to be sent away to the south. Upon hearing of the death of her father, she returned home to the first born to help him, despite her strong fear.

The story transitions to the black sister, who suffers a deep depression from the loss of her father and lover, and from the doom that awaits her kingdom. Her sadness has grown strong enough to drive her far within the depths of insanity. She begins to hallucinate seeing her father in front of her, who she loved and had an incestuous relationship with as a teenager resulting in the birth of her brother and son, the first-born. She begs the vision of her father to end the madness in their kingdom and family. The blue sister returns to her kingdom through the passages that her brother helped her escape in. She sees her brother for the first time in 20 years, and they embrace, crying and overjoyed to see each-other. The first-born is finally reunited with the emotion that had left him when he lost his sister.

The blue sister begins to converse with the first-born about what she's been through for the 20 years that they've been separated. The first-born then introduces his sister to his adopted daughter and the blue sister offers to become her protector should anything happen to the first-born. She offers to hide with the child to take care of her before the battle begins. As the vergebian soldiers arrive at the borders of the house of stone. The second sun sounds the call to arms, ordering the full population of the kingdom to prepare for the final battle against the vergebian union.

The album concludes with the black sister speaking to the little brother about her pain and sadness for the lack of escape from the doom that approaches their kingdom. Out of empathy for his sister's pain, he was motivated to devise an idea that could possibly save his family and the kingdom. He was a well-known homosexual prostitute during his wandering years, with a talent for seduction. His plan was to infiltrate the enemy camps and offer himself to General Vagus, so that after seducing him, he can kill him, rendering the vergebian armies vulnerable. Knowing that this plan might kill him, he agrees to set this plan in motion to atone for all the death and pain he brought. He believes that doing this will return him into the favor of his father that he longed for, all the years he was exiled.

== Track listing ==
Music, lyrics and story by Morgan Sorne

No.	Title	Length
1.	"Million Man March"	2:52
2.	"Oh My God"	4:52
3.	"Star of mercy"	4:43
4.	"Humbled Hands"	4:29
5.	"Lone and Lost"	4:46
6.	"Call to Arms"	6:51
7.	"Darkness"	6:15

== Personnel ==
- SORNE: Lead and backing vocals, alternative instrumentation, guitar, keyboards.
