= Kēvens =

Musician, and Vocalist

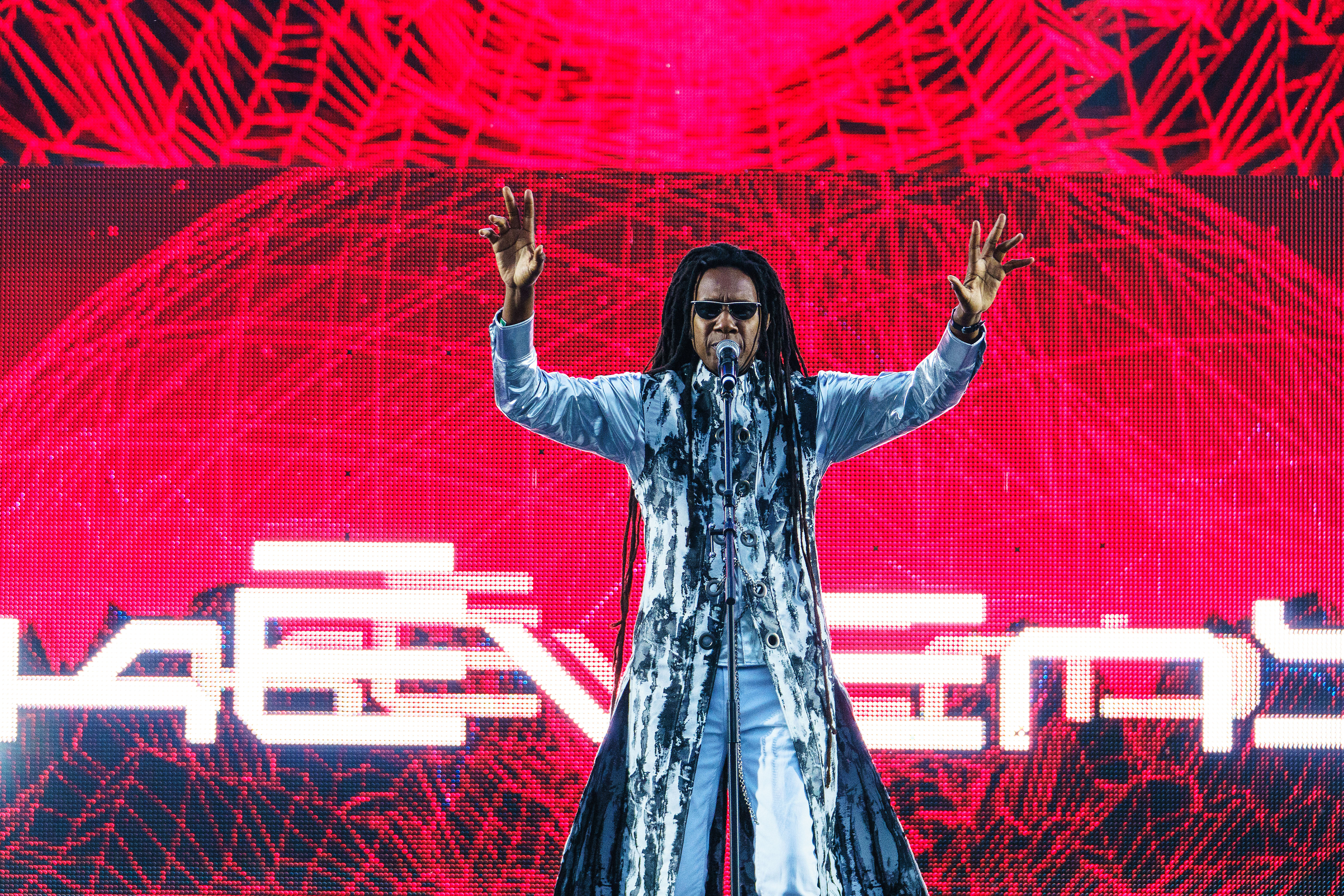
- Kēvens performing at Seoul Olympic Stadium in South Korea in 2018

Background information
- Born: Kēvens Bendix Celestine
- Origin: Miami, Florida, U.S.
- Genres: ReggaeEDM; Rock; reggae; EDM; dub
- Occupation(s): Singer, songwriter, actor, activist, music producer
- Years active: 1997-present
- Labels: KTF Music
- Website: www.kevens.com

Kēvens is an American singer from Miami, Florida. He is best known for his 2023 single "Legal Dreamers", which peaked atop the Jamaican Singles Charts.

Kēvens is known for pioneering the ReggaeEDM genre, which he coined in 1998. His music draws inspiration from the vibrant jungle beats of the 1990s. He has performed at the inaugural 1999 Ultra Music Festival in Miami Ultra Korea in Seoul, Korea, the Root Society Dome at Burning Man, at the Black Rock Desert, Nevada, the White Nights Festival in St. Petersburg, Russia and the One Love Fest in Takamatsu, Japan.

== Early career ==
Kēvens started in the music business in Miami as a DJ and MC. He was part of the Miami-based group Le Coup founded by Bob Marley's half brothers Richard and Anthony Booker. Le Coup disbanded in 1997 and Kēvens continued a relationship with the Marley family occasionally performing with Stephen Marley, Damian Marley, and Julian Marley.

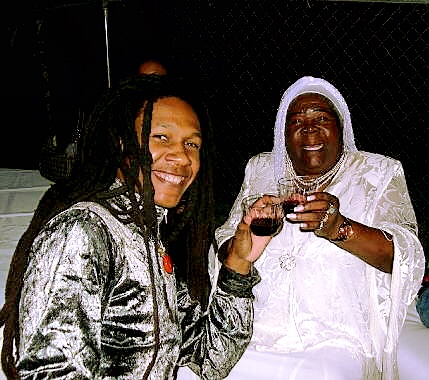
Kēvens with Cedella Booker

After his time with Le Coup ended, Kēvens moved his career towards genre-crossing explorations of rock, trip-hop, drum and bass and EDM, while maintaining his reggae foundation. He created a variety of live acts to be a feature at different festivals throughout the world.

Kēvens has released one full studio album called, We Are One (in 2010) and a variety of singles since 2000. In 2018, he released the single, Sweet Lady Liberty of which FSHN Magazine said "Timing couldn't be more perfect for a new anthem that everyone can relate to and breaks down barriers in an era where hatred and divide seem more prominent than ever."

On October 11, 2024, Kēvens released his second album, Call To Balance. The album has been embraced by the international community with Spain's OCIMAG calling it "one of the most powerful releases of the year within the scene that embraces - equally - electronic music and ancestral roots." Rolling Stones Magazine described the track, “'Save Me'(as) a good reflection of that journey of multiculturalism, spiritual search and positive vibes” - the very qualities that have earned Kēvens admiration from his international fanbase.

I'm going to make sure whatever I sing or write is timeless

— Kēvens

== Live performances ==
In 2008, Kēvens headlined North America's largest Pow-wow the Gathering of Nations in Albuquerque, New Mexico. In 2012, a new two-day, multistage concert called the UR1 music festival was scheduled to be held in downtown Miami and coincide with Art Basel. Kēvens was scheduled to perform, bringing his unique brand of live-dubstep-reggae-rock to the main stage at UR1 to open for Kravitz and Jane's Addiction.

In 2013, Kēvens, alongside the Jacksons and others, participated in the White Nights Festival, an annual summer festival, and one of the most popular in St. Petersburg, Russia. The festival was broadcast throughout Russia, and the Russian territories to an estimated audience of 50 million on Channel One Russia.

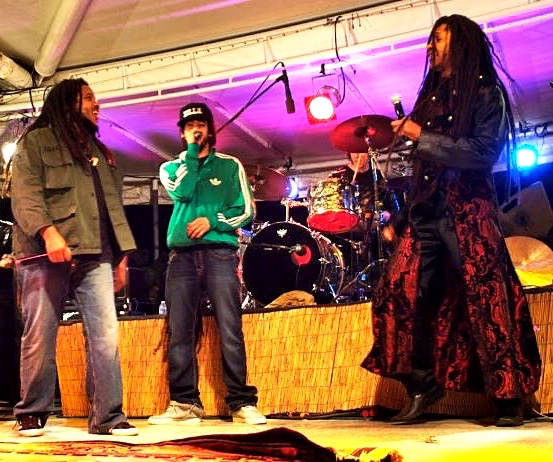
Kēvens performing with Stephen Marley and Damian Marley

In June 2018, he performed at the newer extension of the festival as part of the UMF worldwide expansion, Ultra Korea in Seoul, South Korea, and held at the 69,950 seats Seoul Olympic Stadium. Artists included Axwell & Ingrosso, Zhu, Above & Beyond, Steve Angello, and culminated with The Chainsmokers on the main stage as the closing act. On the Live Stage known Korean artists, Drunken Tiger, Bizzy, and Yoon Mi-rae performed, and female, South Korean rapper and singer-songwriter, CL. During the show, Kēvens was fortunate to share the stage with American Rap legend Ice Cube the headliner on the Live Stage.

== Musical career ==
According to Miami.com, Kēvens is "one of the first to blend a live band with electronic dance music" and name his particular style of fusion "an exceptionally unique sound." In 2001, Jane's Addiction frontman Perry Farrell, also performing on the Zen Music Festival 2000 lineup, and was featured on the cover of MIXER magazine (the U.S. subsidiary of Mixmag) in 2001. Farrell is quoted, "...people have commented to me that the DJ Culture is drying up. I look at them and want to smack them. The only thing that it needs is to be infused with live players." Farrell identified groups developing as "live performers". He continued, "Kēvens [sic] in Miami and Roni Size too. This is where the music is heading."

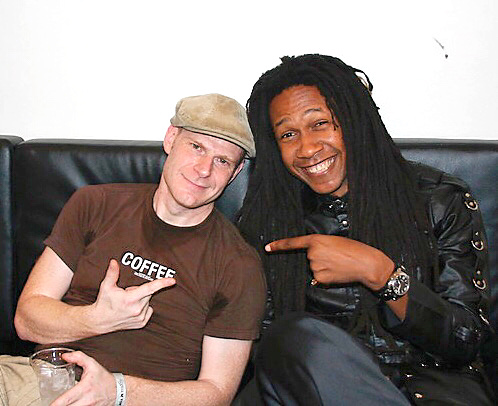
Junkie XL & Kēvens

He has also performed with such acts as Damian Marley, Junkie XL, Stephen Marley, Rabbit in the Moon, Heavyweight Dub Champion, and Liberation Movement, who described his style as "theatrical rock reggae".

People Magazine recognizes Kēvens "as the creator of the ReggaeEDM genre, a mix of reggae and rock" that fuses elements jungle, reggae and live drum and bass. He first coining the term "ReggaeEDM" in 1998 to describe his distinctive sound at the Florida Zen Music Festival. Since then, the genre has expanded in influence, with artists such as Major Lazer, Thievery Corporation, Asian Dub Foundation, Adrian Sherwood, Skrillex and many others contributing to its evolution.

== Discography ==
=== Singles ===
- We Play Music - Felli & Buddy vs Bassbin Twins featuring MC Kēvens. (2000).
- Sunshine (Feat. Kēvens)- Milissa. (2011). Milissa.
- My Baby Boo (Radio Mix). (2012) KTF Publishing.
- My Baby Boo (Club Mix). (2012) KTF Publishing.
- We're Alive - Electrik Dread feat. Kēvens. (2014) Nine Mile Entertainment, Inc.
- We're Alive (Riddler Remix) - Electrik Dread feat. Kēvens. (2014) Nine Mile Entertainment.
- Find Your Light. (2014) KTF Music.
- Bright & Beautiful (EKTO1 Remix). (2016) KTF Music.
- Positivity (Feat. Kēvens & JLB) - DJ Short-E & LP. (2016) SoulPro Music.
- Bright & Beautiful (feat. Kaukuta). (2016) KTF Publishing.
- All in Love (feat. Kēvens) - Hook Shop & Sly & Robbie. (2017) Michael Henry.
- Sweet Lady Liberty (2018) KTF Music.
- Sweet Lady Liberty (Tech House Remix). (2018) KTF Music.
- I'll Be There. (2019) KTF Music.
- World is Burning. (2020) KTF Music.
- Wine. (2020) KTF Music.
- Battle for Peace. (2020) KTF Music.
- Legal Dreamers. (2023) KTF Music.
- Sweet Lady Liberty (Radio Mix). (2023) KTF Music.

=== Albums ===
- Call To Balance. (2024). KTF Music.
- We Are One. (2010). Rum Bum Music.

=== Video games ===
- Dance Celebration - Bill Hamel feat. Kēvens. Dance Dance Revolution X. (2009). Konami.
- Dance Celebration (System 7 Remix) - Bill Hamel feat. Kēvens. Dance Dance Revolution X. (2009). Konami.

== Filmography ==
=== Film ===
Year	Title	Role	Notes
2019	Escape Halloween	Witch Doctor	Video Short
2012	Miami II Ibiza	Himself	Film
2003	Hey DJ	Himself	Film
2001	Smokin' Stogies	Thomas	Short Film
1998	DV8	Shaba	Video
1997	Miami	Himself	Film

=== Television ===
Year	Title	Role	Notes
1997	Fox Baseball Featuring Ryan Klesko (Atlanta Braves)	Dealer 1	TV Commercial
1996	Pulmex Featuring Switzerland	Singer	TV Commercial
1994	The Lilt Man	Jevan	TV Commercial
1994	Appleton Estate Jamaica Rum	Trumpet Player	TV Commercial
