= House of Stone: Death I =

Studio album by SORNE
- Released: March 11, 2014
- Genre: Avant-pop
- Length: 31:37
- Label: Independent

SORNE chronology
House of stone	House of Stone: Death I	House of Stone: Death II

House of Stone: Death I is the first part in a series of concept albums by singer-songwriter and multi-media artist, SORNE, which is based around the story of Sorne's "House of stone" saga. The album features Sorne's signature musical sound which involves non-conventional instrumentation and occasional, guitar and piano. The album art as well as the art within the liner notes contain visual art created by Sorne, as well as a description of the story of the album.

== Concept and storyline ==
This is the first album in a concept album series that tells the story of five siblings who serve and the princes and princesses of the "House of stone". It opens with the funeral of their father, the king, who was murdered by the hands of the first born. It is revealed that the first born was manipulated by his brother the second sun into committing the act. After the deed is done they set forth their plan to take back the land that was given away by their father. The oldest sibling of the bunch, the black sister observes the funeral in sadness and loses hope for the well being of the kingdom. It is revealed in the story that she had an incest relationship with her father as a teen which resulted in her giving birth to her brother and son the first born, as it was part of the family custom to bear a purebred son. As she saw her father being cremated she knew right away that her brother the second sun was responsible for her father's death. She then has a premonition of the downfall of their kingdom. The story transitions to the Second sun standing before his people and proclaiming himself as the new king of the house of stone. He reveals his new plan to restore the glory and power of his kingdom and bring back the honor to his family that he feels his father failed to maintain. The first born's back story is then revealed, showing that he has been trained by his father to be warrior. A feared killer, who became mute and emotionless after years of physical and psychological abuse from his father. He is also shown to be a hermaphrodite, as result of his birth from an incest relationship, between his father and the black sister. The first born and the second son prepare to begin their mission to invade and reclaim the vergebian union(The neighboring territory which was given away by their father). The album concludes with the first born leading his army into the first vergebian territory. As he prepares for the invasion he recalls his hand in the murder of his father with mixed emotions and says a prayer to his guiding star.

== Track listing ==
Music, lyrics and story by Morgan Sorne

No.	Title	Length
1.	"Holy"	3:05
2.	"Rite and Reign"	2:29
3.	"One eyed king"	3:18
4.	"Eat your young"	5:09
5.	"Blood and water"	3:47
6.	"All is falling"	6:47
7.	"Atmosphere of the sky"	6:46

== Personnel ==
- SORNE: Lead and backing vocals, alternative instrumentation
