= Olivia Arévalo =

Peruvian traditional healer and environmental activist (1937–2018)

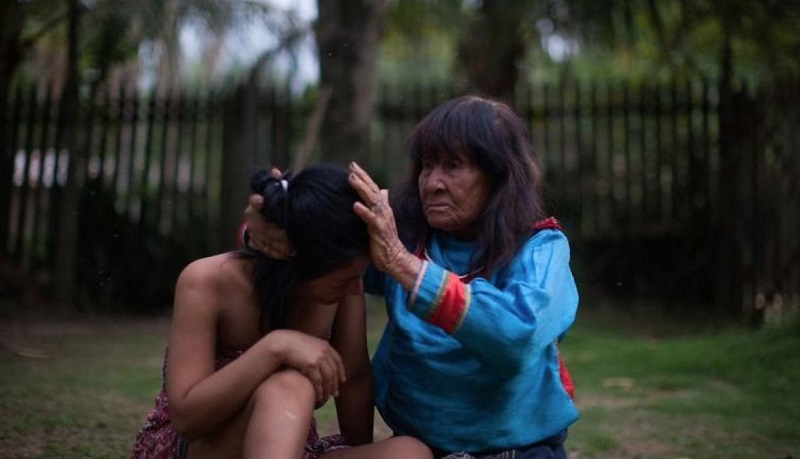
Olivia Arévalo

Olivia Arévalo Lomas (February 1937 – 19 April 2018) was a Peruvian Onanya of Shipibo-Conibo Indigenous people of Ucayali region, a Ayahuasca plant medicine healer, and environmental and cultural rights activist. She advocated “for the recognition of indigenous communities' rights and the preservation of their ancestral territories.” She was also "considered a wealth of knowledge about Amazonian plants and native traditions."

== Life and career ==
Olivia Arévalo Lomas was born in February 1937 in the village of Victoria Gracia in Peru's central Amazon region of Ucayali. Between 2009 and 2011, Arévalo worked at the Temple of the Path of Light, a traditional medicine center in Peru.

She briefly appeared in films directed by Jan Kounen that made her known outside of Peru. These films are Other Worlds (2005) and 8 (2008). She also sang sacred songs. She is featured on the Resurrector produced album Onáyabaon Bewá – Messages from Mother Earth, as part of the Liberation Movement, a music and art collective founded in 2010 in San Francisco.

== Death ==
Arévalo was murdered on 19 April 2018 near her home, Coronel Portillo Province, Ucayalí, Peru. She was “shot twice in her chest” allegedly by Sebastian Woodroffe, a native of Vancouver Island, Canada, who was later killed by a group of locals. Woodroffe is believed to have travelled to Peru to study hallucinogenic medicine to treat drug addictions so he could become a counselor for drug addicts. He lived in the region and was believed to be one of Arévalo's patients at the Temple of the Path of Light. Officials later backtracked on reports that claimed Woodroffe was the principal suspect.
