= House of Stone: Death III =

Studio album by SORNE
- Released: September 29, 2015
- Genre: Avant-Pop
- Label: Independent

SORNE chronology
House of Stone: Death II	House of Stone: Death III	House of Stone: Death IIII

House of Stone: Death III is the third part in a series of concept albums By singer-songwriter and multi-media artist, SORNE, which is based around the story of Sorne's "House of stone" saga. The album feature's Sorne's signature musical sound which involves non-conventional instrumentation and occasional, guitar and piano. The album art as well as the art within the liner notes contain visual art created by Sorne, as well as a description of the story of the album.

== Concept and storyline ==
This is the third album in a concept album series that tells the story of five siblings who serve and the princes and princesses of the "House of stone". It introduces the character, known in the story as "The little brother". He is a homosexual who as a child was condemned by his father for loving another boy. He was forced by his father to drown his lover in order rid the unholy lust that his father saw in him. His father chastised him and exiled him from the kingdom. He then developed a lust for blood and spent next phase of his life roaming the lands outside the house of stone finding new lovers and killing them in order to quench it. The ghost of his dead lover often haunts him both in the day and at night in his dreams. Meanwhile, the vergebian union receives the head of the emissary that was sent by the second sun. This was viewed as the final transgression, leaving the union no choice but to send an army to wipe out the house of stone and put an end to the violence they've brought upon their people. The black sister hears of this and becomes overwhelmed with fear for her kingdom and anger towards the second sun. She is aware of the power of the vergebian union's military and predicts the downfall of the house of stone. As she lays in her bed crying in fear, awaiting the end of her family's kingdom, she suddenly sees a figure in her window gazing up at the moon. She finds this figure to be the little brother, whom she has not seen since he was exiled. He returned to the kingdom after hearing of the death of his father. He revealed to the black sister the desire in his heart to murder his lovers and she brought him back under her care. As he recalls the life he lived he became stricken with a broken heart and seeks the love of his father. He then comes to the decision to defend the house of stone. The story then goes back to the first born, who with his newfound daughter recalls the time when he helped his youngest sister escape the house of stone. One night when his sister was 8 years old she came into her brother's room crying with several scars on her face inflicted by her father, as her father tried to rape her and she fought back. The first born knew in that moment her life was in danger and had her sent to the south. It was through this experience that the first born shut off all emotion in his heart and became mute, accepting his destiny as his father's warrior prince. From his room he had a 360 degree view of his country and as he gazed out past the borders he saw the armies of the vergebian union preparing to annihilate the house of stone once and for all. The house of stone has a population of 500,000 men women and children who are all trained for battle combat. Although they are prepared for the arrival of the union's armies they are vastly outnumbered. The album concludes with the first born becoming overwhelmed with dread and fearing for his daughter for he knows the fate of his kingdom is near.

== Track listing ==
Music, lyrics and story by Morgan Sorne

No.	Title	Length
1.	"Alive"	2:39
2.	"Little Brother"	4:54
3.	"Vergebens"	4:15
4.	"Candlelit Cannibal"	4:21
5.	"Eloi! Eloi!"	5:10
6.	"Solace"	2:26
7.	"Dust to Dust"	4:03

== Personnel ==
- SORNE: Lead and backing vocals, alternative instrumentation, guitar, keyboards
- Jerad Fox: Mastering
