= Heavyweight Dub Champion =

American hip hop group

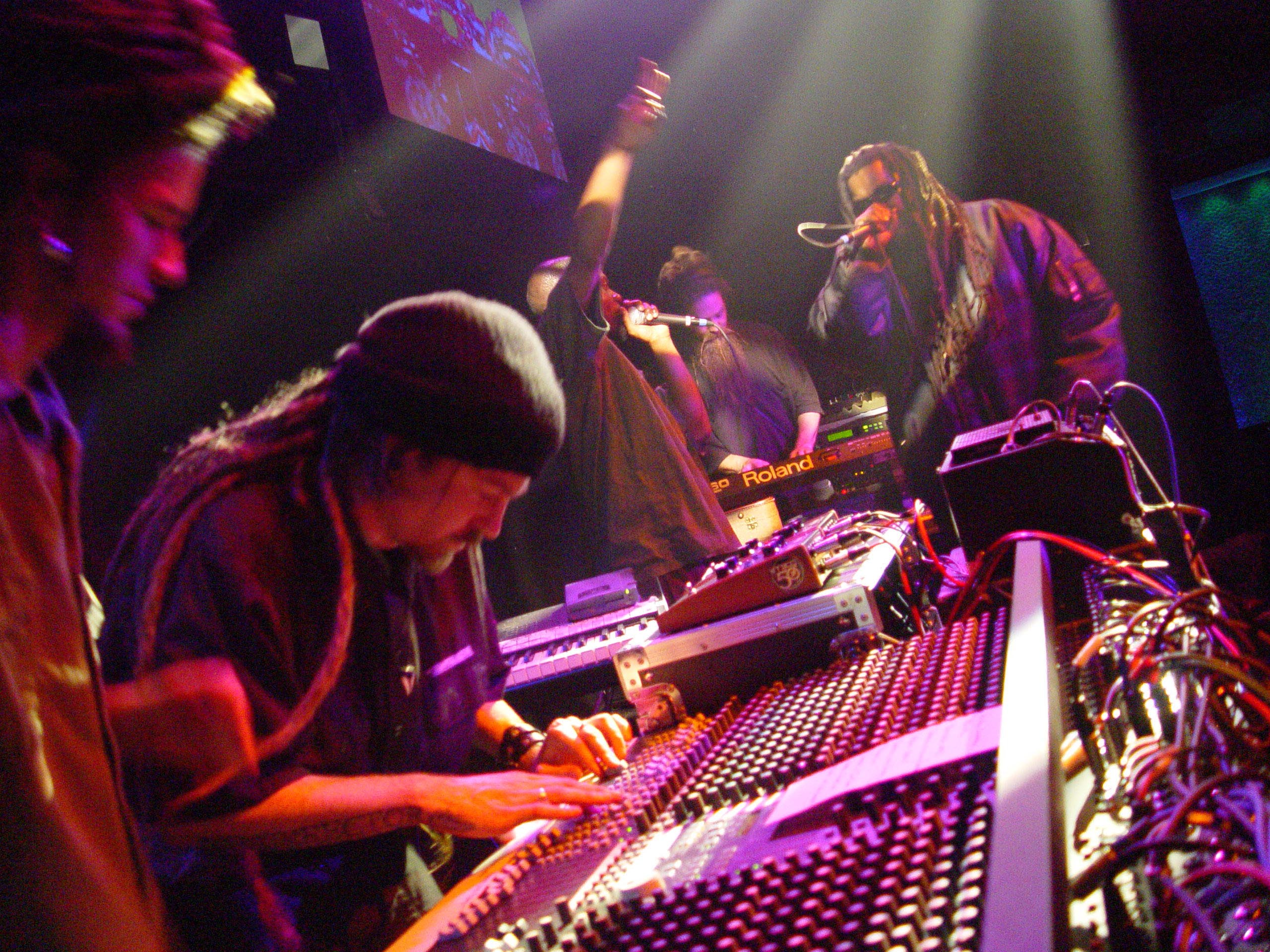
- Heavyweight Dub Champion performing at Get Freaky, 1015 Folsom, San Francisco 2006

Background information
- Origin: San Francisco
- Genres: Electronica, dub, hip hop, trip hop, electro-industrial, reggae fusion
- Years active: 1997 – present
- Labels: Champion Nation Recordings; What Are Records? (compilation only)
- Members: Resurrector, Dr. Israel, Stero-Lion, Wailer B, Totter Todd, Apostle
- Website: www.championnation.net

Heavyweight Dub Champion is a music and art collective founded in Gold Hill, Colorado in 1997 by Resurrector & Patch. Heavyweight Dub Champion, also known as HDC, is rooted in electronic music, but they create their unique style by using real and acoustic instruments fused with synthetic and electronic elements. In 2005, they relocated to San Francisco, but the members of their constantly rotating lineup also come from New York, Australia and the UK. Denver's Westword Magazine describes their music as "a shamanistic wall of hip hop dubtronica" and the magazine awarded their debut album Survival Guide for the End of Time with the editors pick for Best Local Recording in 2003. HDC is perhaps best known for their live performance, in which they use a massive amount of vintage and electronic gear to perform what they call "Sonic Shamanistic Alchemy". The LA Weekly says, "The main HDC aesthetic is a cooled-out groove ... Their genius is the great virtue of '70s dub: never overdoing it."

== Membership ==
The band lineup of Heavyweight Dub Champion, for both studio albums and live performance, is an ever changing organic unit. The only person always involved in every aspect is co-founder Resurrector. Both Studio albums are produced by Resurrector and Patch. The debut album, Survival Guide For The End of Time, incorporates contributions from a vast array of artists, including A.P.O.S.T.L.E., Stero-Lion, Wailer B, Elon, Emcee Vill, J Criminology, Totter Todd, Jack Ruby Jr., DJ Hot Daddi 36-O, and others. Since the release of Survival Guide the membership has expanded to include Lady K, Dr. Israel, Elf Tranzporter, DJ Illnaughty, Dakini Star, Jillian Ann, Noah King, Sasha Rose and 2009's "Rise of the Champion Nation" includes album appearances by KRS-One and Killah Priest. In addition to musical performance, HDC often collaborates live with visual artists such as Unstoppable One, Jher 451, King Mob and Free Speech TV. "We have all kinds of artists on our album and it doesn't matter if they're white, black, Australian, or whatever – everyone's tied together by the same spiritual message," says Resurrector.

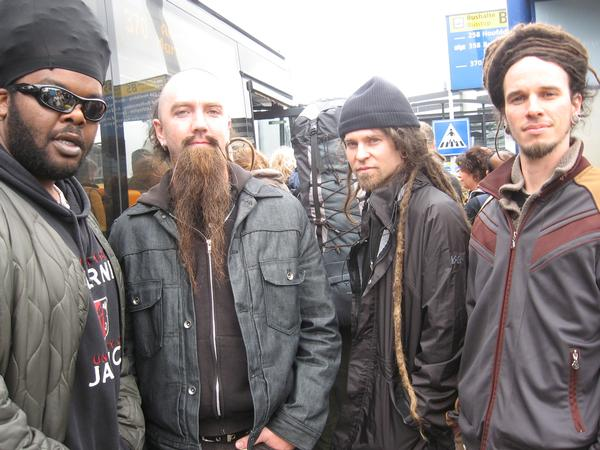
(from left to right) Stero-Lion, Totter Todd, Resurrector and Patch in Amsterdam, 2007

== Formation & History ==
Heavyweight Dub Champion was founded in Colorado in the Spring of 1997 by Resurrector and Patch after the demise of Roots Revolt, a Boulder, Colorado Reggae/Hip hop band from 1995 to 1997 of which they and others in HDC were members. While in Gold Hill, "They hunkered down in a sonic laboratory – a log cabin equipped with an outhouse and no running water – and began to shape their music. Eventually, they conceived a kind of soundtrack for their shared end-time scenario: a heavyweight knockdown between the Last Champion and the forces that threaten to imprison the planet," says Westword Magazine. Resurrector described their roots, "In Gold Hill, we were so close to the natural course of existence ... Our band is based on cosmic relationships, and it really helped to create the rhythm of our music."

Today Heavyweight Dub Champion is known for using a large amount of analog and digital gear on stage, similar to the Chemical Brothers, but in the beginning, they weren't into electronic music. As Resurrector puts it in a 2007 interview, "At first there were no electronic instruments involved. We weren't very interested in electronic music in those days ... Using this old 4-track we started making all these beats with the essential focus on rocking and shaking interdimensional spirit beings." A focus of the Heavyweight Dub Champion experience, as described by former lead vocalist A.P.O.S.T.L.E. (an acronym for Ascending Power Over Secular Territories Liberating Earthlings), who joined the group in 1998, "is trying to present a new paradigm of how people view spirituality. We're trying to evoke a spiritual experience."

=== Survival Guide For The End of Time ===
In 2002, HDC released their debut album, Survival Guide For The End of Time- "an ill-bent mix of industrial apocalyptic hip-hop dubtronica" that "aims to topple the foundations of modern-day Babylon" as well as offering "prescriptions for survival and victory in a tension-filled time." The album was recorded and mixed in Colorado and Los Angeles and "can safely be called a concept album". As described by Resurrector, Survival Guide "relates to the coming of the Last Champion, an interdimensional spiritual warrior, who is bringing people together throughout the world to try to elevate consciousness in a way that will focus people on the healing of themselves and the healing of the world, and help put people in a more offensive position."

Survival Guide has an ambitious package including the band's credo, Last Champion Manifesto, a 70-page booklet "detailing their mission of 'Unconditional Liberation of the Human Race,'" a poster by Jher 451 and sticker of their "protector" logo. As described by Denver's Westword Magazine, "Structurally, the record moves from the announcement of the battle to the rallying calls of the Last Champion's chosen army – followers who unite to liberate individuals and the Earth – to the eventual announcement of the Last Champion as a victor in the championship against predators who have put a stranglehold on humanity's innate desire to creatively seek truth, beauty, pleasure and power." The album's manifesto has chapters which follow the story, or the album could be seen as the soundtrack to the book.

=== Rise Of The Champion Nation ===
Heavyweight Dub Champion's follow up album (a "limited edition" was released at shows in Fall of 2008) includes guest appearances and endorsements from KRS-One, who states in the title track, "Heavyweight Dub Champion restores all hope", Killah Priest and Brooklyn Dub pioneer Dr. Israel, in addition to the familiar cast of A.P.O.S.T.L.E. and others. The project was mixed by Bill Laswell's veteran engineer Oz Fritz and is mastered by industry favorite Brian Gardner. The album is conceptual following "the Warrior" from the Arrival, through Warrior Divination One, Two and Three, to emerge as King Of The Mountain and the eventual journey ends with Promised Land. Throughout the album the character of Emcee Vill is again beckoned to by "N.A.F. Agents" while on his quest to infiltrate Champion Nation and assassinate the Last Champion. Pop Matters describes the album as using "socially conscience and spiritual weapons of words to tell a story whose central plot leads to a philosophical and spiritual revival and a genuine awakening of the human spirit ... (with) an apocalyptic and epic cinematic soundtrack."

Reviewed by Derek Beres in the Huffington Post, he calls the album "A conversion, the ending of an era, a new dawn". He goes on, "Their hope might feel bitter to the taste, but only because they are correctly reflecting reality. By the glean of their astute and painstaking cultural observations, we are invited to join into their dance. It may require we pound our fists and wave our heads—their trance is fitful, not wistful ... this band does achieve greatness." Music Connection Magazine describes the album as "A consortium of prophets heralding our doomed planet."

A song from this album titled "Return of the Champion" was featured as one of the many pre-loaded songs in the then popular Sandisk's Sansa E200R series (Rhapsody version).

Heavyweight Dub Champion restores all hope

— KRS-One, from Rise of the Champion Nation

=== Collaborations ===
In 2006, prominent West Coast Breaks DJ Bassnectar remixed Arrival from then not yet released Rise album. It features vocals from KRS-One, A.P.O.S.T.L.E. and Stero-Lion. The track was included on Bassnectar's Om Records releaseYo EP as well as his double full length Mesmerizing the Ultra released by Organic Records. In 2008, New Zealand native Freq Nasty remixed Snared featuring vocals from Stero-Lion for an album benefiting his Water Of Life campaign for giveback.net- a project to bring water to communities in Ethiopia. Both HDC and Freq Nasty performed at 2008 Harmony Festival which backed the project. The album also includes tracks from Damian Marley, Cheb i Sabbah, and others. In an interview, Resurrector described the band's intention behind doing the project, "our collaboration with FreQ Nasty is an example of musical power in action, as a means to bring life and abundance to a people and a region. With Heavyweight Dub Champion, we focus our musical energies on bringing life and abundance to the human spirit from within ... The power of music can generate real momentum that leads to action in all sorts of ways and contributing our musical energy and experience to the "Water of Life" is just a very small step towards using it as a positive Earth-changing force." In 2011, dubstep artist Liquid Stranger released two Heavyweight Dub Champion collaborations on his Interchill release "Arcane Terrain". In 2011, Resurrector did an all analog "redub" of Kraddy's "Into The Labyrinth" EP released in 2013.

Dr. Israel performing with HDC at Furia Sound Festival 2007, France

== Live performances ==
HDC has gained notoriety by appearing in prime slots in prominent West Coast Festivals including Reggae Rising, Lightning In A Bottle Festival, Monterey Bay Reggae Festival, Joshua Tree Music Festival, EmergNsee Festival, Earthdance Festival, Symbiosis Gathering, Stilldream Festival, Raggamuffins Festival Shambhala Music Festival, Summer Circus, Harmony Festival/Techno Tribal, and the Headline slot in 2006 at Reggae On The River. In addition, 2007 brought HDC to some of Europe's better known festivals as well including Eurockeennes and Furia Sound Festival in France and Fusion Festival in Germany. Their live performance is often referred to as The Liberation Process ... in the words of Marquee Mag, "Using complex musical alchemy, the core members ... aim to liberate the human race completely through the power of sound vibration."

The performance itself consists of some live music elements combined with pre recorded instruments and sequences generated exclusively at HDC's own Champion Nation Studios. HDC prides itself in incorporating originally recorded material only and uses over 50 instruments when laying foundation for album and live material. They have stated that the intention is to bring people into a trance-like state that resembles a "de-zombification process that will, according to Resurrector, 'create a space for a new sort of psychology that will welcome helpful spirits that will, if you call them, come to assist you'". They have titled some of their live performances Operation Raise The Dead. "It's more about raising the walking dead than raising specifically dead people from their graves," says Resurrector. Described by Festival Preview magazine, Heavyweight Dub Champion "blend dub, dancehall, hip hop and throbbing electronics together into an intense dancefloor beast." In a recent show with Tricky, 944 magazine described HDC's performance as "a dark, throbbing, harmonic geniusly live mixed set consisting of a wide range of instruments and equipment generating an eclectic electronic sound like I have never heard. The bass in the front row was almost enough to make your heart skip a beat, yet alone hold a camera steady."

We don't consider what we're doing entertaining. Society has defined what entertainment is, and that's not what we're doing. We want to break down the performer/observer barrier.

— Resurrector

== Ideology ==
Central to the core of Heavyweight Dub Champion is a pseudo-mythological science fiction style ideological foundation. As defined by the band, "Heavyweight Dub Champion is a movement of interdimensional Warriors representing the Army of the Last Champion." They use catch phrases like "where ancient ritual meets modern technology", "the liberation process is in full effect" and "Champion Nation Revolution" on posters, banners and descriptions. Their mission statement is defined as The Unconditional Liberation of the Human Race. Each studio album follows a loose story line about Warrior conquest and a battle against the "rulers of the planet." The Heavyweight Dub Champion hero is a spirit consciousness called "the Last Champion." The antihero, "Villain", is an infiltrator character mostly only referred to through ethereal waki taki jabber in the background, but Emcee Vill also appears as a vocal guest often alluding to or expressing his plight. Many of the other characters who appear as themselves through the course of the albums represent different fundamental philosophies presented in the Last Champion Manifesto.

=== Last Champion Manifesto ===
Included in the CD package for Survival Guide is the mysterious and band defining booklet Last Champion Manifesto. The liner notes specify "text and composition by Resurrector", which would lead one to assume that it was indeed written by him. Reviewers and interviewers have referred to the work with various degrees of both interest and disdain. The LA Weekly calls it a "bible/babble manifesto", the Denver Westword refers to it as "a scripturally spirited rant" and The Source Weekly labels it as, "steeped in allegory and at times reading like ancient scripture". It is a 70-page bound book presented in seven sections divided into chapters named after songs from both Survival Guide and Rise, as well as some presumed to be as yet unreleased. The booklet is written about the development of the Warrior consciousness, a trend presented throughout the HDC experience. "We use the symbolism of an army and a gathering of soldiers," says Resurrector. "There are ways that you can generate, create and prepare for a life focused on trying to elevate consciousness and liberate people – and to combat the progression of a society that, we believe, generates closed-minded educational frameworks that don't allow for people to explore their own power and creative tendencies."

The chapters of the booklet refer to various aspects of clearing space and redefining perception. Removing mental and spiritual pollution is presented as an essential part of the process (the liberation process) of unifying with the consciousness of the "Last Champion." Those who believe and follow this process are referred to as members of the "Last Champion's Chosen Army." It stated that people are not chosen to be in this Army, they choose to do so by uniting with the fundamental goals and ideology. They call this global unification of Warriors the "Champion Nation", which is also the name of their Record Label.

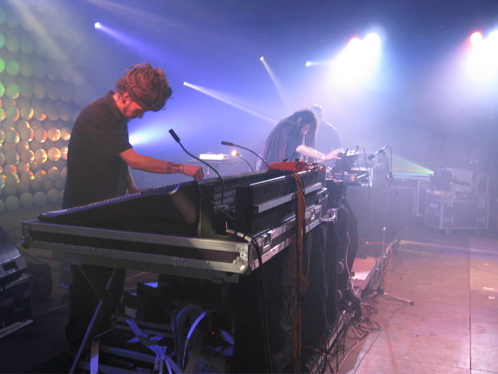
Heavyweight Dub Champion performing at Eurockeennes Festival, France 2007

=== Sonic Shamanistic Alchemy ===
The foundation of the band's musical presentation is a method they call "Sonic Shamanistic Alchemy". The instrumental members of the band are often referred to as "Sonic Shamanistic Alchemists". As defined by Resurrector, it involves, "taking a range of vibrational materials, from tribal instruments to electronic instruments, and manipulating them through devices like tape delays and old analog stomp boxes to try to find the personality of each piece ... looking for particular voices, particular vibrations that would contribute to the spectrum of sound we're trying to bring forth, a spectrum of liberational revolutionary energy ... to change the chemistry of the planet leading to unconditional liberation of the human race."

== Other projects ==
All the members and affiliates of Heavyweight Dub Champion are active in other music projects. Resurrector rebranded his project Liberation Movement in 2010 and has since been performing in the US, Canada, Peru and Costa Rica. He recorded and produced the album Onáyabaon Bewá – Messages from Mother Earth' by Shamans of the Temple of the Way of Light in 2011. Patch has resigned himself from being involved in some HDC gigs to focus on a solo career and has been flourishing with his acoustic guitar company Wide Sky Guitars. A.P.O.S.T.L.E. released his fourth solo album, Lyrical Activism in 2008 and has been touring with DJ Quest. He has mostly reinvented his career as a playwright and actor under his birth name Jeff Campbell. Dr. Israel has been involved in many projects over the years and in 2007 experienced international success with his album, Dreadtone International – Patterns of War. He is currently working on album projects with Bill Laswell, Dr. Know of Bad Brains and Mad Professor. Stero-Lion released his first solo effort, Lion Paw in 2008.

== Discography ==
- "Whirlwinds Of Revolt" – Voodoo, Sacraments, Oddities and Other Holy Anthems. (1998). Reggae On The Rocks Compilation. What Are Records?
- Survival Guide For The End Of Time. (2002). Champion Nation Recordings
- "Arrival" – Bassnectar Remix (2006 & 2008). Bassnectar. Om Records & Organic Records
- "Snared" – Freq Nasty vs. Heavyweight Dub Champion. (2008). Give Back Compilation
- Rise Of The Champion Nation – Limited Edition. (2008). Champion Nation Recordings
- Rise Of The Champion Nation. (2009). Champion Nation Recordings & MVD Distribution
- "Rise" - Liquid Stranger and Heavyweight Dub Champion.(2011).Interchill
- "Babylon Beast" - Liquid Stranger and Heavyweight Dub Champion. (2011). Interchill
- "Babylon Beast(feat. Killah Priest)" - In Defense: A Benefit for the Civil Liberties Defense Center, Vol. 1. Compilation. (2010). Autonomous Music
- Labyrinth in Dub - EP - Kraddy & Heavyweight Dub Champion. (2013). Minotaur
- "Praise The Father" - The Bloom Series Vol. 3: Ways of the Sacred Pt.2. 2013. Muti Music
