= Donald Schultz =

South African film maker, writer and entertainer

- Occupations: film maker; writer; entertainer

Donald Schultz is a South African film maker, writer and entertainer who works with dangerous species.

== Career ==
Schultz appeared on Wild Recon under the title "Venom Hunter."

He was also featured in Venom in Vegas, where he performed in a glass box containing 100 snakes, some venomous. Schultz has been the guest on Chelsea Lately where he introduced Chelsea to animals.

He has appeared on the Jason Ellis Show on Sirius/XM to discuss Extreme Falling, Animals and tribal rituals.
