= SORNE =

American singer-songwriter

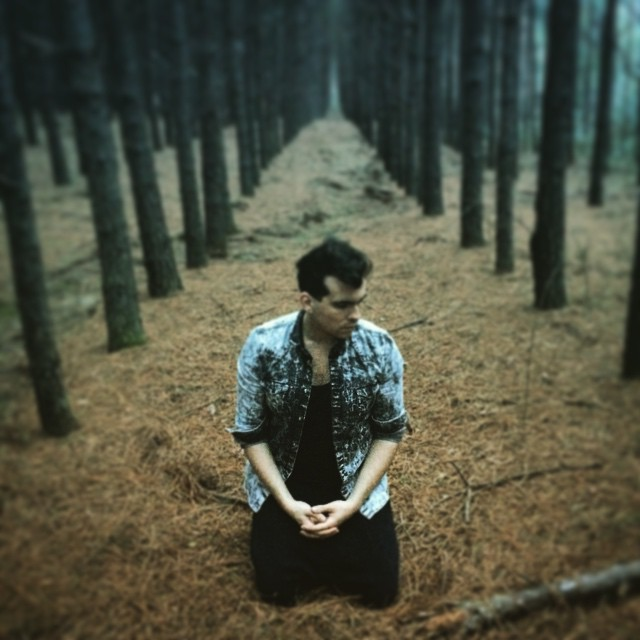
- SORNE in his hometown, Tallahassee, Florida, January 1, 2015
- Born: Morgan Sorne; July 24, 1983 (age 43); Tallahassee, Florida
- Education: Florida State University
- Occupations: singer-songwriter; multi-media artist
- Website: sorne.com

Morgan Sorne (born July 24, 1983), known in his solo music project as SORNE, is an American singer-songwriter, composer, multi-media artist, music producer, and actor based in Los Angeles, California. His musical style has been described tribal, electronica, avant-garde, avant pop, alternative rock, and electro-space-folk. Though sometimes associated with the broad genre of rock, his songs feature no electric guitars, conventional bass instruments, or conventional drum sets. His music uses layered vocal samples and unconventional (mostly hand-made) instrumentation. He was a Texas Biennial artist in 2009, and in 2013 won the Austin Chronicle 2013 Avant Garde Artist of the Year award.

== Biography ==
Morgan Sorne was born in Tallahassee, Florida in July 1983. He was raised in a Christian setting but does not consider himself to be religious. According to an interview with Sorne in OVERLD, his mother, an opera singer, had a voice teacher who noticed that when he was two years old, Sorne had perfect pitch. As a young child, he was enrolled in a music class but he hated it and threw a maraca at another child. He never continued any sort of formal music education. He did do stage acting, including musical theatre. He also studied the visual arts and received a Bachelor of Fine Arts in Studio Art from Florida State University which he attended from 2002 to 2004.

Sorne moved to Texas in 2007 to paint, compose, and collaborate with other artists. He became recognized in Austin for his visual art and was a Texas Biennial artist in 2009. Before joining with his bandmates and developing his current stage show, he began his live musical performances by "setting up installations in galleries, doing drawings, and singing and building a vocal landscape – adaptations of songs, motifs out of songs – letting those things just fill a room." His short film, SORNE: Children of the Black Mountain, premiered at the SXSW film festival in 2012. In 2013, he won the Austin Chronicle 2013 Avant Garde Artist of the Year award.

== In performance ==
SORNE performs and tours with a revolving cast of dancers, musicians and artists. They appeared at the 2012 Utopiafest in Texas and toured the US in November of that year. Live shows consist of primarily live vocals, sampled vocals and other pre-recorded sounds, live drums, and occasionally incorporate other instruments as well. SORNE has been described as seeming as though he is in a trance in his live performance. He describes the early development of his live act, before teaming up with the other bandmates, as "setting up installations in galleries, doing drawings, and singing and building a vocal landscape – adaptations of songs, motifs out of songs – letting those things just fill a room." His stage performances often feature an array of the visual art he has made for the House of Stone Saga. Some performances have featured live choreographed dance through collaboration with the dance group Woven Feet.

SORNE is known for the use of only the voice, homemade instruments and found objects. in his recordings. The musical style has been described tribal, electronica, avant-garde, avant pop, alternative rock, and electro-space-folk. In addition to the "tribal" description, some of his music has been specifically interpreted as having a Native American sound. Sorne has replied to this interpretation, "I'm not taking specific pieces from a Native American rain dance and reappropriating that for my own means. I'm creating my own work. And if that speaks to those things, then that's fine, because it speaks to that underlying current of humanity that exists in all of us. It's interesting because I never really had the intention of creating something that was 'tribal'. That primitive element there speaks to almost a childlike desire to create our own culture. The outfits that you see on the kids on that album were inspired by a bunch of little girls that I know."

SORNE has been noted for his wide vocal range. The singers to whom his voice has been compared include Jeff Buckley. In addition to a wide range of pitches, he is able to produce a wide variety of timbres with his voice.

== House of Stone saga ==
SORNE has written over 80 songs which tell the story of the House of Stone saga through the points of view of the five main characters: First Born, Second Sun, Black Sister, Little Brother, and Blue Sister. House of Stone is the name of both the entire saga and the first album, which was released in 2011 and featured 13 songs written by Sorne including "Golden Death Chant". Speaking on the origins of the House of Stone saga, SORNE has said, "I guess it started with a series of short stories that I wrote when I was 17 or 18 years old. These stories were based on family members. I always felt drawn to finding a harmony between storytelling, music, art, and performance." The saga is told through multiple media in addition to the songs: images illustrating the characters and important symbols from the story, written descriptions of the characters, music videos depicting the characters and moments from the story, and a short film, SORNE: Children of the Black Mountain, which premiered at the SXSW film festival in 2012.

== Discography ==
=== Albums ===
- House of Stone (2011)
- House of Stone: Death I (2014)
- House of Stone: Death II (2014)
- House of Stone: Death III (2015)
- House of Stone: Death IIII (2016)
- House of Stone: Death V (2017)

=== Singles ===
- Ego Altar (2013)

=== Guest appearances ===
- A Thousand Faces-Act I: Beats Antique (2013)
- A Thousand Faces-Act II: Beats Antique (2014)
