= MarchFourth Marching Band =

American musical and performance group

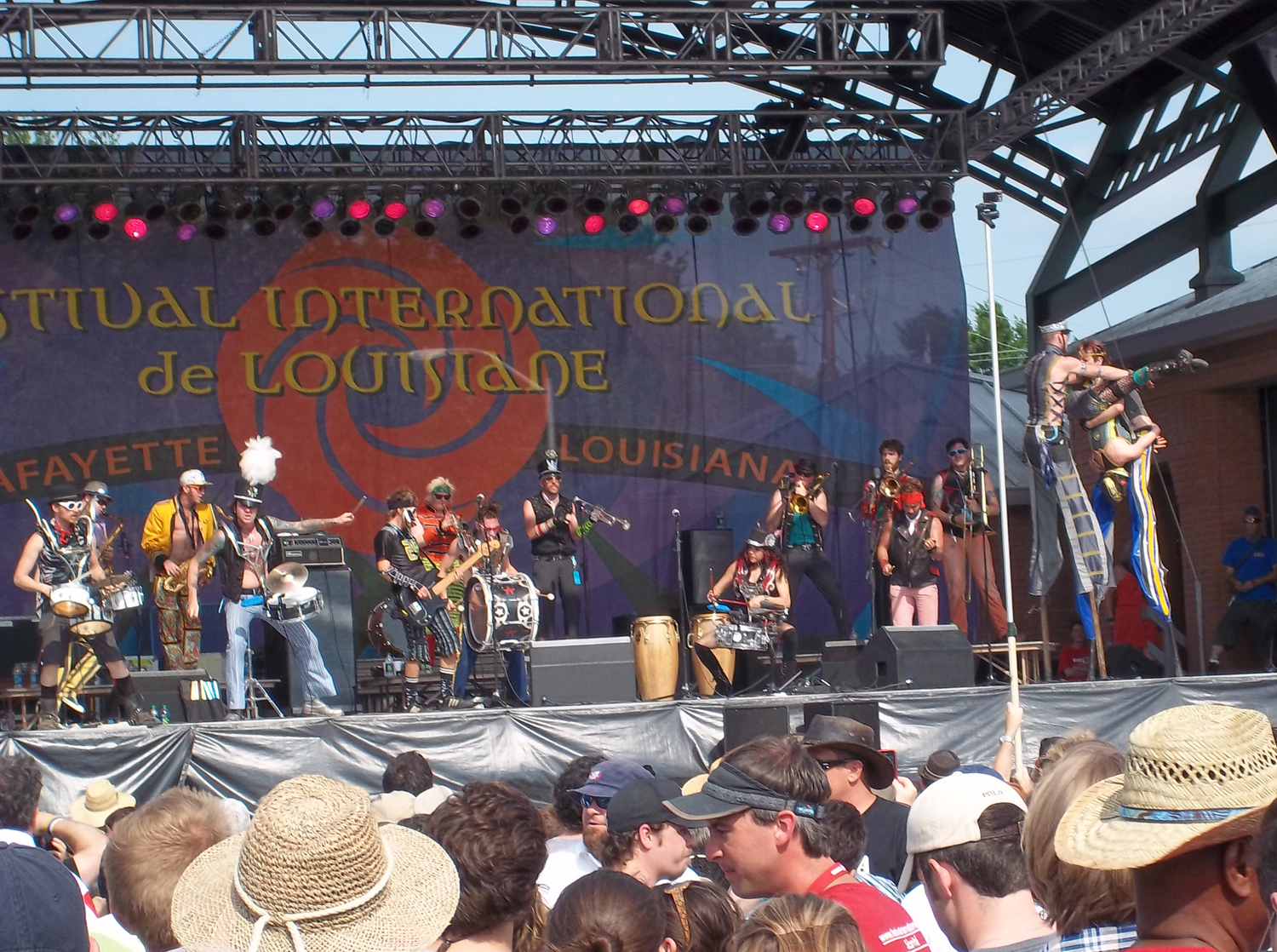
- Playing at the Festival International in Lafayette, Louisiana spring 2011

Background information
- Also known as: M4
- Origin: Portland, Oregon, United States
- Genres: Rock, Funk, World
- Years active: 2003–present
- Website: marchfourthmarchingband.com

MarchFourth Marching Band (now known as MarchFourth, or M4 for short) is an American musical and performance group based in Portland, Oregon. Costumed as a "psychedelic punk rock marching band circus troupe," M4’s show features electric bass, guitar, a 4-piece percussion corps, a 7-part horn section, dancers, acrobatics, stilt-walkers, a live visual artist, and a diverse musical repertoire. They combine their musical performance with a visual performance by stiltwalkers, acrobatics and hooping. The band has toured Germany, The Netherlands, France, British Columbia, China and the United States. MarchFourth performs mostly original works and occasional cover songs. The name derives from the date of the band's creation, March 4, 2003, Fat Tuesday. Within two months of their first show, the local press had already coined a new nickname for the act: M4.

MarchFourth consists of a horn section (trombones, trumpets, saxophones), a percussion section, electric bass guitar, and electric guitar as well as stiltwalkers, acrobats and dancers. The band members' uniforms are mismatched, and are often redesigned traditional marching band uniforms. The percussion section's drum harnesses are made from recycled bicycle parts.

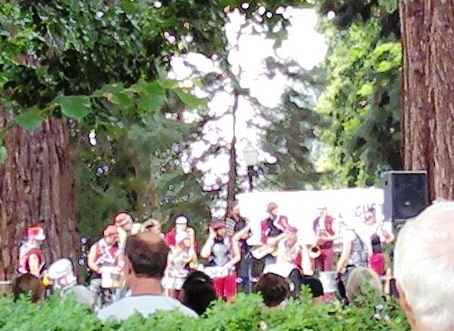
The band in 2009 in Hillsboro, Oregon

MarchFourth's music retains influences from rock, ska, jazz, klezmer, hip hop, and swing styles of music, among others.

MarchFourth Marching Band was voted "Best Local Band" in 2004 by readers of Willamette Week alternative weekly newspaper and the August 2007 issue of Travel + Leisure magazine featured MarchFourth Marching Band in an article about Portland. MarchFourth performed as the opening act for No Doubt, and lead singer Gwen Stefani has featured a marching band in her solo albums.

They have performed with OK Go, Fleetwood Mac, No Doubt, Kiss, Blink 182, Balkan Beat Box, Galactic, Rebirth Brass Band, Beats Antique, The Neville Brothers, Antibalas and Pink Martini. MarchFourth has had wide appeal at a variety of music festivals such as SXSW, Jam Cruise, Burning Man, Bumbershoot, Wakarusa Music and Camping Festival, Waterfront Blues Festival, Voodoo Experience, High Sierra Music Festival, FloydFest, Telluride Jazz Celebration, Hardly Strictly Bluegrass, Festival International de Louisiane, Lotus World Music and Arts Festival, Sioux Falls JazzFest and Oregon Country Fair.

MarchFourth was the marching band featured in an online advertisement for the short-lived Microsoft Kin smartphone.

Their 2011 album, Magnificent Beast, was produced by Steve Berlin, the saxophone player for Los Lobos. Berlin also produced their 2013 single "Shindig," which was also featured in the band's Shindig music video.

MarchFourth Marching Band's successful Kickstarter campaign raised nearly $50,000 from fans to buy a tour bus.

In 2013, the song "Gospel," taken from MarchFourth's Rise Up album, was featured in the Disney/Pixar film Monsters University. The song played twice during the film and during the film's closing credits and was also used in the official trailer for the film.

MarchFourth Marching Band is booked by Skyline Music. On September 30, 2016, the album Magic Number became the band's first album to be released on the music streaming platform Spotify.

== Discography ==
- MarchFourth Marching Band - 2005
- Live - 2007
- Rise Up - 2009
- Magnificent Beast - 2011
- Magic Number - 2016
- Worth It (EP) - 2023
