= Symbiosis Gathering =

Music and art festival

Symbiosis Gathering is an expressive arts, music, and community event based on transformational development, notable for its international festival collaborations and lack of corporate sponsorship.

International collaborative partners include Rainbow Serpent in Australia, Mother in Japan, and Glade Festival in England. Symbiosis Gathering has been called an "adult-Disneyland", Neverland, and compared to Burning Man, Lightning in a Bottle, Boom Festival, and Rainbow Serpent Festival.

The 2017 Symbiosis Gathering in Oregon was aligned with the total solar eclipse on August 21, garnering attention as "the most transcendental event in the known universe".

== History ==
Symbiosis Gathering was first held at Cutter Scout Camp near the Santa Cruz mountains in 2005, for a crowd of around 800 people and it grew to over 15,000 for the 10 year anniversary in September 2015. The Gathering has been held in a variety of locations including Angels Camp in 2006 and 2007, Camp Mather near Yosemite National Park in 2009, at Pyramid Lake during an annular solar eclipse in May 2012, and Woodward Reservoir in Oakdale, CA. From 2013 to 2016, Symbiosis Gathering was held on the 2900-acre Woodward Reservoir and has been called the "MVP", a "true gem" and "the most unique aspect". The event is held on a "five-nubbed" peninsula and has open swimming throughout the weekend. The festival also boasts the most evolved demonstration of Art Boats, which has likely come from the influence of nearby DIY events Burning Man and Maker Faire. Called the "jewel of Symbiosis' production" was the "Swimbiosis" stage which saw the sound system pointed out on the water where the dancefloor extended to thousands of people on rafts, makeshift boats, and swimming in the reservoir.

== 2017 total solar eclipse ==
The 2017 edition was aligned with the solar eclipse of August 21, 2017 which was the first total solar eclipse seen in the continental U.S. since 1979. The festival was a collaboration between numerous international producers including Bass Coast (CAN), Beloved (US), Envision Festival (CR), Hadra (FR), Noisily (UK), Ometeotl (MX), Origin Festival (SA), Rainbow Serpent (AUS), Re:Birth (JPN), Sonic Bloom (US), and Universo Paralello (BR). The event was held with seven music stages and over 40 different areas of workshops, large art sculptures, and other displays, which was planned for over 30,000 people. Oregon Eclipse offered a special ticket exclusively for purchase with digital currency such as Bitcoin.

== Ethos ==
The mission statement of Symbiosis declares that the Gathering is a music, art, and conscious lifestyle event and has consistent messaging about community. There are strong participatory elements in many aspects including participants bringing their own art, live painting both on and off stage, and installations that one can touch and climb. Co-founder Bosque Hrbek calls Symbiosis a "collaborative experiment" and prefers the description of an "international gathering" as staff includes teams of people who also work on international events such as Rainbow Serpent Festival, Boom Festival, and Brazil's Universo Paralello among others. The producers calling the event a Gathering rather than a festival with the intention that the true value of the event is in people coming together. The theme to the 2016 edition is Family Tree, where families are encouraged to bring children to participate in a kids village throughout the event.

Symbiosis is known for "embodying an ethos of creativity, sustainability and experimentation through its vibrant art installations, esoteric lineup and infectious vibes" as well as having a lineup of live and electronic, downtempo, trance, and world music as well as permaculture, sustainability, kirtan, and yoga workshops. Symbiosis Gathering includes an ecological component that encourages sustainable lifestyle choices and to leave places in better condition than when they arrived. Symbiosis has hosted multi-day immersives in 2006, 2007, 2013, 2015, and 2016 focusing on sustainability, yoga, visionary art, permaculture, and indigenous wisdom. The producers have positioned three events to coincide with solar eclipses, including the event in Oregon during the total solar eclipse on August 21, 2017.

Many performance troupes can be found integrated with the programming including the producers of the Edwardian Ball, Bay Area's Vau de Vire Society, and Lucent Dossier Experience, among others. Organizers have no screens or projections at the event instead relying on lighting and structure for ambience to create more participating and less observing. The event has no corporate sponsorship, an aspect which is shared by only Burning Man in gatherings of substantial size.

== Music ==
The music selection of Symbiosis has been called eclectic, diverse, quirky, obscure, and underground including live bands such as CocoRosie, Les Claypool, and STS9 among others. The lineup also has an electronic bent with techno and house, with psytrance, downtempo, dubstep, as well as more analog gypsy and quirky performances. The 2015 edition was lauded to have "acoustic based musicians, female musicians, butoh artists, and many other cutting edge experimental visual and sonic performance artist that are breaking ground" at the time. Symbiosis also has a number of US debuts, unannounced, and surprise performances including edIT and Ooah from The Glitch Mob performing as "Crying over Porcelain for No Reason" which to date had only happened in '09 and '15 both at Symbiosis Gathering.

== Art ==
The art of Symbiosis has been called trippy, otherworldly, mind-blowing and lauded by many as an essential aspect of the experience. Structures that have been erected at Burning Man have often found their way to Symbiosis due to the relative proximity of time and location between the two events. Sculpture and installation artists such as Gerard Minakawa of Bamboo DNA, Michael Christian, Hybycozo, Shrine, and Bryan Tedrick are a few of the artists who have built major installations at the events. The stages are also built more as artistic creations than truss structures to hold rock bands. Each stage is created to have its own unique aesthetic which leads to numerous different environments throughout the festival.

== Workshops ==
Symbiosis Gathering includes a significant educational and betterment of self component with workshops and presentations of all sorts. Past speakers include Vandana Shiva, Democracy Now! Amy Goodman, actor/poet/activist Saul Williams, culture jamming activists The Yes Men, and The Tao of Physics author Fritjof Capra among others. Symbiosis takes an eco-friendly approach in its offerings by not selling plastic water bottles and bags, and instead sells only reusable and recyclable products. In 2007 they started a dishwashing program that significantly reduced waste.
