= Özdemir =

Özdemir is both a Turkish masculine given name and a surname meaning "pure iron." Notable people with the name include:

== Given name ==
- Özdemir Asaf (1923–1981), Turkish poet and writer
- Özdemir Bayraktar (1949–2021), Turkish entrepreneur and engineer
- Özdemir Erdoğan (born 1940), Turkish musician
- Özdemir Pasha (died 1561), Circassian Mamluk general for the Ottoman Empire
- Özdemir Sabancı (1941–1996), Turkish businessman
- Ozdemir Turan (born 1950), Turkish acrobat

== Surname ==
- Abdulkadir Özdemir (born 1991), Turkish footballer
- Ali Özdemir (1923–2009), Turkish wrestler
- Ali Talip Özdemir (born 1953), Turkish politician and former leader of the Motherland Party
- Bayram Özdemir (born 1976), Turkish wrestler
- Berat Özdemir (born 1998), Turkish footballer
- Bestemsu Özdemir (born 1992), Turkish actress
- Burak Özdemir (born 1994), Turkish chef and restaurateur
- Cansu Özdemir (born 1988), German politician of Kurdish descent
- Cem Özdemir (born 1965), German politician of Turkish descent
- Cem Özdemir (born 1992), Turkish footballer
- Cüneyt Özdemir (born 1970), Turkish journalist
- Demet Özdemir (born 1992), Turkish actress, dancer and model
- Ela Naz Özdemir (born 2006), Turkish female swimmer
- Emre Ozdemir (born 1981), Turkish cartoonist and illustrator
- Enes Özdemir (born 2002), Turkish karateka
- Engin Özdemir (born 1968), Turkish footballer
- Evren Ozdemir (born 1977, Turkish-Canadian rapper, producer and songwriter
- Gülper Özdemir (born 1994), Turkish actress
- Halil Özdemir (born 2005), Turkish footballer
- Hasan Özdemir (born 1947), Turkish former police chief and politician
- Hasan Özdemir (born 1964), Turkish footballer
- İbrahim Özdemir (born 1960), Turkish philosopher
- İlkay Özdemir (born 1981), Turkish female performer of stage magic
- Kaan Özdemir (born 1998), Turkish footballer
- Kayra Özdemir (born 1988), Turkish-French judoka
- Mahinur Ozdemir (born 1982), Belgian politician
- Mahmut Özdemir (born 1987), German politician of Turkish descent
- Muzaffer Özdemir (born 1955), Turkish actor
- Nihat Özdemir (born 1950), Turkish businessman
- Nilay Özdemir (born 1985), Turkish female volleyball player
- Nimet Özdemir (born 1970), Turkish entrepreneur and politician
- Oktay Özdemir (born 1986), Turkish-German actor
- Orkun Özdemir (born 1995), Turkish footballer
- Osman Özdemir (born 1961), Turkish football player and manager
- Özer Özdemir (born 1998), Turkish footballer
- Özgür Özdemir (born 1995), Turkish footballer
- Pervin Özdemir (born 1951), Turkish female ceramics artist
- Pınar Özdemir (born ----) Miss Turkey winner in 1991.
- Şaban Özdemir (born 1981), Turkish journalist and TV producer
- Samuel Ozdemir (born 1942), Turkish-Belgian prelate
- Serkan Özdemir (born 1976), Turkish football player
- Seçkin Özdemir (born 1981), Turkish actor and former TV presenter, radio personality, and disc jockey (DJ)
- Şenay Özdemir (born 1969), Turkish-Dutch television presenter, journalist, and women's rights activist
- Turan Özdemir (1952–2018), Turkish actor and voice actor
- Volkan Oezdemir (born 1989), Turkish-Swiss MMA artist
- Yasemin Özdemir (born 1965), Turkish doctor
- Yusuf Özdemir (born 2001), Turkish footballer

== Places ==
- Özdemir, Elmalı, a village in the Elmalı district of the Antalya Province of Turkey
- Panik, Turkey, a town in the Iğdır Merkez district of the Iğdır Province of Turkey, known as Özdemir before 2014
