= Bali (name) =

Bali is a name, which may refer to:

== Given name ==
- Bali Ram Bhagat (1922–2011), Indian politician
- Bali Rai (born 1971), English author
- Malkoçoğlu Bali Bey (1495–1548), Ottoman military commander

== Surname ==
- Arun Bali (1942–2022), Indian actor
- Domkat Bali (1940–2020), Nigerian retired Army general and politician
- G. S. Bali (1954–2021), Indian politician
- Geeta Bali (1930–1965), Bollywood actress
- Hanif Bali (born 1987), Swedish politician
- Meghna Bali, Australian journalist
- Mekayla Bali (born 1999), a Canadian missing person
- Nimai Bali (born 1969), Indian actor
- Péter Bali (born 1984), is a Hungarian football player
- Rajeshwar Bali (1889–1944), Indian monarch
- Rıfat Bali (born 1948), Turkish historian
- Rowena Bali (born 1977), Mexican writer
- Sacha Bali, Brazilian actor
- Suchindra Bali (born 1976), Tamil actor
- Turan G. Bali, American economist
- Yogeeta Bali (born 1952), a Hindi actress

== Other ==
- Ibrahim ibn Bali, 15th-century Mamluk official and writer
