= Turan (name) =

Turan is a Turkish given name and surname. It may refer to:

== Given name ==
- Turan (mythology), in Etruscan mythology, the goddess of love and vitality and patroness of Vulci
- Turan-Shah (died 1180), Ayyubid prince (emir) of Yemen, Baalbek, Damascus, Alexandria
- Turan Akalın (born 1984), Turkish wheelchair tennis player and wheelchair curler
- Turan Amirsoleimani (1905–1994), Iranian royal
- Turan Bağmanov (born 2000), Azerbaijani musician
- Turan G. Bali, Turkish-American economist
- Turan Bayramov (born 2001), Azerbaijani wrestler
- Turan Ceylan (born 1968), Turkish wrestler
- Turan Dursun (1934–1990), Turkish mufti
- Turan Emeksiz (1940–1960), Turkish university student
- Turan Güneş (politician) (1922–1982), Turkish politician
- Turan Kışlakçı (born 1973), Turkish journalist
- Turan Manafov (born 1998), Azerbaijani footballer
- Turan Manafzade (born 1991), Azerbaijani musician
- Turan Mehrzad (1930–2023), Iranian actress
- Turan Mirzayev (born 1979), Azerbaijani weightlifter
- Turan Özdemir (1952–2018), Turkish actor and voice actor
- Turan Sofuoğlu (born 1965), Turkish footballer

== Surname ==
- Ali Turan (born 1983), Turkish soccer player
- Arda Turan (born 1987), Turkish footballer
- Atila Turan (born 1992), Turkish-French footballer
- Ayça Ayşin Turan (born 1992), Turkish actress
- Bülent Turan (born 1975), Turkish politician
- Cemil Turan (born 1947), Turkish footballer
- Ekin Tunçay Turan, Turkish stage actress and translator
- Emre Turan (born 1990), Turkish soccer player
- Esin Turan (born 1970), Austrian-Turkish painter and sculptor
- Fatih Turan (born 1993), Turkish footballer
- Frigyes Turán (born 1974), Hungarian rally driver
- Gülistan Turan (born 1997), Turkish female Muay Thai practitioner
- Güven Turan (born 1943), Turkish poet and writer
- Hakan Turan (born 1992), Turkish soccer player
- Hasan Turan (born 1962), Iraqi politician
- Hasan Turan (born 1967), Turkish politician
- İlter Turan (born 1941), Turkish academic
- Kenan Dünnwald-Turan (born 1995), Turkish-German footballer
- Kenneth Turan (born 1946), American film critic
- Mehmet Cahit Turan (born 1960), Turkish civil engineer, civil servant and former government minister
- Murat Turan (born 1975), Turkish para archer
- Nesim Turan (born 1992), Turkish Paralympic table tennis player
- Nuri Turan (1924–2016), Turkish athlete
- Özdemir Turan (born 1950), Turkish acrobat
- Pál Turán (1910–1976), Hungarian mathematician
- Sali Turan (born 1949), Turkish painter
- Sefer Turan (born 1962), Turkish journalist
- Veysel Turan (1901–2007), Turkish veteran of the Turkish War of Independence

== See also ==
- Turan (disambiguation)
- Turan-Mirza Kamal (1951–2004), American musician
