= Şenay =

Şenay is a feminine Turkish given name. Notable people with the name include:

- Şenay Duzcu, Turkish-German stand-up comedian
- Şenay Gürler (born 1966), Turkish actress
- Şenay Özdemir (born 1969), Turkish-Dutch television presenter, journalist and women's rights activist
- Şenay Yüzbaşıoğlu (1951–2013), Turkish singer, aka Şenay
