= Parveen =

Parveen (Persian: پروین) is a Persian-Kurdish given name meaning Pleiades. It is commonly used in Iran, Afghanistan, Tajikistan, Pakistan and India. It is also used as a last name.

Spellings and / or transcriptions might differ depending on the country: Parvin, Perveen, Pervin or Parween.

== Given name ==
=== Females ===
- Parvin Ahmadinejad (born 1962), Iranian politician
- Parvin Ardalan (born 1967), Iranian women's rights activist, writer and journalist
- Parveen Babi (1954 –2005), Indian actress
- Pervin Buldan (born 1967), Turkish politician
- Parvin Darabi (born 1941), Iranian born American activist, writer and defender of women's rights
- Parvin Dowlatabadi (1924–2008), Iranian children's author and poet
- Parvin E'tesami (1907–1941), Iranian poet
- Parween Hayat, Pakistani politician
- Parveen Atif (1935–2018), Pakistani Urdu fiction writer, short story writer, columnist, and a pioneer of women's field hockey
- Shama Parveen Magsi (born 1950), politician from Balochistan province of Pakistan
- Pervin Özdemir (born 1951), Turkish ceramic artist
- Parween Pazhwak (born 1967), Afghan artist and poet and writer in the Persian language
- Parveen Shakir (1952–1994) Pakistani Urdu poet, teacher and civil servant
- Parvin Soleimani (1922–2009), Iranian actress of theater and cinema
- Parveen Sultana (born 1950), Indian Hindustani classical singer

=== Males ===
- Parvin Dabas (born 1974), Indian actor and model
- Parvin Darabadi (1947-2017), professor at the International Relations Department, Baku State University
- Parvin Mammadov (born 1995), Azerbaijani Paralympic powerlifter

== Surname ==
- Alfred Parvin (1859–1916), English cricketer
- Ali Parvin (born 1946), Iranian football player and coach
- Farida Parveen (1954–2025), Bangladeshi singer
- Landon Parvin (born 1948), American political speechwriter
- Selina Parvin (1931–1971), Bangladeshi journalist

== Places ==
- Parvin Bridge, Lane County, Oregon, US
- Parvin State Park, New Jersey, US

== Other uses ==
- PARVA gene, encodes the protein alpha-parvin in humans
- Parvin (mango), mango

== See also ==
- Parviz, its masculine counterpart
