= Pervin =

Pervin is a given name. From the original Persian "Parvin". Notable people with the name include:

- Pervin Buldan (born 1967), Kurdish politician
- Pervin Chakar, Kurdish opera singer
- Nasreen Pervin Huq (1958-2006), Bangladeshi women's activist
- Pervin Özdemir (born 1951), Turkish ceramics artist
- Pervin Shroff (born 1955), Indian scientist
