= Rajyotsava Awards (2005) =

Awards given by the government of Karnataka, India

2005 Rajyotsava Awards
- Date: 1 November 2005
- Location: Bangalore, Karnataka
- Country: India
- Presented by: Government of Karnataka

The list of Karnataka Rajyotsava Award recipients for the year 2005 is below.

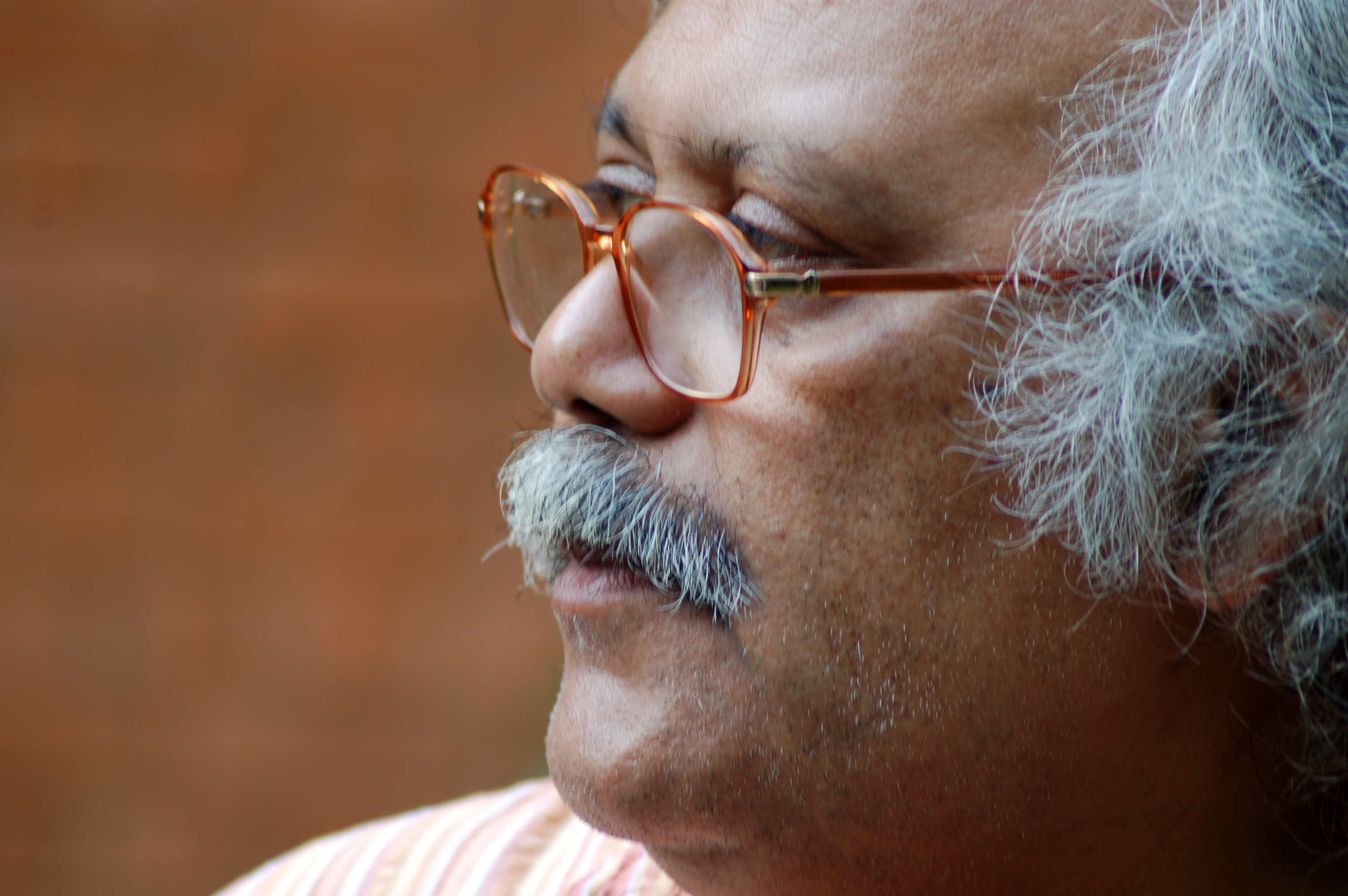
H. S. Shivaprakash

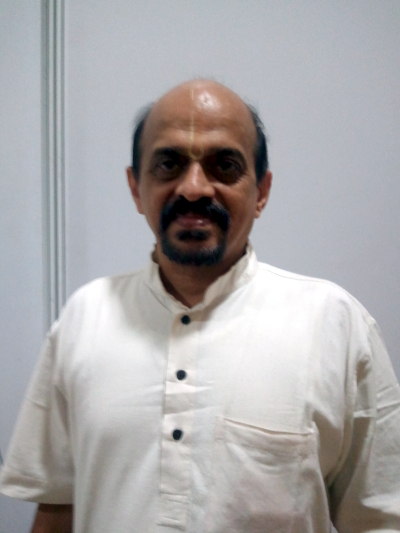
Vidyabhushana

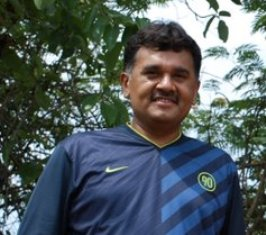
Vishweshwar Bhat

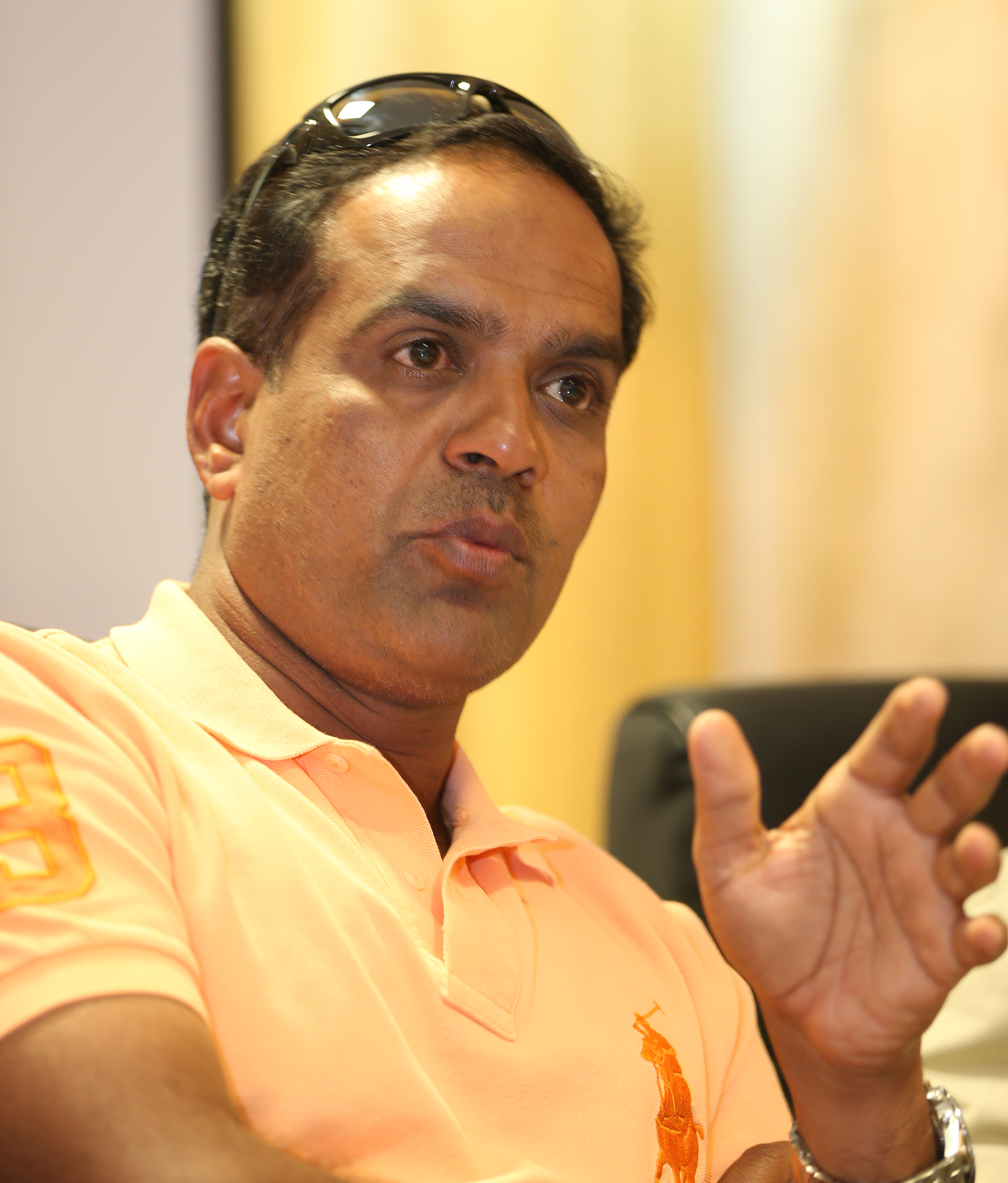
Sunil Joshi

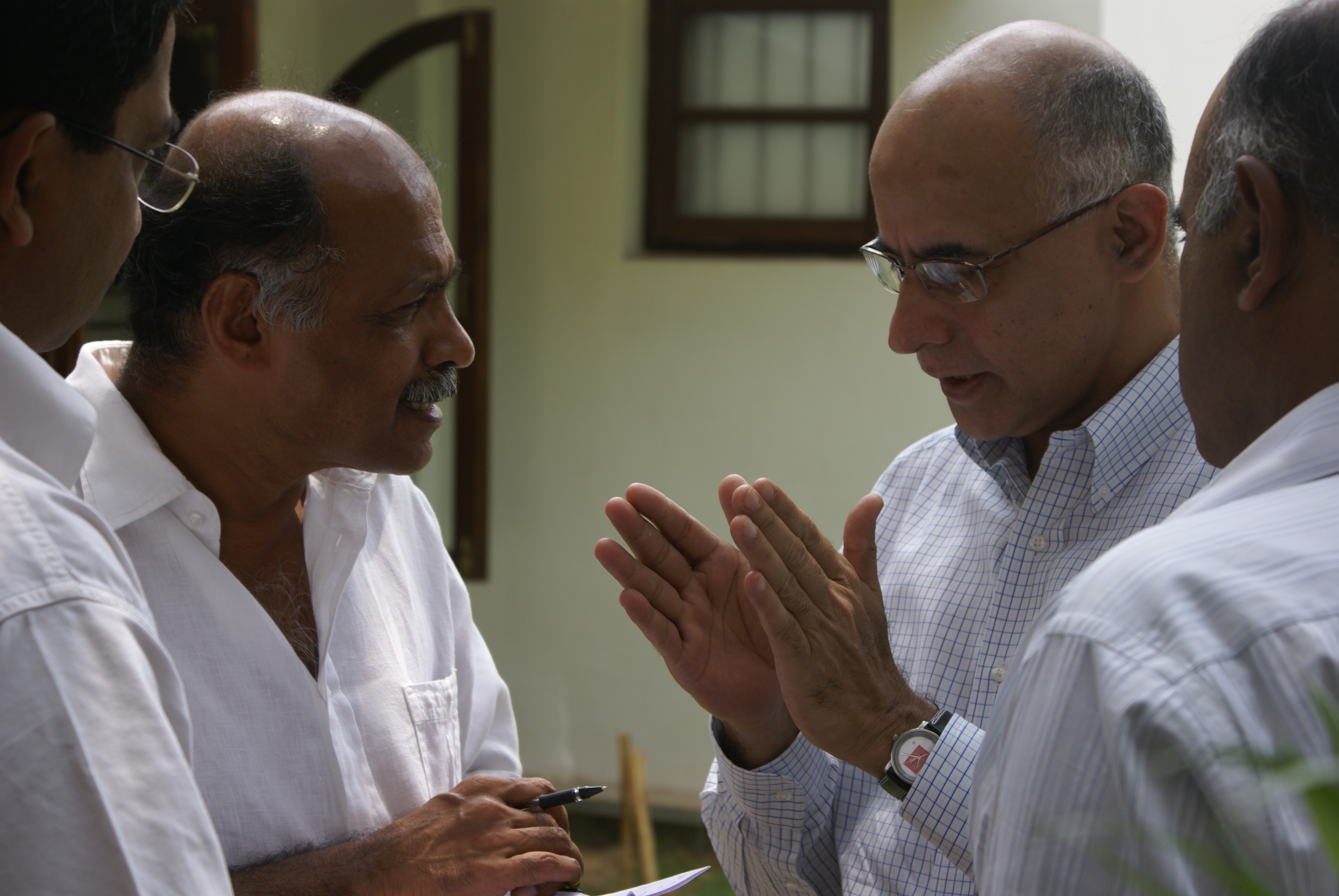
G. R. Gopinath

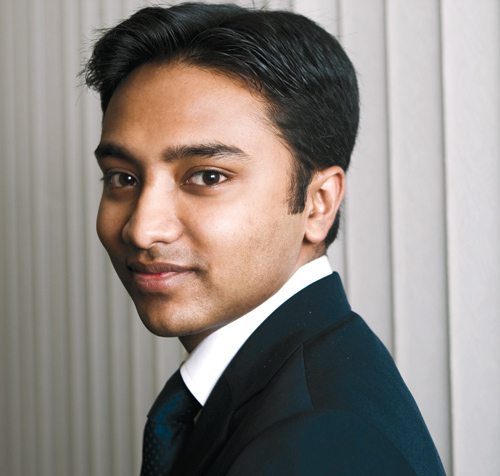
Suhas Gopinath

| Recipient | Field |
|---|---|
| Vyasaraya Ballal | Literature |
| M. H. Krishnaiah | Literature |
| Shashikala Veeraiahswamy | Literature |
| Mallepuram G. Venkatesh | Literature |
| B. L. Venu | Literature |
| H. S. Shivaprakash | Literature |
| Kotiganahalli Ramaiah | Literature |
| Krishnamurthy Hanur | Literature |
| Mahadevappa | Literature |
| B. N. Chandraiah | Literature |
| Adyanda Cariappa | Literature |
| Jaraganahalli Shivashankar | Literature |
| Mehboob Kaiser | Literature |
| Nallur Prasad | Literature |
| Madhava Gudi | Music |
| Sangameshwar Gurava | Music |
| Shivananad Tharalagatti | Music |
| R. Visweswaran | Music |
| Kurudi Venkannachar | Music |
| Sukanya Prabhakar | Music |
| Vidyabhushana | Music |
| M. Kodandarama | Music |
| Lakshman Das | Music |
| M. R. Satyanarayana | Music |
| S. Somasundaram | Music |
| Puttur Narasimha Nayak | Music |
| Veeresh Madire | Music |
| Revathi Narasimhan | Dance |
| Sudha Murty | Dance |
| R. Paramashivan | Theatre |
| Ranganayakamma | Theatre |
| Prema Badami | Theatre |
| Ananda Ganiga | Theatre |
| G. N. Deshpande | Theatre |
| M. Sampangi | Theatre |
| S. Shamurthy | Theatre |
| Lingadevaru Halemane | Theatre |
| T. R. Rajagopal | Theatre |
| Mulki Chandrasekhara Suvarna | Fine Arts |
| Khandoba | Fine Arts |
| Devadas Dattaseth | Sculpture |
| Pampanna Achar | Sculpture |
| Shankaracharya | Sculpture |
| P. K. Rajashekhar | Folklore / Yakshagana |
| Dr T B.Solabakkanavar | Folklore / Yakshagana |
| A. M. Halaiah | Folklore / Yakshagana |
| Basavalingaiah Hiremath | Folklore / Yakshagana |
| Thimmanna Ganesh Yaji | Folklore / Yakshagana |
| Rani Machaiah | Folklore / Yakshagana |
| B. K. Ramanna | Folklore / Yakshagana |
| Nallur Mariyappa Achar | Folklore / Yakshagana |
| Vasanth Narayan Rannavare | Folklore / Yakshagana |
| Mahadeva Swamy | Folklore / Yakshagana |
| Vishweshwar Bhat | Journalism |
| K. E. Eeshan | Journalism |
| Rajashekhar Koti | Journalism |
| Chidambara Chakravarthy Sheshachala | Journalism |
| Venkatesh | Journalism |
| Kanthachar | Journalism |
| Ramakrishna Upadhya | Journalism |
| Rajashekhar | Journalism |
| Garudanagiri Nagaraj | Journalism |
| T. L. Prabhakar | Journalism |
| Sunil Joshi | Sports |
| Neelamma Malligwad | Sports |
| Sripathi Shankar Kanchanal | Sports |
| D. V. Prasad | Sports |
| Pailwan Mukunda | Sports |
| Murali | Sports |
| T. N. Seetharam | Cinema |
| Rathnakar | Cinema |
| Vaishali Kasaravalli | Cinema |
| S. V. Rajendra Singh Babu | Cinema |
| Raheena Begum | Medicine |
| B. C. Bommaiah | Medicine |
| K. S. Nagesh | Medicine |
| K. Anand | Medicine |
| Sathyan Puttur | Medicine |
| C. B. Patil | Medicine |
| C. B. Sattur | Medicine |
| C. M. Gurumurthy | Medicine |
| H. S. Chandrasekharaiah | Medicine |
| B. N. Govindaraj | Medicine |
| Gopinath | Medicine |
| Jaali | Medicine |
| G. S. Moodambadithaya | Education |
| Gopal K. Kaadegoodi | Education |
| K. E. Radhakrishna | Education |
| Abraham Ebenezer | Education |
| Gunaala Kadamba | Education |
| Mariyappa Paduvala Hippige | Education |
| Chiranjeevi Singh | Administration |
| M. R. Prashanth | Social Work |
| Nirmala Gaonkar | Social Work |
| Jayadev | Social Work |
| Jayasheela Rao | Social Work |
| Mallanagowda Babagowda Patil | Social Work |
| A. Radhakrishna Raju | Social Work |
| Shivaram Moga | Social Work |
| J. D. Amaranatha Gowda | Overseas Kannadiga |
| Chandrappa Reshme | Overseas Kannadiga |
| Bhimanagowda Patil | Overseas Kannadiga |
| Udayabhanu Kala Sangha | Institution |
| Kannada Sangha, Pune | Institution |
| Rashtriya Vidyalaya | Institution |
| Sandesha | Institution |
| Manonandana | Institution |
| Anand Pandurangi | Others |
| M. Mohan Alva | Others |
| G. M. Vedeshwara | Others |
| Shankaranarayana Somayaji | Others |
| G. R. Gopinath | Others |
| H. G. Daddi | Others |
| Subraya Sharma | Others |
| Veenadhari | Others |
| S. N. Chandrasekhar | Others |
| Nirmala Kesari | Others |
| Thotendra Swamiji | Others |
| S. Raghuram | Others |
| D. K. Chowta | Others |
| Gopal Shastry | Others |
| Venkanna Bommaiah Nayak | Freedom Struggle |
| Syed Nazir Ahmed | Freedom Struggle |
| Rajeshwari Bidar | Freedom Struggle |
| Jayatheertha Rao | Information Technology |
| H. S. Mukunda | Science |
| S. D. Pingale | Journalism |
| Ramzan Darga | Journalism |
| Syed Khalilullah | Journalism |
| Dubai Kannada Sangha | Overseas / Institution |
| B. V. Nagaraj | Overseas Kannadiga |
| Vidyamani Lingegowda | Medicine |
| Ramesh | Medicine |
| Mallikarjuna bin Sanganabasappa Biradar | Social Work |
| Uma Reddy | Social Work |
| U. Krishna Sharma | Others |
| Vedamurthykatte Parameshwara Thimmanna Bhatta | Others |
| Gurufraddy | Sports |
| N. V. Bankapur | Others |
| Bhimeshwara Joshi | Others |
| Chandrakanth Khandoji | Drama |
| S. V. Srinivasa Rao | Literature |
| D. V. Sudheendra | Cinema |
| Sumathi Navale Hiremath | Drama |
| Pailwan K. Chandrasekhar | Sports |
| Prema Guledagudda | Drama |
| Puttathimmaiah | Freedom Struggle |
| Eshwar Nayak | Folklore |
| B. Shekharappa Huligri | Education |
| Ramanagowda Hanumannagowda Jeevanagowdar | Folklore |
| K. M. Nagaraj | Social Work |
| Ruth Manorama | Social Work |
| Sudarshan Ballal | Medicine |
| N. Rajiv Shetty | Medicine |
| N. L. Cheluvaraj | Music |
| Chennappa Angadi | Folklore |
| N. Venkateshwaraiah | Social Work |
| R. K. Jamadar | Journalism |
| Shanthaveera Swamiji | Social Work |
| Annapurna Sagar | Drama |
| Bhaganna Madari | Folklore |
| Tennis Krishna | Cinema |
| Yediyoor Mudalagiri | Vachana Literature |
| H. V. Giriswamy | Medicine |
| Suhas Gopinath | Information Technology |
| Sheshanarayana | Others |
| H. R. Dasegowda | Freedom Struggle |
| S. Sridhar bin Shamanna | Social Work |
| Bisalalli Muddu | Overseas Kannadiga |
| Pramod | Medicine |
| Gopal Raju | Music |
| B. C. Geetha | Education |
| Gemini R. Satyanarayana | Social Work |
| Manohar Prasad | Journalism |
| Venkannachar | Sculpture |
