= Pleiades in folklore and literature =

Meanings of the star cluster among various cultures

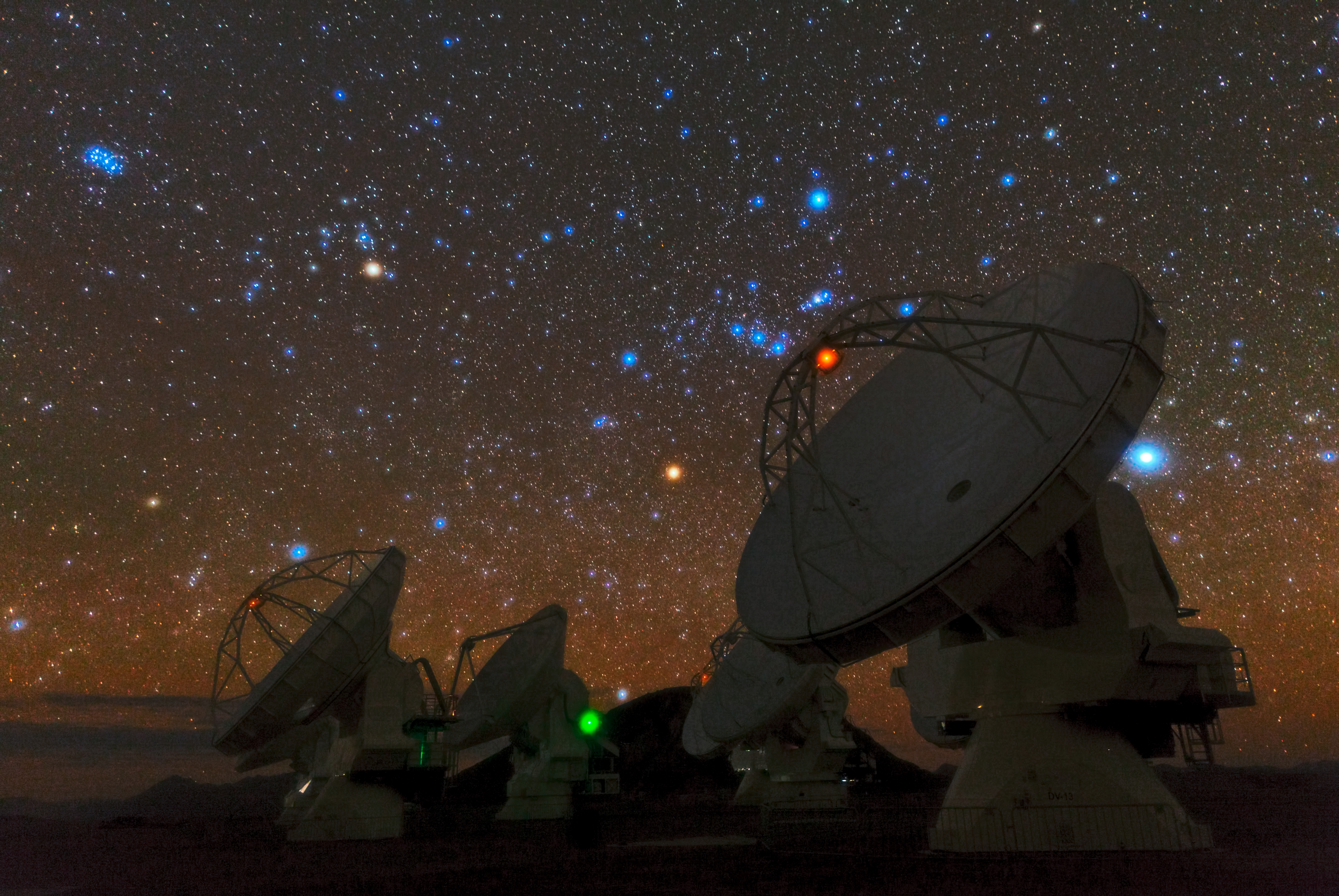
Pleiades seen with the naked eye (upper-left corner).

The high visibility of the star cluster Pleiades in the night sky and its position along the ecliptic (which approximates to the Solar System's common planetary plane) has given it importance in many cultures, ancient and modern. Its heliacal rising, which moves through the seasons over millennia (see precession) was nonetheless a date of folklore or ritual for various ancestral groups, so too its yearly heliacal setting.

As noted by scholar Stith Thompson, the constellation was "nearly always imagined" as a group of seven sisters, and their myths explain why there are only six. Some scientists suggest that these may come from observations back when Pleione was further from Atlas and more visible as a separate star as far back as 100,000 BC.

== North Africa ==
=== Berber people ===
Tuareg Berbers of the northern Sahara call the Pleiades Cat iheḍ (or -ahăḍ). This Berber name means: "daughters of the night". To many other Berbers it is Tagemmunt ("the group").

A Tuareg Berber proverb says:

Cat ahăḍ as uḍănăt, ttukayeɣ ttegmyeɣ, anwar daɣ ttsasseɣ. As d-gmaḍent, ttukayeɣ ttegmyeɣ tabruq ttelseɣ.
When the Pleiades fall, I wake looking for my goatskin bag to drink. When (the Pleiades) rise, I wake looking for cloth/clothes to wear.

Meaning: When the Pleiades "fall" with the sunset on the west, it still roughly (at J2000) means the hot, dry summer is coming. When they rise from the east with sunrise, the cold somewhat rainy season is coming. Nomads and others need to brace for these seasonal changes.

== Middle East ==
=== Mesopotamia ===
The Mesopotamian cuneiform texts of the MUL.APIN, which were produced from the seventh century BC onwards, describe Pleiades leap rules for the intercalation of months. They refer to a time well before the creation of the surviving clay tablets, which have been copied several times, namely the 26th century BC. This results from the astronomical dates explicitly given in the texts for the visibility of the Pleiades (Sumerian term MUL.MUL = "stars") and the beginnings of the months. The two surviving Babylonian Pleiades leap rules are recorded in lines eight to eleven of the second clay tablet of the MUL.APIN series. Although the cuneiform characters of the beginnings of lines ten and eleven have not been completely preserved, they can be reconstructed relatively reliably and meaningfully. A normal year has twelve lunar months. A full year requires the intercalation of a thirteenth lunar month. According to this leap rule, seven synodical month have to be intercalated within the duration of a Metonic cycle, which has exactly nineteen solar years.

8 When on the first Nisannu Pleiades and moon are in balance, this year is normal.
9 When on the third Nisannu Pleiades and moon are in balance, this year is full.
10 When the Pleiades rise on the first Ajaru, this year is normal.
11 When the Pleiades rise on the first Simanu, this year is full.

=== Bible, ancient Israelite religion and the Levant ===
In the Old Testament, the Pleiades (Hebrew: כימה, romanized: Khima) are mentioned three times. Each passage also mentions Orion, a nearby, bright, anthropomorphic constellation: Amos 5:8; Job 9:9; and Job 38:31. The first two are references about their creation. The third (taken in the context of following verses) stresses their ongoing nature in the night sky; God is speaking directly to Job and challenges him, asking if he can bind the chains of the Pleiades — the implication being that Job cannot, but God can.

=== Talmud ===
The Talmud (Berakhot 58b) suggests understanding ke' me-ah as kimah (כימה as כמאה) "about one hundred" stars in the Pleiades star cluster. Like most astronomical figures in rabbinic writing, the Jewish sages pointed to this as having come from Mount Sinai.

Rabbi Shlomo Yitzchaki ("Rashi") suggested even more stars within the cluster when he commented on the Talmud with a question, "What is meant by Kimah?" It is then understood that the Talmud was suggesting hundreds of stars in the Pleiades cluster, and that only the first hundred are mentioned due to them being the most important.

=== Other Jewish sources ===
According to Jewish folklore, when two fallen angels named Azazel and Shemhazai made it to the Earth, they fell strongly in love with the women of humankind. Shemhazai found a maiden named Istehar who swore she would give herself to him if he told her the sacred name which granted him the power to fly to Heaven. He revealed it to her, but she flew up to Heaven, never to fulfill her promise, thus she was placed in the constellation Pleiades, although she is also associated with the planet Venus.

=== Arabia and Islamic sources ===
In Arabic the Pleiades are known as al-Thurayya (الثريا), the first main consonant becoming a morpheme into outlying linguistic zones north and east. Some scholars of Islam suggested that the Pleiades are the "star" mentioned in Sura An-Najm ("The Star") of the Quran.

The name was borrowed into Persian and Turkish as a female given name, and is in use throughout the Middle East (for example Princess Soraya of Iran and Thoraya Obaid). It eponymises the Thuraya satellite phone system of the United Arab Emirates.

A Hadith recalled by Imam Bukhari, states:

A companion of The Holy Prophet (may the peace and blessings of Allah be upon him) relates: One day we were sitting with The Holy Prophet (may the peace and blessings of Allah be upon him) when this chapter (Note: Chapter 62 - Surah Al-Jummah - from the Qur'an) was revealed. I enquired from Muhammad (may the peace and blessings of Allah be upon him). Who are the people to whom the words "and among others of them who have not yet joined them" (Note: The verse quoted here is verse 3 from the aforementioned chapter) refer? Salman (may Allah be pleased with him), a Persian was sitting among us. The Holy Prophet (may the peace and blessings of Allah be upon him) put his hand on Salman (may Allah be pleased with him) and said. If faith were to go up to the Pleiades, a man from among these would surely find it. (Bukhari).

=== Turkey ===
In Turkish the Pleiades are known as Ülker. According to the Middle Turkic lexicographer Kaşgarlı Mahmud, writing in the 11th century, ülker çerig refers to a military ambush (çerig meaning 'troops in battle formation'): "The army is broken up into detachments posted in various places," and when one detachment falls back the others follow after it, and by this device "(the enemy) is often routed." Thus ülker çerig literally means 'an army made up of a group of detachments', which forms an apt simile for a star cluster. Ülker is also a unisex given name, a surname and the name of a food company best known for its chocolates.

=== Iran ===
In Farsi, the Pleiades is primarily known as Parvin (پروین) or Parveen. It is a common given name of Iranians, Afghanis and some Pakistanis.

== Europe ==
In French, pléiade means "a host" or "multitude". Pleiades has thus gained, in a few European tongues, several creative derivations of this non-stellar meaning.

=== Greek mythology ===
In Greek mythology, the stars of Pleiades represented the Seven Sisters. The constellation was also described as ἑπτάποροι "heptaporoi", by poet Aratus.

=== Western astrology ===
Kabbalistic "Pleiades" symbol from Libri tres de occulta philosophia (1531) by Heinrich Cornelius Agrippa.

The astrological Pleiades were described in Three Books of Occult Philosophy by Heinrich Cornelius Agrippa (Köln, 1533, but published manuscript as early as 1510).

In Western astrology they represent coping with sorrow and were considered a single one of the medieval fixed stars. As such, they are associated with quartz and fennel.

In esoteric astrology the seven planetary systems revolve around Pleiades.

=== Celtic mythology ===
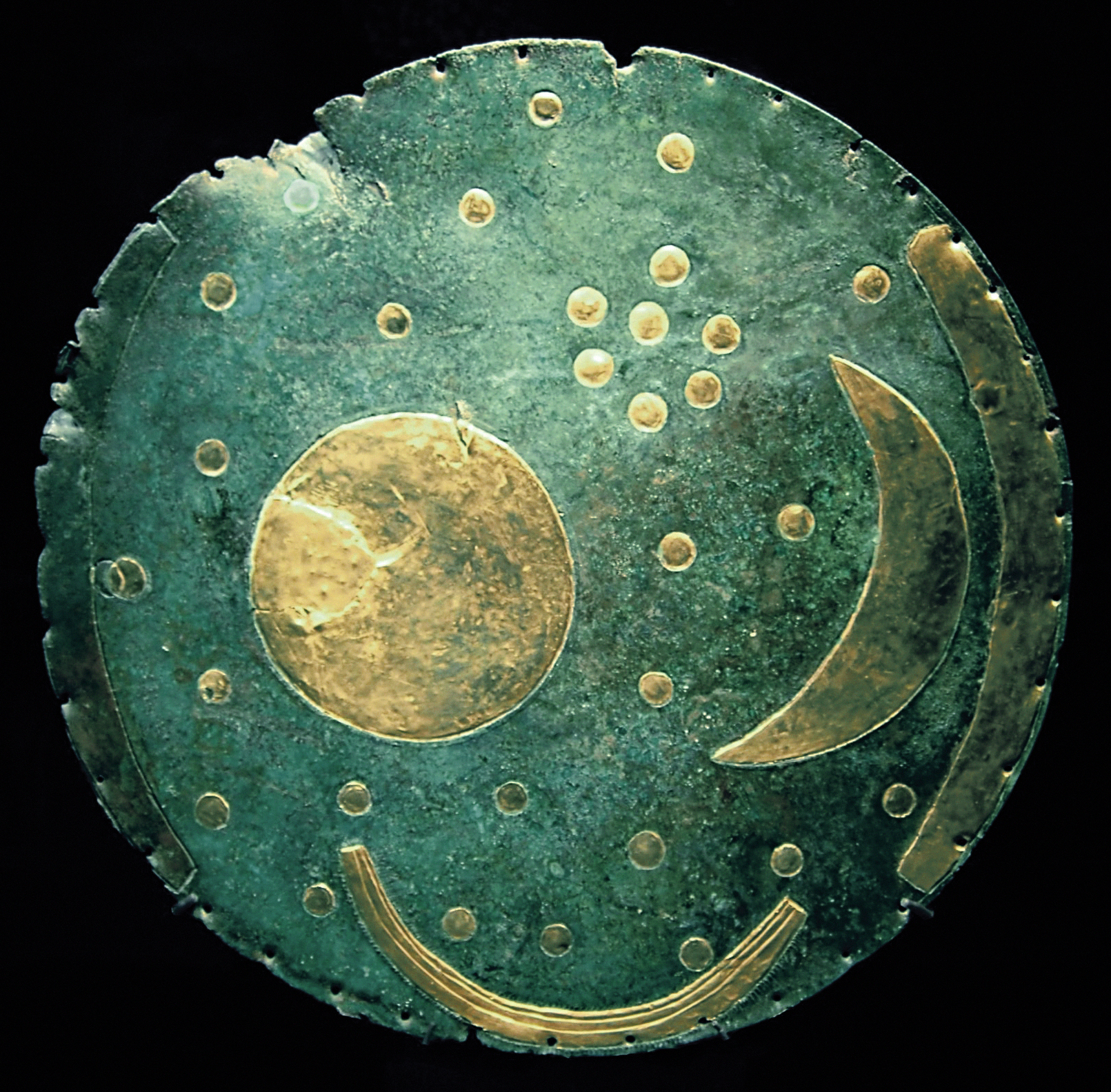
A bronze disk, 1600 BC, from Nebra, Germany, is one of the oldest known representations of the cosmos. The Pleiades are top right. See Nebra sky disk

To the Bronze Age people of Europe, such as the Celts (and probably considerably earlier), the Pleiades were associated with mourning and with funerals, since at that time in history, on the cross-quarter day between the autumn equinox and the winter solstice (see Samhain, also Halloween or All Souls Day), which was a festival devoted to the remembrance of the dead, the cluster rose in the eastern sky as the Sun's light faded in the evening. It was from this acronychal rising that the Pleiades became associated with tears and mourning. As a result of precession over the centuries, the Pleiades no longer marked the festival, but the association has nevertheless persisted, and may account for the significance of the Pleiades astrologically.

In later Welsh mythology, the Pleiades are known as Tŵr Tewdws (English: "Theodosius' Tower", but may also mean "Tower of Blessing" or "Tower of Light") Tŵr Tewdws is used as a metaphor by the fifteenth century bard Dafydd ab Edmwnd in his poem I Wallt Merch ("A lady’s hair").

=== Baltic mythology ===
In Baltic languages, the name for this constellation is Sietynas in Lithuanian and Sietiņš in Latvian, which is derived from sietas meaning "a sieve". In Lithuanian folk songs this constellation is often personified as a benevolent brother who helps orphan girls to marry or walks soldiers along the fields. But in Lithuanian folk tales as well as Latvian folk songs this constellation is usually depicted as an inanimate object, a sieve which gets stolen by the devil from the thunder god or is used to conjure light rain by thunder's wife and children.

=== Danish folklore ===
Ethnographer Svend Grundtvig collected a folkloric account of the myth of the Pleiades in Danish folklore ("The Pleiades, or the Seven Stars"). In this variant, six brothers travel the world to learn a trade and, with their combined help, rescue a kidnapped princess from a dwarf. Unable to choose which brother she likes best, God allows the seven to die in their sleep and turns them into the seven stars of the constellation.

=== Hungarian folklore ===
The old name of the starcluster in Hungarian is Fiastyúk, meaning "a hen with chicks".

=== Slavic folklore ===
==== Russian folklore ====
In historical Russian treatises about astronomy, the constellation was known as semizvedie, as well as vlasozelisci. Another Russian name to the constellation is Volosozhary or Volosynia, related by some scholars to the word volosy ('hair'), and to the god Volos.

==== Ukrainian folklore ====
In Ukrainian folklore, the Pleiades are known as Stozhary (Стожари), Volosozhary (Волосожари), or Baby-Zvizdy (Баби-Звізди).

Stozhary can be etymologically traced to stozharnya (стожарня) meaning a 'granary', 'storehouse for hay and crops', or can also be reduced to the root sto-zhar (сто-жар), meaning 'hundredfold glowing' or "a hundred embers".

Volosozhary (lit. 'the ones whose hair is glowing') or Baby-Zvizdy (lit. 'female stars') refer to the female tribal deities. According to the legend, seven maids lived long ago. They used to dance the traditional round dances and sing the glorious songs to honor the gods. After their death the gods turned them into water nymphs, and, having taken them to the Heavens, settled them upon the seven stars, where they dance their round dances (symbolic for moving the time) to this day.

In Ukraine, this asterism was considered a female talisman until recent times.

==== Belarusian tradition ====
The constellation of the Pleiades is known by several names in Belarusian tradition, such as Sitechko ('a sieve'), and, in a legend from the Horvats, there are seven vil ('spirits of deceased maidens') who dance around in a circle. Further studies by researcher Tsimafei Avilin show the main names of the constellation in Belarusian: Sieve (Sita or, rarely, Rešata, and variations) and The Hens (Kuročka and variations).

==== Serbian folklore ====
In Serbian folklore, the Pleiades can be called Vlašići (“children of Vlas"), a title possibly connected to Slavic deity Veles. The members of this asterism, considered to be "seven starry brothers", each receive an individual name: in one version, duos Mika and Mioka, Raka and Raoka, Orisav and Borisav, and the last Milisav; in another, Vole and Voleta, Rale and Raleta, Mile and Mileta and Pržožak; in a third, Mile and Mileta, Rade and Radeta, Bore and Boreta and Prigimaz.

In a version collected by Vuk Karadzic and published in the Archiv für slavische Philologie with the title Die Plejaden, a pair of brothers, Dragoman and Milan, lose their sister to a dragon and try to get her back. The dragon kills them. Years later, their mother gives birth to another son, named Busan. The boy suckles on his mother's breast for 7 years, becomes immensely strong and goes to kill the dragon. He rescues his sister and resurrects his brothers. Milan and Dragoman marry princesses, and the first fathers seven golden-haired children. The children, however, die in their sleep and are elevated to the sky as the Pleiades.

In another version by Karadzic, translated as Abermals die Plejaden ("Once again, the Pleiades"), a human prince recruits the services of five brothers, sons of a "dragon-woman", to rescue a princess. After the mission, they quarrel about who gets to keep the princess. Their mother solves the quarrel by taking the princess as their sister. The narration then tells that these are the seven stars of the Pleiades, also known in Serbian as Vlašići.

== Indigenous peoples of the Americas ==
It was common among the indigenous peoples of the Americas to measure keenness of vision by the number of stars the viewer could see in the Pleiades, a practice which was also used in historical Europe, especially in Greece. According to scholarship, some of the themes in their Pleiades stories involve dancing, a punishment inflicted on the characters, or the characters escaping to the sky.

=== Andean cultures ===
In the ancient Andes, the Pleiades were associated with abundance, because they return to the Southern Hemisphere sky each year at harvest-time. In Quechua they are called Qullqa (storehouse).

Indigenous Andeans study the appearance of the Pleiades to decide when to seed tubers, to ensure a successful harvest. In The Hatun Q'ero community, a community member is appointed each year to observe the Pleiades and make offerings to an apu and Pachamama to request the necessary weather conditions.

=== Assiniboine ===
In a tale collected in Belknap, attributed to the Assiniboine, seven youths discuss among themselves what they could change into. They decide to transform into stars by climbing a spiderweb.

=== Arawak ===
Dutch cartographer Claudius de Goeje reported that the Pleiades constellation among the Arawak is named wīwa yó-koro and marks the beginning of the year. De Goeje also states that the Pleiades as the beginning of the year occurred "with all the tribes of Guiana".

=== Aztec ===
According to Anthony Aveni, ancient Aztecs of Mexico and Central America based their calendar upon the Pleiades. Their year began when priests first remarked the asterism heliacal rising in the east, immediately before the Sun's dawn light obliterated the view of the stars. Aztecs called the Pleiades Tiānquiztli (Nahuatl pronunciation: [tiaːŋˈkistɬi]; Classical Nahuatl for "marketplace". Compare tianguis).

=== Blackfoot ===
Paul Goble, a British-American author who often depicted Native American stories, tells a Blackfoot legend that he says is told by other tribes as well. In the story, the Pleiades are orphans ("Lost Boys") that were not cared for by the people, so they became stars. Sun Man is angered by the mistreatment of the children and punishes the people with a drought, causing the buffalo to disappear, until the dogs, the only friends of the orphans, intercede on behalf of the people. Because the buffalo are not available while the Lost Boys are in the skies, the cosmic setting of the Pleiades was an assembly signal for Blackfoot hunter to travel to their hunting grounds to conduct the large-scale hunts, culminating in slaughters at buffalo jumps, that characterized their culture.

Another Pleiades story, attributed to the Blackfoot, names the constellation The Bunched Stars.

=== Caddo ===
In a Caddo tale, compiled by Frances Jenkins Olcott, a mother has seven boys who did not want to work. One night, their mother sent them to bed without supper and, in the next morning, without breakfast. The boys, who knew magic song, began to dance around their house and slowly make their ascent to the heavens, to become the Seven Stars, which can only be seen in winter.

=== Cherokee ===
A Cherokee myth (similar to that of the Onondaga people) indicates that seven boys who would not do their ceremonial chores and wanted only to play, ran around and around the ceremonial ball court in a circle, and rose up into the sky. Only six of the boys made it to the sky; the seventh was caught by his mother and fell to the ground with such force that he sank into the ground. A pine tree grew over his resting place.

=== Cheyenne ===
A Cheyenne myth "The Girl Who Married a Dog", states that the group of seven stars known as the Pleiades originated from seven puppies which a Cheyenne chief's daughter gave birth to after mysteriously being visited by a dog in human form to whom she vowed "Wherever you go, I go".

=== Haudenosaunee ===
A tale attributed to the Haudenosaunee (Iroquois) people tells that the Pleiades were six boys who danced atop a hill to the tune a seventh was singing. On a certain occasion, they danced so fast and so light they began to ascend to the skies, and thus became the constellation.

==== Onondaga ====
The Onondaga people's version of the story has lazy children who prefer to dance over their daily chores ignoring the warnings of the Bright Shining Old Man.

=== Hopi ===
The Hopi determined the passage of time for nighttime rituals in the winter by observing the Pleiades (Tsöötsöqam) and Orion's belt (Hotòmqam) through a kiva entrance hatch as they passed overhead. The Pleiades were depicted in a mural on one kiva wall.

=== Kiowa ===
The Kiowa of North America legend of the Seven Star Girls links the origin of the Pleiades to Devils Tower. The seven little girls were chased by bears, and climbed a low rock. They begged the rock to save them, and it grew higher and higher until they were pushed up into the sky. The seven girls became the Pleiades and the grooves on Devils Tower are the marks of the bear's claws.

=== Lakota ===
The Lakota Nation of North America had a legend that linked the origin of the Pleiades to Devils Tower.

=== Mono ===
The Monache people tell of six wives who loved onions more than their husbands and now live happily in "sky country".

=== Monte Alto Culture ===
The early Monte Alto Culture, and others in Guatemala such as Ujuxte and Takalik Abaj, made their early observatories using the Pleiades and Eta Draconis as reference; they were called the seven sisters, and thought to be their original land.

=== Nez Perce ===
A Nez Perce myth about this constellation mirrors the ancient Greek myths about the Lost Pleiades. In the Nez Perce version the Pleiades is also a group of sisters, however the story itself is somewhat different. One sister falls in love with a man and, following his death, is so absorbed by her own grief that she tells her sisters about him. They mock her and tell her how silly it is of her to feel sad for the human after his death, and she in return keeps her growing sadness to herself, eventually becoming so ashamed and miserable about her own feelings that she pulls the sky over her face like a veil, blocking herself from view. This myth explains why there are only six of the seven stars visible to the naked eye.

=== Navajo ===
The Pleiades (dilγéhé) play a major role in Navajo folklore and ritual. In the Navajo creation story, Upward-reachingway, the Pleiades was the first constellation placed in the sky by Black God. When Black God entered the hogan of creation, the Pleiades were on his ankle; he stamped his foot and they moved to his knee, then to his ankle, then to his shoulder, and finally to his left temple. The seven stars of dilγéhé are depicted on ceremonial masks of Black God, in sand paintings and on ceremonial gourd rattles.

=== Ojibwe ===
The Ojibwe language calls the Pleiades Bagone-giizhig (Hole in the Sky) or Madoo'asinik (Sweating Stones). One myth says that the Ojibwe/Anishinaabe themselves came from the stars through Bagone-giizhig. In traditional beliefs it is described as a gateway between the earth and the "star world", through which the star people come to speak to the Jiisakiiwin seers during their ceremonies.

A story similar to Iroquois and Cherokee stories describes the Pleiades as seven children who danced and played all day rather than helping around the camp, until they danced into the sky and can be seen there to this day, but one fell back to Earth. In summer, when the Pleiades are not in the sky, the children are said to be down on Earth joining in with the ceremonial dances.

=== Pacific Coast ===
In a tale attributed to Pacific Coast indigenous populations, the Pleiades are a family of seven sisters who, fed up with their husbands (all brothers) not sharing with them their game, want to be changed into stars. The husband of the youngest sister, the youngest of the seven brothers, accompanies his spouse and transforms into the constellation Taurus.

=== Pawnee ===
The Skidi Pawnee consider the Pleiades to be seven brothers. They observed the seven brothers, as well as Corona Borealis, the Chiefs, through the smoke hole of Pawnee lodges to determine the time of night.

A second tale tells the Pleiades are six brothers who rescue their sister, who becomes the seventh star of the constellation.

=== Seri ===
According to the Seris (of northwestern Mexico), these stars are seven women who are giving birth. The constellation is known as Cmaamc, which is apparently an archaic plural of the noun cmaam "woman".

=== Shasta ===
The Shasta people tell a story of the children of raccoon killed by coyote avenging their father's death and then rising into the sky to form the Pleiades. The smallest star in the cluster is said to be coyote's youngest who aided the young raccoons.

=== Tachi ===
In a tale from the Tachi people, the Pleiades are five sisters who lived in sky and marry a man named Flea. When he is ailed by an itch, they no longer like him and plan to leave him. He follows them to the sky.

=== Wyandot ===
In a tale attributed to the Wyandot people, seven Singing Maidens, daughters of the Sun and the Moon, who live in Sky Land, descend to Earth and dance with human children. Their father, wrathful at their disobedience, banishes them to another part of the sky. In another tale, the Pleiades are seven Star Sisters who descend to Earth in a basket. One day, a human hunter captures the youngest by her girdle while their sisters escape in the basket. The maiden promises to become the hunter's wife, but before he must accompany her to the sky.

== Asia ==
=== Nepal ===
To the Ban Raji people, who live semi-nomadically across western Nepal and Uttarakhand, the Pleiades are the "Seven sisters-in-law, and brother-in-law" (Hatai halyou daa Salla). They hold or held that when they can first make them out annually over the mountains straddling the upper Kali they feel happy to see their ancient kin. This is about eight hours afternoon by local, traditional time standards.

=== China ===
The earliest recorded reference to the Pleiades may be in Chinese astronomical literature dating from 2357 BCE. For agricultural tribes in the northern hemisphere, the course of the Pleiades indicated the beginning and ending of the growing seasons. In Chinese constellations they are known as mǎo (昴), the Hairy Head of the white tiger of the West.

=== India ===
In Indian astrology the Pleiades were known as the nakshatra Kṛttikā which in Sanskrit is translated as "the cutters". The Pleiades are called the star of fire, and their ruling deity is the fire god Agni. It is one of the most prominent of the nakshatra and is associated with anger and stubbornness. Karthigai (கார்த்திகை) in Tamil refers to the six wives of the seven rishis (sages), the seventh being Arundhati the wife of Vasistha which relates to the star Alcor in Ursa Major. The six stars in the Pleiades correspond to six wives, while the faithful wife Arundhati stuck with Sage Vasistha in Ursa Major. The six wives fell in love with Agni, hence the name Pleiades (star of fire).

=== Japan ===
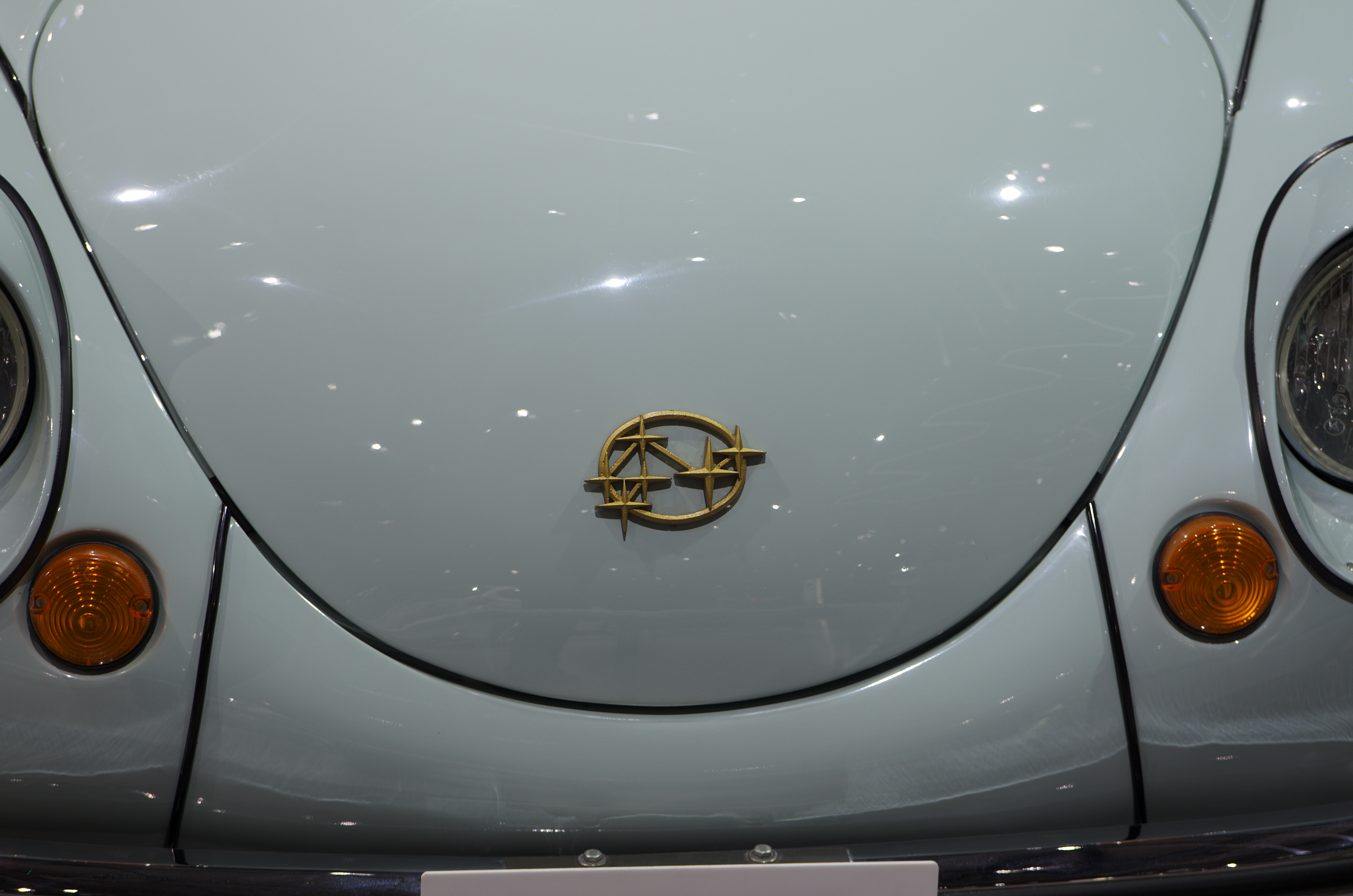

Former Subaru logo on a Subaru 360

In Japan, the Pleiades are known as Subaru (昴) which means "coming together" or "cluster" in Japanese and have given their name to the car manufacturer whose logo incorporates six stars to represent the five companies that merged into one. Subaru Telescope, located in Mauna Kea Observatory on Hawaii, is also named after the Pleiades.

=== Korea ===
In Korea, the Pleiades are known as Myoseong (묘성; 昴星, with the suffix seong meaning 'star'. It also goes by many other names, directly transliterated from English (Korean: 플레이아데스) and translated literally (일곱으로 된 한 벌 or 7인조 referring to "seven sisters").

=== Malay Archipelago ===
The cluster, known as Bintang Tujuh ("seven stars") or Bintang Puyuh ("sparrow stars") in Malay, is a marker in the traditional rice planting season in Kedah for sowing paddy seeds.

In the island of Java, the asterism is known in Javanese as Lintang Kartika or Gugus Kartika ("Kartika cluster"), a direct influence from the ancient Hindu Javanese. Influenced by Hinduism, the stars represent the seven princesses, which is represented in the court dance of Bedhaya Ketawang of the royal palaces of Surakarta. The dance is performed once per year, on the second day of the Javanese month of Ruwah (during May) and is performed by the nine females, relatives or wives of the Susuhunan (prince) of Surakarta before a private audience in the inner circle of the Sultanate family. Another name for Pleiades in Java is Wuluh.

In northern Java, its rising marks the arrival of the mangsa kapitu ("seventh season"), which marks the beginning of rice planting season.

Pleiades was once of most asterisms that used by Bugis sailors for navigation, called worong-porongngé bintoéng pitu, meaning "cluster of seven stars"

=== Philippines ===
In the Philippines the Pleiades are known as "Moroporo", meaning either “the boiling lights” or a flock of birds. Its appearance signified a new agricultural season, and thus starts the preparation for the new planting season.

=== Thailand ===
In Thailand the Pleiades are known as Dao Luk Kai (Thai: ดาวลูกไก่; literally, "Chick Stars") due to a Thai folk tale. The story tells that a poor elderly couple who lived in a forest had raised a family of chickens: a mother hen and her six (or alternately seven) chicks. One day a monk arrived at the couple's home during his dhutanga journey. Worried that they had no suitable food to offer him, the elderly couple contemplated cooking the mother hen. The hen overheard the conversation and rushed back to the coop to say farewell to her children. She told them to take care of themselves, and that her death would repay the kindness of the elderly couple, who had taken care of all of them for so long. As the mother hen's feathers were being burned over a fire, the chicks threw themselves into the fire to die along with their mother. The deity (in one version, Phya In in Northern Thai and Phra In in Thai, both referring to Indra), impressed by and in remembrance of their love, immortalized the seven chickens as the stars of the Pleiades. In tellings of the story in which there were only six chicks, the mother is included but often includes only the seven chicks.

== Oceania ==
The Motif Index of Polynesian Narratives locates stories about the genesis of the Pleiades in New Zealand, Cooks and in Rotuma. The myth of the Pleiades in South Pacific Islands is related to Matariki, and the stars were originally one.

=== Aotearoa New Zealand ===
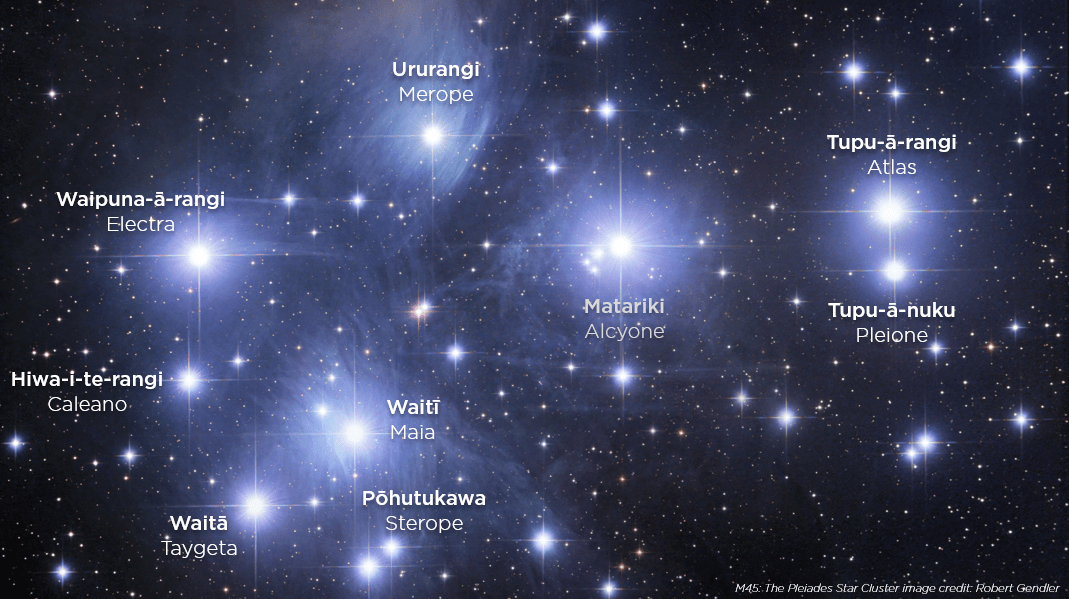
Māori and Greek names of the nine stars of Matariki

Occurring June 20 – June 22, the winter solstice (Te Maruaroa o Takurua) is seen by the New Zealand Māori as the middle of the winter season. It follows directly after the first sighting of Matariki (The Pleiades) and Puanga/Puaka (Rigel) in the dawn sky, an event which marked the beginning of the New Year and was said to be when the Sun turned from his northern journey with his winter-bride Takurua (Sirius) and began his journey back to his summer-bride Hine Raumati.

Author Kate Clark retold a Maori tale titled Matariki, or the Little Eyes.

=== Australia ===
Depending on the cultural/language group, there are several stories or songlines, regarding the origins of the Pleiades among Aboriginal Australian peoples, usually referred to as the Seven Sisters.

In the western desert region and cultural bloc, they are said to be seven sisters fleeing from the unwelcome attentions of a man represented by some of the stars in Orion, the hunter. In these stories, the man is called Nyiru or Nirunja, and the Seven Sisters songline known as Kungkarangkalpa. The seven sisters story often features in the artwork of the region.

A legend of the Wurundjeri people of south-eastern Australia has it that they are the fire of seven Karatgurk sisters. These women were the first to know fire-making and each carried live coals on the end of their digging sticks. They refused to share these coals with anybody and were ultimately tricked into giving up their secret by Crow, who brought fire to mankind. After this, they were swept into the night sky. Their glowing fire sticks became the bright stars of the Pleiades cluster.

The Wirangu people of the west coast of South Australia have a creation story embodied in a songline of great significance based on the Pleiades. In the story, the hunter (the Orion constellation) is named Tgilby. Tgilby, after falling in love with the seven sisters, known as Yugarilya, chases them out of the sky, onto and across the Earth. He chases them as the Yugarilya chase a snake, Dyunu.

=== Hawaii ===
There is an analogous holiday in Hawaiʻi known as Makahiki. The makahiki season begins with a new moon following the rising of the pleiades (or makali`i) just after sunset instead of the heliacal rising.

The Hawaiian creation chant known as the Kumulipo also begins with reference to the pleiades (known as the makali`i).

=== Rotuma ===
C. Maxwell Churchward transcribed a tale from the Rotuma about the origin of the Pleiades he dubbed The Two Sisters Who Became Constellations, or in the original language Sianpual'etaf ma Sianpual'ekia' ("Sianpual'etaf and Sianpual'ekia"). In this tale, two sisters, the older Sianpual'etaf, ("Girl Shining In The-Light") and the younger Sianpual'ekia ("Girl Shining In The-Sunset-Glow"), escape from their cruel husbands and become constellations: the older becomes "The Little Eyes" and the younger "The Fan".

=== Samoa ===
In Samoa, the Pleiades constellation is called Matalii or Mataalii, meaning "Eyes of the Chiefs".

== Subsaharan Africa ==
=== Bantu languages ===
Across the Bantu languages of Southern Africa, the Pleiades are associated with agriculture, from a verb -lima 'cultivate', e.g., Giryama kirimira, Kaguru chilimia; Xhosa and Zulu isilimela; Sotho and Tswana selemela; Tsonga shirimela, Venda tshilimela; Karanga chirimera; Nyabungu kelemera; Nyasa lemila.

==== Basotho ====
In related Sesotho (of far Southern Africa's Basotho, or people of Sotho), the Pleiades are called Seleme se setshehadi, which means "the female planter". Its disappearance in April (the 10th month) and the appearance of the star Achernar signals the beginning of the cold season. Like many neighbours, the Basotho associate its visibility with agriculture and plenty.

==== Waswahili ====
In Swahili, the cluster is called "kilimia" (from Proto-Bantu "*ki-dimida" in Bantu areas E, F, G, J, L and S), meaning 'The Ploughing Stars'. The word comes from the verb -lima meaning "dig" or "cultivate", as their visibility was taken as a sign to prepare digging as the onset of the rain was near.

==== Zulu ====
Among the Zulu people, the Pleiades are called in Zulu isi-limela or isiLimela ('the-planting-sign', in Bryant's translation; 'the digging-for (stars)', in James George Frazer's), which, according to ethnologue Alfred Thomas Bryant, marked the beginning of the rain or planting season.

== Modern beliefs ==
=== Jehovah's Witnesses ===
The 19th century astronomer Johann Heinrich von Mädler proposed the Central Sun Hypothesis, according to which all stars revolve around the star Alcyone, in the Pleiades. Based on this hypothesis, the Jehovah's Witnesses denomination taught until the 1950s that Alcyone was likely to be the site of the throne of God.

=== Theosophy ===
In Theosophy, it is believed the Seven Stars of the Pleiades focus the spiritual energy of the Seven Rays from the Galactic Logos to the Seven Stars of the Great Bear, then to Sirius, then to the Sun, then to the god of Earth (Sanat Kumara) and finally through the seven Masters of the Seven Rays to us.

=== UFOs ===
In Ufology some believers describe Nordic alien extraterrestrials (called Pleiadeans) as originating from this system.

== Modern literature ==
The name of the constellation inspired a group of Alexandrian poets, the Alexandrian Pleiad, then the French literary movement La Pléiade.

The "Netted Stars" known as Remmirath in The Fellowship of the Ring by J. R. R. Tolkien are likely a reference to the Pleiades, given their appearance and proximity to a red star called Borgil (identified with Aldebaran) and the constellation Menelvagor of the Shining Belt (Orion). As in real life, Remmirath rise before Borgil and Menelvagor.

Children's book author Edith Ogden Harrison gave the myth of the Pleiades a literary treatment in her book Prince Silverwings, and other fairy tales, as the tale of The Cloud Maidens. The story tells of the courtship of one of the Seven Sisters by the legendary Man in the Moon. Unfortunately, the Cloud Maiden is banished to Earth and becomes the "Maid of the Mist".

Another etiological tale, from a Slavic source, is The Seven Stars: a princess is kidnapped by a dragon, so the high chamberlain seeks a "Dragon-mother" and her sons, who each possess extraordinary abilities, to rescue her. At the end of the tale, the rescuers and the chamberlain enter a dispute on who should have the princess, but the "Dragon-mother" suggests they should treasure her as a sister, and to keep protecting her. As such, the seven are elevated to the sky as "The Seven Stars" (the Pleiades).

The Irish writer Lucinda Riley has published a series of books about The seven sisters that is based on the Pleiades of the ancient Greek mythology.
