= Turan-Mirza Kamal =

Turan-Mirza Kamal (1951–2004) was an American-born classical guitarist and composer as well as a chef.

Kamal was born in California. Ethnically Kazan Tatar and Nogai Tatar, Kamal was raised and educated in Turkey, Switzerland, Spain, England, and France. Kamal studied in his early adolescence under Antonio Ortega, Andrés Segovia, Julian Bream and Spanish composer Emilio Pujol. At 16, he was accepted to The Royal College of Music and the Royal Academy of Music in London, but on his father's urgings attended The University of California, Santa Barbara. There, he made his professional debut in 1972 at the Lotte Lehmann Theater at UCSB. That same year, he debuted in New York City at the Spanish Institute. His performance career took him throughout the world, and he continued to perform until an operation on his left wrist hindered his career.

Kamal was also a composer and would often perform his suite Khroma, which detailed musically the struggle of the Tartar people under the Cossacks. The piece included radically modern classical guitar elements alongside more traditional Russian musical and folk elements.

In addition to music, Kamal was also a chef who specialized in traditional Tatar food.

Kamal died of cancer in November, 2004.
