= Nargiz Aliyarova =

Azerbaijani-born pianist

- Born: Baku, Azerbaijan SSR, Soviet Union
- Citizenship: Soviet Union; Republic of Azerbaijan
- Occupations: Pianist; Scholar

Nargiz Aliyarova (b. 1968; Baku, Azerbaijan SSR, Soviet Union) is a professor of the Baku Music Academy, soloist of the Azerbaijan State Piano Trio, laureate of the 2nd Republican Competition of Musicians, founder of the National Society of Music and Global Culture, laureate of international competitions, and Honored Artist of Azerbaijan.

== Life ==
Nargiz Aliyarova was born in 1968 in Baku. In 1986, she graduated from Bülgül music secondary school with honors. In 1986–1991, she studied at the piano faculty of the Baku Academy of Music, was awarded a Lenin scholarship during her studies, and graduated from the academy with honors. She started working as a teacher at the academy in 1992 and completed her post-graduate studies in 1993. She completed her doctoral studies in 2000 and became a professor in 2017. Since 2002, she has been a soloist of the Azerbaijan State Piano Trio; in 2008, she was awarded the honorary title of "Honored Artist of Azerbaijan"; in 2008, she was the laureate of the international competition of pianists in Italy; In 2015, she was presented with the "Azerbaijan State Prize" for the CD "Nargiz Aliyarova performs the works of Chopin". In addition, she has to her name "Nargiz Aliyarova performs the works of Haydn, Mozart və Beethoven" and "Nargiz Aliyarova performs the music of Azerbaijan".

== See also ==
- Turan Manafzade
