= Rıfat Bali =

Turkish historian (born 1948)

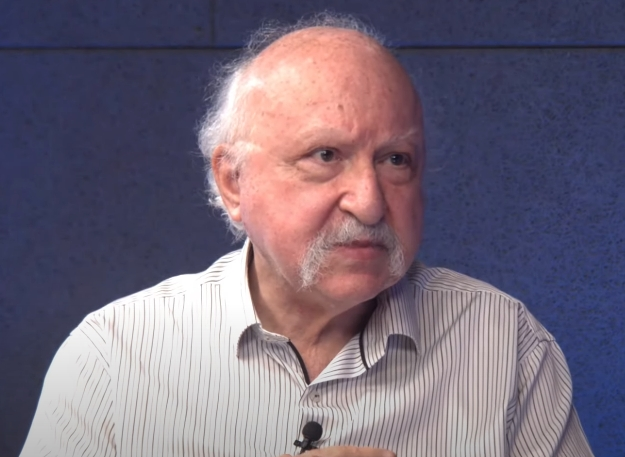
- Bali in 2024
- Born: 1948 (age 77–78); Istanbul, Turkey
- Education: Lycée Français Saint-Michel; Lycée Saint-Benoît d'Istanbul
- Alma mater: École pratique des hautes études
- Occupations: Historian; publisher
- Website: https://www.rifatbali.com

Rıfat Nesim Bali (born 1948) is a Turkish historian specializing in Jews in Turkey. He is the managing director of Libra Books, an academic press based in Istanbul specializing in topics related to Turkish and Ottoman history.

== Biography ==
Bali was born to a Sephardic family in Istanbul in 1948. After receiving his primary education in a Jewish school in Istanbul, he attended Lycée Français Saint-Michel for secondary school and Lycée Saint-Benoît d'Istanbul for high school. He graduated from the Ecole Pratique des Hautes Etudes, Sorbonne University.

Since 1996, he has been conducting research and publishing on topics such as non-Muslim minorities, particularly Jews, antisemitism, conspiracy theories as well as cultural and social change in Turkish society. His articles have been published in various journals, including Tarih ve Toplum, Toplumsal Tarih, Birikim, and Virgül. He has contributed articles to numerous compilations and encyclopedias and edited numerous books.

In 2005, he won the Yunus Nadi Award for his book From Anatolia to the New World (Turkish: Anadolu'dan Yeni Dünyaya) and again in 2008 with his book Sami Günzberg, the Chief Dentist of the Palace and the Republic (Turkish: Sarayın ve Cumhuriyetin Dişçibaşısı Sami Günzberg). In 2009, he won the Alberto Benveniste Research Award for his published writings on Turkish Jewry.

== Personal life ==
He is married and has two children.

== Bibliography ==
=== Books ===
- Türkiye’de Kitabın ve Yazarın Serencamı - Yasaklamalar, Sansürler, Boykotlar, İmhalar (1923-2025), 2025.
- Metr Salem – Leon Faraci ve Bir Rüşvet Davası, Mayıs 1934 – Mayıs 1935, 2025.
- Elsa Niego Cinayeti – 17 Ağustos 1927 Çarşamba, Saat 18.55, 2025.
- Bir Kıyımın, Bir Talanın Öyküsü III: Hurdaya (S)Atılan Matbu ve Yazma Eserler, Evrak-ı Metrukeler, Arşivler, 2025.
- İstanbul’un Mazisinde Kalmış Kitabevlerinin Hikâyeleri, 2025.
- Tarantolar ve Varlık Vergisi, 2025.
- Büyük Bir Tüccar, Unutulmuş Bir Gazete Patronu ve Başyazarı – Habib Edip Törehan (2 cilt), 2024.
- Bilanço Zamanı: Bâkî Kalan Bu Kubbede Bir Boş Sadâ İmiş (1992-2023), 2024.
- Ruben Asa – Cambaz Bir Tüccarın Hayat Hikâyesi, 2023.
- Edirne Mebusu Mehmet Şeref Aykut’un Munis Tekinalp’e Mektubu (20 Nisan 1934), 2023.
- Gilberto Primi – Bir Levanten Gazetecinin Hayat Hikâyesi ve Türkçe Yazıları, 2022.
- Yirmi Kur’a Nafia Askerleri – Gayrimüslimlerin Askerlik Serüveni (Mayıs 1941 – Temmuz 1942) (Genişletilmiş 2. baskı), Libra Kitap, Istanbul, 2022.
- Life Style’dan Yeni Türkiye’ye – Yeni Binyıl’ın Türkiyesi’nden Manzaralar (2001-2021), Libra Kitap, Istanbul, 2022.
- Jak Barbut – İstanbul Merkez Hapishanesi Başhekimi, Libra Kitap, Istanbul, 2022.
- Geniş Toplum Bizleri Yeterince Tanımıyor: Türk Yahudi Toplumu ve Türkiye Sahnesi’nde Temsil Edilme Halleri, Libra Kitap, Istanbul, 2022.
- Kara Sakallı, Kızıl Ruhlu Bir Gazeteci: Arslan Humbaracı, Libra Kitap, Istanbul, 2022.
- Türkiye’de Özel Girişimciliğin Gelişimi ve İş İnsanlarının Ağzından Başarı Hikâyeleri (1930’lardan 1960’lara), Libra Kitap, Istanbul, 2021.
- Dikili Apartımanı Olan Doktorlar: Onuncu Yılda Kazanç Vergisi Tartışmaları, Şeref Etker’in önsözü ve notlarıyla, Libra Kitap, Istanbul, 2021.
- The Attempted Pogrom Against Turkish Jews of Thrace, June–July 1934, Libra Kitap, Istanbul, 2021. ISBN 978-60543-2619-8
- Cumhuriyet Yıllarında Türkiye Yahudileri – Devlet’in Örnek Yurttaşları (1950-2003) (2. baskı), Libra Kitap, Istanbul, 2021.
- Toplu Makaleler VI – Tarih, Basın ve Popüler Edebiyat Yazıları, Libra Kitap, Istanbul, 2021.
- Matbuat Tarihinin Unutulmaz Bir Patronu – Halil Lütfü Dördüncü, Libra Kitap, Istanbul, 2021.
- İstanbul’da Antika Müzayedeleri – İlânlar (1921-1980), Libra Kitap, Istanbul, 2021.
- Türkiye’de Antikacılar, Koleksiyonerler ve Müzayedeler (1855-1980), Libra Kitap, Istanbul, 2021.
- Bir Kıyımın, Bir Talanın Öyküsü – Hurdaya (S)Atılan Matbu ve Yazma Eserler, Evrak-ı Mertûkeler, Arşivler – II, Libra Kitap, Istanbul, 2020.
- Türkiye’de Yayımlanmış Yahudilikle İlgili Kitap, Tez ve Makaleler Bibliyografyası 2004-2019, Libra Kitap, Istanbul, 2020.
- Betar Türkiye – Bir Siyonist Gençlik Hareketinin Hikâyesi (1933-1971), Libra Kitap, Istanbul, 2020.
- Toplu Makaleler V – Sosyal, Kültürel, Siyasi Yönleriyle Türk Yahudileri, Libra Kitap, Istanbul, 2019.
- Yolları Kesişen Aileler ve Hayatlar – Baliler, Filozoflar, Diğerleri ve… Ben, Libra Kitap, Istanbul, 2019.
- Le Journal d’Orient Gazetesi ve İstanbullu Azınlıkların ve Levantenlerin Cemiyet Hayatı (1950-1971), Libra Kitap, Istanbul, 2018.
- Toplu Makaleler IV – Mülakatlar, Libra Kitap, Istanbul, 2018.
- SAFEHAVEN – İkinci Dünya Savaşı Sonrasında Türkiye'deki Nazi Varlıkları Meselesi, Libra Kitap, Istanbul, 2018.
- Türkiye'de Holokost Tüketimi (1989-2017), Libra Kitap, Istanbul, 2017.
- İsrail Başkonsolosu Ephraim Elrom'un İnfazı – Çok Cesur Bir Adamdı. Sonuna Kadar Direndi., Libra Kitap, Istanbul, 2016.
- Komplo Teorileri – Cehaletin ve Antisemitizmin Resm-i Geçidi, Libra Kitap, Istanbul, 2016.
- Satvet Lütfi Tozan – Büyük Bir Maceraperest, Koleksiyoner, Hayırsever, Libra Kitap, Istanbul, 2016.
- Bir Kıyımın, Bir Talanın Öyküsü: Hurdaya (S)Atılan Matbu ve Yazma, Libra Kitap, Istanbul, 2014.
- Saray’ın ve Cumhuriyet’in Dişçibaşısı Sami Günzberg (Yeni baskı), Libra Kitap, Istanbul, 2014.
- Dr. Jak Barbut – Surgeon of the Istanbul Penitentiary, Libra Kitap, Istanbul, 2014.
- Azınlıkları Türkleştirme Meselesi Ne İdi? Ne Değildi?, Libra Kitap, Istanbul, 2014.
- Unutulmuş Bir Fikir Adamı ve Hukuk Âlimi: Milaslı Gad Franko, Libra Kitap, Istanbul, 2013.
- Toplu Makaleler III – Kitabiyat Yazıları, Libra Kitap, Istanbul, 2013.
- Toplu Makaleler II – Türkiye’de Antisemitizm ve Komplo Kültürü, Libra Kitap, Istanbul, 2013.
- Antisemitism and Conspiracy Theories in Turkey, Libra Kitap, Istanbul, 2013. ISBN 978-60543-2673-0
- Xenophobia and Protectionism: A Study of the 1932 Law Reserving Majority of Occupations in Turkey to Turkish Nationals, Libra Kitap, Istanbul, 2013.
- The Silent Minority in Turkey: Turkish Jews, Libra Kitap, Istanbul, 2013.
- Toplu Makaleler I – Tarihin Ufak Bir Dipnotu: Azınlıklar, Libra Kitap, Istanbul, 2013.
- From Anatolia to the New World: Life Stories of the First Turkish Immigrants to America, Libra Kitap, 2012. ISBN 9786054326648.
- Model Citizens of the State: The Jews of Turkey during the Multi-Party Period, Rowman & Littlefield, Lanham, 2012. ISBN 978-1611475364.
- 1934 Trakya Olayları, Libra Kitap, Istanbul, 2012.
- Bir Günah Keçisi: Munis Tekinalp (3 cilt), Libra Kitap, Istanbul, 2012.
- Gayrimüslim Mehmetçikler: Hatıralar – Tanıklıklar, Libra Kitap, Istanbul, 2011.
- Tabutluklar, Sansaryan Han ve İki Emniyet Müdürü, Libra Kitap, Istanbul, 2011.
- L'Affaire Impôt Sur la Fortune (Varlık Vergisi), Libra Kitap, Istanbul, 2010.
- Savarona: Atatürk'e Son Armağan, Libra Kitap, Istanbul, 2010.
- Portraits From a Bygone Istanbul: Georg Mayer and Simon Brod, Libra Kitap, Istanbul, 2010.
- The Saga of a Friendship, Libra Kitap, Istanbul, 2009.
- Devletin Örnek Yurttaşları, Kitabevi, Istanbul, 2009.
- Yirmi Kur'a Nafıa Askerleri, Kitabevi, İstanbul, 2008.
- A Scapegoat For All Seasons: The Dönmes or Crypto-Jews of Turkey, The Isis Press, Istanbul, 2008. ISBN 978-97542-8363-1.
- The Jews and Prostitution in Constantinople, 1854–1922, The Isis Press, Istanbul, 2008.
- US Diplomatic Documents on Turkey – IV: New Documents on Atatürk: Atatürk As Viewed Through the Eyes of American Diplomats, The Isis Press, Istanbul, 2007.
- Maziyi Eşelerken, Dünya Kitapları, İstanbul, 2006.
- The Varlık Vergisi Affair: A Study on Its Legacy – Selected Documents, The Isis Press, Istanbul, 2005.
- Ümit Kıvanç'a Cevap – Birikim Dergisinin Yayınlamayı Reddettiği Makalenin Öyküsü, İstanbul, 2005.
- Türkiye'de Yayınlanmış Yahudilikle İlgili Kitap, Tez ve Makaleler Bibliyografyası (1923–2003), Turkuaz Yayıncılık, İstanbul, 2004.
- Anadolu'dan Yeni Dünya'ya: Amerika'ya Göç Eden İlk Türklerin Yaşam Öyküleri, İletişim Yayınları, İstanbul, 2004.
- Devlet'in Yahudileri ve Öteki Yahudi, İletişim Yayınları, İstanbul, 2004.
- Cumhuriyet Yıllarında Türkiye Yahudileri – Aliya: Bir Toplu Göçün Öyküsü, 1946–1949, İletişim Yayınları, İstanbul, 2003.
- Tarz-ı Hayat'tan Life Style'a, İletişim Yayınları, İstanbul, 2002.
- Musa'nın Evlâtları Cumhuriyet’in Yurttaşları, İletişim Yayınları, İstanbul, 2001.
- Les Relations Entre Turcs et Juifs Dans la Turquie Moderne (Modern Türkiye'de Türkler ve Yahudiler Arasında İlişkiler), Les Editions Isis, Istanbul, 2001.
- Cumhuriyet Yıllarında Türkiye Yahudileri – Bir Türkleştirme Serüveni (1923–1945), İletişim Yayınları, İstanbul, 2000.

=== Edited volumes ===
- A Short History of YWCA Istanbul Service Centers 1911–1938, 2026.
- This is My New Homeland: Life Stories of Turkish Jewish Immigrants – V, 2025.
- Türk Karikatüründe Yahudiler (1924–1940), 2025.
- Türk Karikatüründe Yahudiler (1941–1945), 2025.
- Jewish Edirne – History, Culture, Music, 2024.
- Three Oral History Interviews on the Aliyah of Turkey’s Jews, 2024.
- Documents on the History of the Béné Bérith Lodge of Istanbul, 2024.
- From Istanbul to Haifa – The Aliyah of Yaakov Krudo and His Friends – March 1949, 2024.
- Mustafa Nermi – Hayat Hikâyesi – Seçilmiş Yazıları, 2024.
- Varlık Vergisi: İtirazlar, Hatıralar, Hiciv Şiirleri ve Yazıları, 2024.
- Türk Lakaplı Hollandalı Bir Subay: Raymond Westerling, 2023.
- Türkiye’de Fransızca Basın – Fransız ve İngiliz Arşiv Belgeleri Eşliğinde, 2022.
- Mémoire Sur La Prostitution Publique à Constantinople, 2021.
- The Anti-Greek Riots of September 6–7, 1955 – Documents from the World Council of Churches, Libra Kitap, Istanbul, 2021.
- Türkiye’de Antikacılar, Koleksiyonerler ve Müzayedeler (1929–1980): Haberler – Yazılar, Libra Kitap, Istanbul, 2021.
- Mazide Kalmış Koleksiyonerler, Libra Kitap, Istanbul, 2020.
- Mazide Kalmış Yayınevleri – Mülakatlar, Libra Kitap, Istanbul, 2020.
- Türkiye’de Kitap Koleksiyonerleri ve Sahaflar – II, Libra Kitap, Istanbul, 2020.
- Amerika’daki İlk Türk Göçmenler: Hayat Hikâyeleri, Libra Kitap, Istanbul, 2020.
- Satvet Lütfi Tozan – Yeni Belgeler, Libra Kitap, Istanbul, 2020.
- 6-7 Eylül 1955 Olayları: Tanıklar – Hatıralar – II, Libra Kitap, Istanbul, 2020.
- Hatıratlarda Türkiye Yahudileri, Libra Kitap, Istanbul, 2020.
- Kurum ve Sektör Tarihi, İş İnsanı ve Yönetici Hatırat, Biyografi ve Otobiyografi Kitapları Bibliyografyası (1932–2018), Libra Kitap, Istanbul, 2019.
- This Is My New Homeland: Life Stories of Turkish Jewish Immigrants – IV, Libra Kitap, Istanbul, 2019.
- Mazide Kalmış Bir Yaşam Tarzı: Yahudi Mahalleleri, 2018.
- Aliya: Türk Yahudilerinin İsrail'e Göç Hikâyeleri, Libra Kitap, Istanbul, 2018.
- This Is My New Homeland: Life Stories of Turkish Jewish Immigrants – III, Libra Kitap, Istanbul, 2018.
- Costa Gaziadi et Les Mémoires de 50 Ans d'un Journaliste d'Istanbul (1905–1955), Libra Kitap, Istanbul, 2017.
- Genciz, Türküz, Yahudiyiz, Yerli Yabancı Değiliz – Türk Yahudi Gençleri, Libra Kitap, Istanbul, 2017.
- This Is My New Homeland: Life Stories of Turkish Jewish Immigrants – II, Libra Kitap, Istanbul, 2017.
- Meçhul Yahudiler Ansiklopedisi – II, Libra Kitap, Istanbul, 2017.
- This Is My New Homeland: Life Stories of Turkish Jewish Immigrants, Libra Kitap, Istanbul, 2016.
- Meçhul Yahudiler Ansiklopedisi, Libra Kitap, Istanbul, 2016.
- Türkiye'deki Yahudi Toplumlarından Geriye Kalanlar, Libra Kitap, Istanbul, 2016.
- Jewish Journalism and Press in the Ottoman Empire and Turkey, Libra Kitap, Istanbul, 2016.
- Essais sur L'Histoire de la Latinité à Istanbul, Libra Kitap, Istanbul, 2016.
- Souvenirs d’un Journaliste – Izmir il y a 60 Ans, Libra Kitap, Istanbul, 2016.
- Anti-Greek Riots of September 6–7, 1955 – Documents from the American National Archives, Libra Kitap, Istanbul, 2016.
- Istanbul d’Hier, Sans Lendemains, Libra Kitap, Istanbul, 2015.
- Kütüphanelere, Kitabiyata ve Kitap Koleksiyonerlerine Dair Yazılar, Libra Kitap, Istanbul, 2015.
- Turkish History 1918–1931 As Interpreted by Two American Diplomats, Libra Kitap, Istanbul, 2015.
- Turkish Jews in Contemporary Turkey, Libra Kitap, Istanbul, 2015.
- Gazeteci Hikmet Tuna'nın Hatıraları, Libra Kitap, Istanbul, 2014.
- The Best Known American in Turkey: Betty Carp, Libra Kitap, Istanbul, 2014.
- Büyük Bir Kitabiyat Âlimi ve Bibliyografyacı: M. Seyfettin Özege, Libra Kitap, Istanbul, 2014.
- Türkiye'de Kitap Koleksiyonerleri ve Sahaflar, Libra Kitap, Istanbul, 2013.
- Varlık Vergisi: Hatıralar – Tanıklıklar, Libra Kitap, Istanbul, 2012.
- The Wealth Tax (Varlık Vergisi) Affair – Documents From the British National Archives, Libra Kitap, Istanbul, 2012.
- An Overview of the Turkish Press Through the Reports of American Diplomats (1925–1962), Libra Kitap, Istanbul, 2011.
- Revival of Islam in Turkey in the 1950's Through the Reports of American Diplomats, Libra Kitap, Istanbul, 2011.
- American Diplomats in Turkey – Oral History Transcripts (Vols. I–II), Libra Kitap, Istanbul, 2011.
- 6-7 Eylül 1955 Olayları: Tanıklar – Hatıralar, Libra Kitap, Istanbul, 2010.
- Turkey in the 1960's and 1970's Through the Reports of American Diplomats, Libra Kitap, Istanbul, 2010. ISBN 9786054326198.
- A Survey of Some Social Conditions in Smyrna, Asia Minor – May 1921, Libra Kitap, Istanbul, 2009.
- US Diplomatic Documents on Turkey – VI: Sports and Physical Education in Turkey in the 1930's, The Isis Press, Istanbul, 2009.
- Avram Benaroya: Hayatı ve Anıları, 47 Numara Yayıncılık, Istanbul, 2009.
- US Diplomatic Documents on Turkey – V: The First Ten Years of the Turkish Republic Through the Reports of American Diplomats, The Isis Press, Istanbul, 2009.
- Georg Mayer Türk Çarşısı / Şark’ta Ticaretin Püf Noktaları, Kitabevi, İstanbul, 2008.
- US Diplomatic Documents on Turkey – III: Family Life in the Turkish Republic of the 1930s, The Isis Press, Istanbul, 2007.
- US Diplomatic Documents on Turkey – II: The Turkish Cinema in the Early Republican Years, The Isis Press, Istanbul, 2007. ISBN 978-975428336-5.
- US Diplomatic Documents on Turkey – I: Turkish Students’ Movements and the Turkish Left in the 1950’s–1960’s, The Isis Press, Istanbul, 2006.
- Avram Benaroya: Un Journaliste Juif Oublié Suivi de Ses Mémoires, Les Editions Isis, İstanbul, 2004.
- Maurice Caraco, La Famille Calderon ou Chronique de la Vie Juive de Constantinople au Début du 20e Siècle, The Isis Press, Istanbul, 2002.
- Mme. A. Guéron, Journal du Siège d'Andrinople – 30 Octobre 1912 – 26 Mars 1913, The Isis Press, Istanbul, 2002.
- Eli Şaul, Balat'tan Bat Yam'a, İletişim Yayınları, 1999 (Birsen Talay ile birlikte).
- Nissim M. Benezra, Une Enfance Juive à Istanbul (1911–1929), The Isis Press, Istanbul, 1996.
- Avner Levi, Türkiye Cumhuriyeti'nde Yahudiler, İletişim Yayınları, 1996.

== Bibliography ==
- Şişman, Cengiz (2010). "Bali, Rifat". In Stillman, Norman A. (ed.). Encyclopedia of Jews in the Islamic World. E. J. Brill.
