= Meghna Bali =

Australian journalist

Meghna Bali is an Australian journalist, from 2025 the Australian Broadcasting Corporation's (ABC) bureau chief for South Asia.

== Career ==
Bali studied journalism at the University of Western Sydney and began working as a freelance reporter and photographer. She began working for the ABC in 2017 in various locations on the east coast. She has worked as a research assistant for Four Corners, and for Hack, Triple j's current affairs program.

Since being appointed bureau chief for South Asia she has reported on subjects as varied as Australian women cricketers in India and life for ordinary people in Afghanistan.

== Recognition ==
In 2022 Bali was named the year's Andrew Olle Scholar.
