= Şaban Özdemir =

Turkish journalist and tv producer (born 1981)

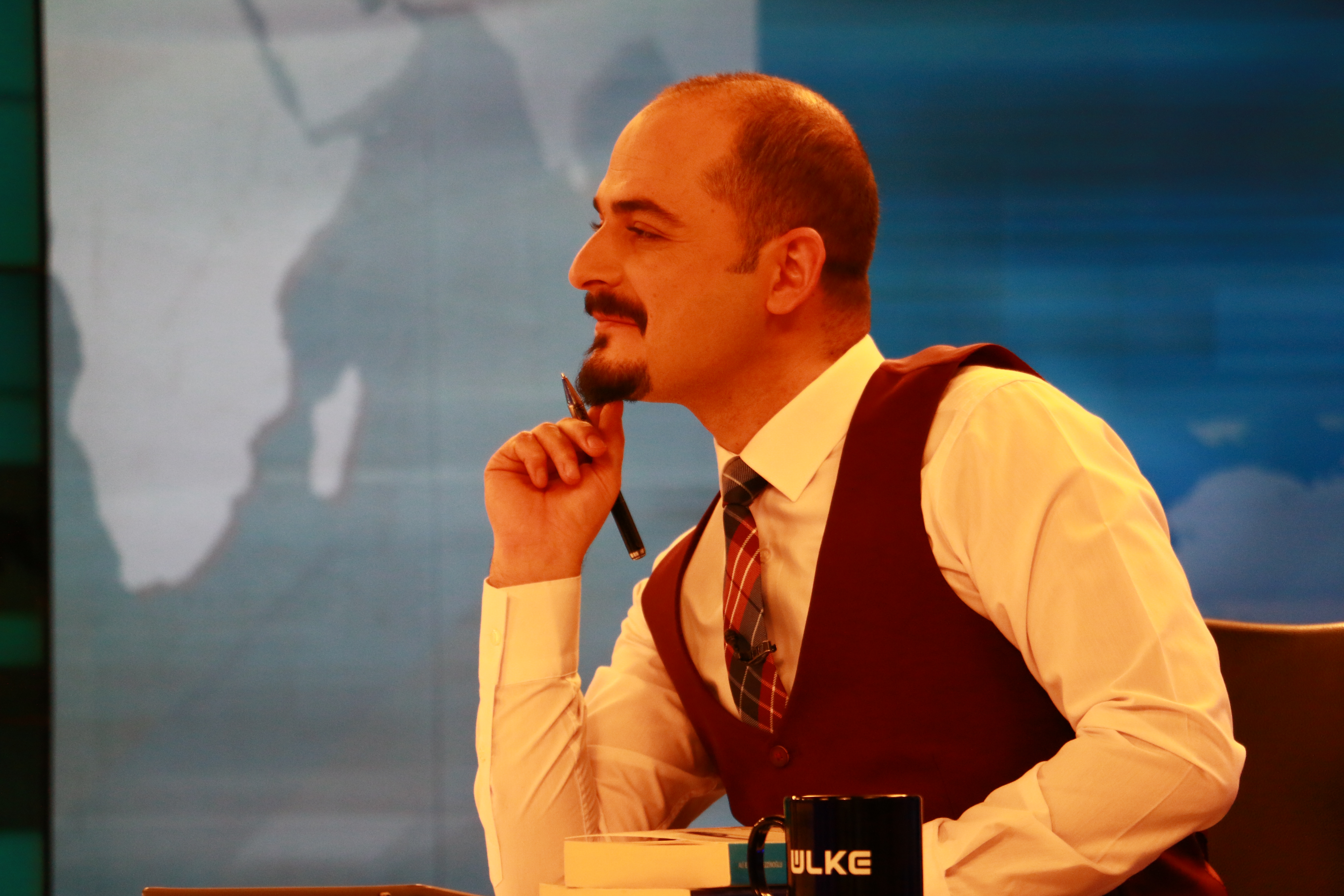
- Özdemir preparing for ULKE TV Pros and Cons tv show
- Born: January 1, 1981 (age 45); Akçaabat, Turkey
- Citizenship: Turkey
- Education: Niğde University, Selçuk University, Marmara University
- Occupations: Journalist, TV Producer, Photographer
- Writing career
- Notable awards: Selçuk Best TV News Award (2005); Turkish Journalists' Association TV Kamera Work Award (2011); Turkish News Cameraman Association Best News Media award (2011); Maviyüzler Kumpanya TV Program Social Responsibility Award (2013)

Şaban Özdemir (born January 1, 1981) is a Turkish journalist and tv producer. The producer and anchorman of Pros Cons and Life is a choice. Since September 2015 he's also the anchorman for Take Care of Yourself health tv show.
