= Father Samuel =

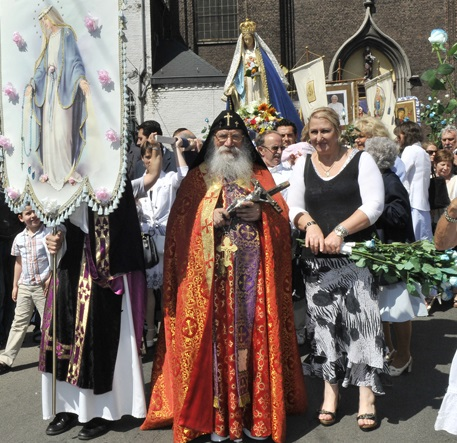
Father Samuel in 2009

Charles-Clément Boniface (born 1942 as Samuel Özdemir), better known as Father Samuel, is a Belgian Syriac Orthodox prelate of Assyrian origin from Turkey, naturalized in the 1970s. A Chorbishop of the Syriac Orthodox Church, he is best known for his eccentricity, his traditionalism, his hostility to Islam and his differences with the Bishopric of Tournai. After being affiliated with the Syriac Catholic Church, in 2020 he returned to his church of origin, the Syriac Orthodox Church.

== Biography ==
=== Background ===
Father Samuel was born in Turkey in 1942. On 29 June 1967, he was ordained a priest of the Syriac Catholic Church at the church of the Patriarchal Seminary of Charfet, by Mrgr. Grégoire Ephrem Jarjour, auxiliary of Patriarch Ignatius Gabriel I Tappouni. He reportedly exercised his ministry in a dozen cities, including Istanbul, before suffering the abuses of his country's authorities, which were hostile to the Christian minority. He then took refuge in Lebanon.

In 1975, when the Lebanese Civil War broke out, he emigrated to Belgium, where he took the name Charles Clément Boniface. He revealed that he rejected the name Özdemir, which had been imposed on his family by the Turks.

=== Ministries in Belgium ===
Recommended by Patriarch Ignatius Antony II Hayyek, he joined the diocese of Tournai and became chaplain of the hospital of Jolimont at La Louvière, then vicar in Gosselies. But, as a traditionalist, he quickly came into conflict with the Vêche from the Tournaisian, whom Paul Beliën explained would be known for his secularization and his progressive. He was then relieved of his duties as early as 1990. His atypical practices, combining psychicism, exorcisms, and healing sessions, continue to be controversial. In 2010, Mrgr. Guy Harpigny threatened by excommunication and called on the faithful of the Latin rite to turn away from it. Finally, in 2011, the bishop hits him with a suspense. On 7 March, however, Father Samuel appealed, in accordance with canon.

Father Samuel has been prosecuted for fraud, illegal celebration of marriage, violation of professional secrecy and illegal exercise of medicine. He was acquitted in 2019.

=== Purchase of a church and a convent ===
In 1990, after Mrgr. Jean Huard, Bishop of Tournai, withdrew his ministry, Father Samuel continued to celebrate the Latin Mass in a hangar in Gosselies.

In 2001, however, he bought the church of Saint Antoine-de-Padoue from Montignies-sur-Sambre from the Franciscans, where he founded a community of nuns, and their library. The inauguration of the church, which took place on 9 December 2001, took place in front of Belgian journalists and politicians, including Jean-Claude Van Cauwenberghe, Minister-President of the Walloon Region, Jacques Van Gompel, Mayor of Charleroi, and Richard Fournaux, Deputy Mayor of Dinant.

Concerning the acquisition of the sixteen and a half million Belgian francs (EUR 410,000) needed to purchase, Father Samuel assured to the newspaper La Libre Belgique that these were above all anonymous donations paid to his association.

== Controversies ==
=== Views on Islam ===
In 2002, in a televised interview, Father Samuel said: "Every Muslim child born in Europe is a time bomb for Western children. They will be persecuted when they are in the minority." He regularly warns of the "Islamic invasion of the West" and claims to have witnessed what the future holds for Europe in Turkey. He adds that "so-called moderate Muslims do not exist".

The Centre for Equal Opportunities then reproached him for having made statements inciting racial hatred and for having disseminated writings going in the same direction, through his book The Angelic Verses. In the case of the public prosecutor's office, acts of incitement to racial hatred were well established and the right to freedom of expression could not be retained. However, in 2010, he was acquitted by the Charleroi Criminal Court, which considered that part of the offence was time-barred and that the other party was not covered by the Moureaux Act.

In 2012 he participated in the international counter-jihad conference in Brussels.

=== Cult status ===
In 1997, the Belgian parliamentary committee on sects drew up a list of 189 movements, including Father Samuel. On a television show, former members accuse him of wanting to break families, having sexually touched adult women, and receiving cash donations.

He is also accused of developing a cult of personality, especially when he staged, mimicking the Passion of Christ, clinging to a cross. Aiming to recall that his parents spoke Aramaic, the language of Christ, he also published his biography in 2002, tinged with hagiography: he would be born, for example, in a stable, like the Infant Jesus, and would have witnessed an appearance of the angel Raphael at the age of six.

At the end of 2014, Father Samuel had yet to defend himself from various accusations before the Charleroi Council Chamber, the investigation being still under way in early 2015.
