= Parvin Darabadi =

Azerbaijani professor of historical sciences (1893–1968)

Parvin Gulam oghlu Darabadi (Azerbaijani: Pərvin Qulam oğlu Darabadi; 28 August 1947 in Baku – 2 February 2017) was a Doctor of Historical Sciences, professor at the International Relations Department, Baku State University.

He is the author of more than 100 scientific, academic-methodological, and scientific-popular works on various problems of military-political history, geopolitics, and conflictology, including the following monographs:

- Voennye problemy politicheskoy istorii Azerbaidzhana nachala XX veka (Military Problems of Azerbaijan's Political History in the Early 20th century) (1991),
- Geopoliticheskoe sopernichestvo v Kaspiiskom regione i Azerbaidzhan (Geopolitical Rivalry in the Caspian Region and Azerbaijan) (2001),
- Geoistoria Kaspiiskogo regiona i geopolitika sovremennosti (Geohistory of the Caspian Region and Geopolitics of the Present Day) (2002),
- Кавказ и Каспий в мировой истории и геополитике XXI века / Kavkaz i Kaspiĭ v mirovoĭ istorii i geopolitike XXI veka, (The Caucasus, and Caspian in world history and 21st century politics) (2010)
