= Parween Hayat =

Pakistani politician

Parveen Hayat (In Arabic/Urdu: پروین حیات) became the first female to serve as city president of the Pakistan People’s Party in Lahore, Pakistan, during the exile of the party leader Benazir Bhutto. She also holds the title of the longest serving female city president since. She exiled herself in London, England in 2002. Although no longer active in politics, unlike her colleagues Naheed Khan and Dr. Safdar Abbasi, she is still recognized as a party elder.
