= Kazan Tatar =

Kazan Tatar may refer to:

- Kazan Tatar dialect
- Kazan Tatars
