= Yasemin Bradley =

Turkish physician (born 1966)

Dr. med. Yasemin Bradley
- Born: Yasemin Özdemir; 1966 (age 59–60)
- Education: Dokuz Eylül University
- Website: www.dryaseminbradley.com

Yasemin Bradley (née Özdemir; born 1966) is a Turkish female physician specialized as a nutritionist and dietitian. She is also a television presenter and writer.

== Biography ==
Born as Yasemin Özdemir, she graduated from the Dokuz Eylül University in İzmir studying medicine. She worked, for a long time, as a prime-time news presenter at the television channel Kanal D. She moved to England and settled there when she was touched much from the destruction of the 1999 İzmit earthquake. In London, she was trained in media production management at the BBC Turkish. She married psychotherapist Anthony Bradley, who inspired her in healthy lifestyle. Upon her spouse's advice, she received education in nutrition and dieting at the alternative therapy school ITEC in London.

Özdemir Bradley translated two books of the renowned American television and radio host Larry King (1929–2012) into Turkish under the title Kiminle Ne Zaman, Nerede, Ne Zaman, Nasıl Konuşmalı (1996), II. Dünya Savaşı Aşk Öyküleri (2002). She authored with her spouse diet food books Gelecek Yiyeceklerde ("The Future is in Food") in 2002, and Bradley Mutfağı ("Bradley's Cuisine") in 2004. She edited the memoirs of a military officer and published it in 2002 under the title Parola: Harbiyeli Aldanmaz ("Password: Cadet does not get taken in"). In 2009, she published a series of three books on child development titled Cemile Doğru Beslenmeyi Öğreniyor ("Cemile Learns How to Eat Healthily"), Cemile Sağlıklı Yaşamayı Öğreniyor ("Cemile Learns How to Live Healthily"), and Cemile Boyu Uzasın İstiyor ("Cemile Wishes To Grow Tall").

In 2012, she started a television program titled Dr. Yasemin Bradley ile Reçetesiz Hayat' ("Life Without Prescription by Dr. Yasemin Bradley") at the channel TRT Haber aired Thursday nights at 21:05 local time.

== Awards and honours ==
She was honored with the "Best Female TV News Presenter 1996" award by the "Tabloid Journalists Association" (Turkish: Magazin Gazetecileri Derneği).

== Works ==
- King, Larry (1996). Kiminle, Ne Zaman, Nerede, Nasıl Konuşmalı (in Turkish). Translated by Yasemin Özdemir Bradley. İnkılâp Kitabevi. p. 192. ISBN 975-101-4069.
- King, Larry (2002-08-08). II. Dünya Savaşı Aşk Öyküleri (in Turkish). Translated by Yasemin Özdemir Bradley. İnkılâp Kitabevi. p. 329. ISBN 975-101-879X.
- Özdemir Bradley, Yasemin; Anthony Bradley (2002-11-22). Gelecek Yiyeceklerde (in Turkish). İnkılâp Kitabevi. p. 261. ISBN 975-101-9281.
- Özdemir Bradley, Yasemin; Anthony Bradley (2004-05-28). Bradley Mutfağı (in Turkish). İnkılâp Kitabevi. p. 184. ISBN 975-102-1537.
- Bradley, Yasemin (2009-12-23). Cemile Doğru Beslenmeyi Öğreniyor (in Turkish). Kaknüs Yayınları. p. 24. ISBN 978-975-256-2776.
- Bradley, Yasemin (2009-12-23). Cemile Sağlıklı Yaşamayı Öğreniyor (in Turkish). Kaknüs Yayınları. p. 24. ISBN 978-975-256-2790.
- Bradley, Yasemin (2009-12-23). Cemile Boyu Uzasın İstiyor (in Turkish). Kaknüs Yayınları. p. 24. ISBN 978-975-256-2783.
