= Şenay Duzcu =

Turkish-German comedian

- Born: Turkey
- Occupation: Stand-up comedian

Şenay Duzcu is a Turkish-German stand-up comedian. She is often referred to as "Germany's first female German-Turkish stand-up comedian".

== Comedian career ==
Duzcu admits that she was restricted as a child by her parents, and at school, she was very reserved and never wanted to attract attention because that was expected from a Turkish girl. During a job as a tour leader at an art exhibition, she discovered her talent for inspiring ordinary people while telling stories and anecdotes. She initially planned to become an actress. However, her father did not allow it. She pursued a career as a full-time stand-up comedian, after she reached the final in the comedy category in the talent show "Star-Search" in 2003. Television appearances in "Night Wash", "Ladies Night", "Comedy Tower" and "Nuhr im Ersten" followed. She is often referred to as "Germany's first female German-Turkish stand-up comedian". Beside holding on-stage comedy shows in theaters at various cities, she also appears on many radio and television programs.

Duzcu talks about German/Turkish cultural differences with heart-warming humor. She explains the relations of first-generation Turks with Germans in a humorous way, using examples from her parents. She adds that Turkish humor thrives more on imitating people, on slapstick and physicality, while German humor uses more word play. She tries to mirror both cultures through her comedy. She also believes that seminars are not useful for the integration of immigrants, and empathy is more important. She says "I am not a diplomat or a politician. But if the work I do provides this additionally, that's a good thing." Wearing a red free-hanging short skirt, she starts her show on stage introducing herself as being from Turkey, from the fourth-largest city, Duisburg. She says that "the Turk in me is always late for work, but on the other hand, the German in me always finishes on time!"

== Personal life ==
Born in Turkey, Şenay Duzcu was brought to Duisburg, Germany at three years of age by her immigrant parents. She grew up in Düsseldorf. Diagnosed with dyslexia, reading and spelling weaknesses, she was sent to a low-level Hauptschule for secondary education. After finishing high school at 19, she received a scholarship for intellectually gifted students during her study of architecture in Dortmund, and earned a diploma. She later started graphic design studies. She lived for a while in Essen. She emphasizes that London, where she worked as an au pair, as well as Berkeley, California and Ankara, Turkey, where she stayed for a semester during her university education, influenced her. Currently, she resides in Nippes, Cologne.

== Awards ==
In 2007, Duzcu received the "Deutsch-Türkischer Freundschaftspreis" ("German-Turkish Friendship Prize").
