= Cem Özdemir (footballer) =

Turkish footballer

Personal information
- Date of birth: 27 July 1992 (age 34)
- Place of birth: Seyhan, Adana, Turkey
- Height: 1.80 m (5 ft 11 in)
- Positions: Winger; midfielder

Team information
- Current team: Isparta 32 SK
- Number: 8

Youth career
- 2006–2009: Seyhan Belediyespor
- 2009–2010: Adanaspor

Senior career*
Years	Team	Apps	(Gls)
2010–2017	Adanaspor	108	(11)
2017–2020	Sivasspor	0	(0)
2018	→ Kardemir Karabükspor (loan)	8	(0)
2019	→ Manisa BB (loan)	19	(3)
2020–2021	Vanspor	8	(0)
2021	Fethiyespor	11	(0)
2021–2022	Adanaspor	15	(0)
2022–2023	Isparta 32 SK	31	(1)
2023	Etimesgutspor	1	(0)
2023–2024	Isparta 32 SK	8	(1)
2024	Erciyes 38 FSK	7	(0)
2024–2025	Polatlı 1926 SK	6	(0)
2025–	Isparta 32 SK	21	(1)

International career^{‡}
2010	Turkey U20	1	(0)
- * Club domestic league appearances and goals as of 29 November 2025 ‡ National team caps and goals as of 26 May 2018

Cem Özdemir (born 27 July 1992) is a Turkish footballer who plays for TFF Second League club Isparta 32 SK.

Cem made one appearance for Turkey national under-20 football team, in a 1–0 win over the Ukraine U20s.
