= Özgür Özdemir =

Turkish footballer (born 1995)

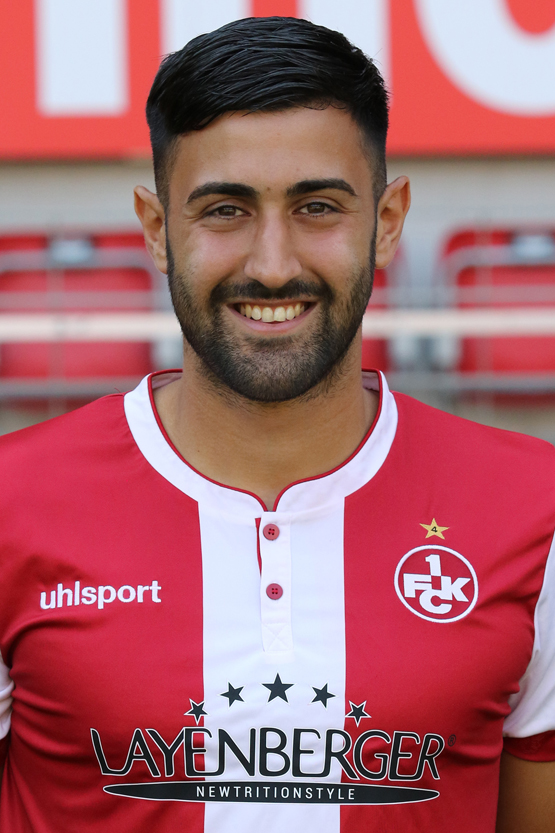
- Özdemir in 2018

Personal information
- Date of birth: 10 January 1995 (age 31)
- Place of birth: Frankfurt, Germany
- Height: 1.88 m (6 ft 2 in)
- Position: Defender

Team information
- Current team: Amasyaspor FK
- Number: 6

Youth career
- –2009: FSV Frankfurt
- 2009–2014: Eintracht Frankfurt

Senior career*
Years	Team	Apps	(Gls)
2014–2016	1. FC Nürnberg II	49	(2)
2014–2016	1. FC Nürnberg	0	(0)
2016–2017	SV Ried	32	(0)
2017–2018	Sonnenhof Großaspach	24	(2)
2018–2019	1. FC Kaiserslautern	3	(0)
2019–2020	Adanaspor	5	(1)
2020–2021	Sonnenhof Großaspach	13	(0)
2021–2023	Turgutluspor	30	(1)
2023	Bayrampaşa	13	(1)
2023–	Amasyaspor FK	20	(1)

International career
2011	Turkey U16	4	(0)
2011–2012	Turkey U17	7	(0)
2013–2014	Turkey U19	4	(0)
2015	Turkey U20	3	(0)
2014–2016	Turkey U21	5	(0)
- * Club domestic league appearances and goals as of 03:51, 4 July 2024 (UTC)

Özgür Özdemir (born 10 January 1995) is a Turkish professional footballer who plays as a defender for TFF Third League club Amasyaspor FK.

== Club career ==
In September 2019, Özdemir joined Adanaspor. In January 2020 it was confirmed, that he had left the club by mutual consent.

He returned to Sonnenhof Großaspach in July 2020.

== International career ==
Özdemir was born in Germany to Turkish parents, and is a youth international for the Turkish Football Federation.
