= Rowena Bali =

Mexican writer

Rowena Bali (born 1977) is a Mexican writer.

Bali studied dance, drama and pantomime in the Instituto Nacional de Bellas Artes y Literatura in Mexico City. She studied Spanish language and literature at the National Autonomous University of Mexico and Universidad de Guanajuato.

== Selected works ==
- El agente Morboso
- La herida en el cielo
- El Ejército de Sodoma
- La bala enamorada
- Hablando de Gerzon
- Amazon party
- Tina o el misterio

=== Storybook ===
- De vanidades y divinidades

=== Poetry ===
- Voto de indecisión
