= Ibrahim ibn Bali =

15th-century Mamluk official and writer

Ibrahim ibn Bali was a 15th-century Mamluk official and writer from Aintab who authored the Turkish masnavi Hikmetname in 1488. He served Qaitbay (r. 1468–96) as his ambassador to Bayezid II of the Ottoman Empire (r. 1481–1512) in Constantinople. He claimed to be a friend of the Mamluk Sultan Al-Mansur Fakhr al-Din Uthman (r. 1453) and attended his funeral in Damietta. His masnavi contains 12573 bayts, which he claimed to be 13000. He dedicated his work to Qaitbay. In his Hikmatnama, he was at an old age and wanted to author a Fetihname (declaration of victory), which remains undiscovered.

== Bibliography ==
- Kutlar Oğuz, Fatma Sabiha (27 February 2014). "İbni Bâlî". Türk Edebiyatı Eserler Sözlüğü. Ahmet Yesevi University. ISBN 978-9944-237-86-4.
