= Turan Manafzade =

Azerbaijani musician

- Born: 25 May 1991 (age 34); Baku, Azerbaijan SSR, Soviet Union
- Citizenship: Republic of Azerbaijan; Republic of Turkiye
- Occupations: Pianist; Conductor; Composer

Turan Islam gizi Manafzade (born 25 May 1991) is an Azerbaijani pianist, conductor and composer. In 2017, she received the title of Honored Artist of the Republic of Azerbaijan.

== Early life ==
Turan Manafzadeh was born in Baku in 1991. His father is the famous Azerbaijani pianist, Islam Manafov. She received her initial music education at the Absheron Children's Music School and was admitted to the State Conservatory of the Mimar Sinan Fine Arts University in 2003.

== Creativity ==
Turan Manafzadeh has performed concerts in Austria, Germany, Romania, Northern Cyprus, Azerbaijan, Turkey, and Uzbekistan, among other countries. In 2012, she went through the selection stages of the International Summer Music Academy held annually in Salzburg, Austria, and had the opportunity to collaborate with pianist Dimitri Bashkirov. In 2012, she completed her piano studies under the guidance of Professor Nurferi Onur at the State Conservatory of Memar Sinan University in Istanbul, Turkey. In 2013, she participated in masterclasses by Tamara Poddubnaya and Boris Petrushansky. In April 2013, Turan Manafzadeh, along with her older brother Abuzar Manafzadeh, organized an 18-concert program in Azerbaijan within a span of two weeks. In 2014, she joined the conducting department of the State Conservatory of Memar Sinan University, where she received education under the guidance of Antonio Pirolli and Naci Özgüç, eventually graduating in 2019. In February 2015, she, along with her brother Abuzar Manafzadeh and father Islam Manafov, performed a family tribute concert during the "Khojaly Massacre Commemoration Ceremony" organized by the European Azerbaijan Society in Istanbul.

In July 2017, she served as a guest conductor for the Silk Road Orchestra in the Northern Cyprus Turkish Republic during the "International 3rd Silk Road Music Conference." During these concerts, she conducted works by Azerbaijani composers such as Gara Garayev, Xatire Ahmadli Jafar, and Hesen Ucarsu. In August 2017, she participated in conducting masterclasses in Izmir, Turkey, led by conductor Rengim Gökmen. Out of 35 participants, she was one of six chosen to conduct the Karşıyaka Chamber Orchestra (KODA).

In May 2018, she conducted the performance of G. F. Handel's "Apollo and Daphne" at the Istanbul State Opera and Ballet. The same year, in collaboration with the State Committee on Diaspora Affairs, she organized the "Khojaly Commemoration Concert" in Amsterdam. In January 2019, she was invited as a conductor to the "New Year's Concert" held in Vienna's "Muth" concert hall, along with Abuzar Manafzadeh. In September 2019, in Vienna's Azerbaijani Cultural Center, she performed a piano concert with her family. In November 2019, together with her family, she gave a special piano concert at the TANAP opening ceremony, attended by the President of the Republic of Azerbaijan, Ilham Aliyev, and the President of the Republic of Turkey, Recep Tayyip Erdoğan.

In the same year, she was invited as a conductor to perform concerts in Baku and conducted the world's first Balaban Concerto, composed by Abuzar Manafzade for the balaban musical instrument. In December 2020, upon the invitation of the World Turkish Business Council (DTİK), she held a special friendship concert as the Cultural Ambassador at the European Parliament.

The march she composed for the 100th anniversary of the founding of the Republic of Turkey quickly gained popularity and received widespread acclaim in Turkey.

== See also ==
- Nargiz Aliyarova
