= R. Paramashivan =

- Origin: India
- Occupation(s): Singer, instrumentalist, composer

R. Paramashivan is an Indian musician and director associated with Karnataka theatre. Paramashivan works as a singer, instrumentalist, and composer. He was awarded the Sangeet Natak Akademi Award for theatre music in 2005.
