= Şenay Özdemir =

Dutch publisher, journalist

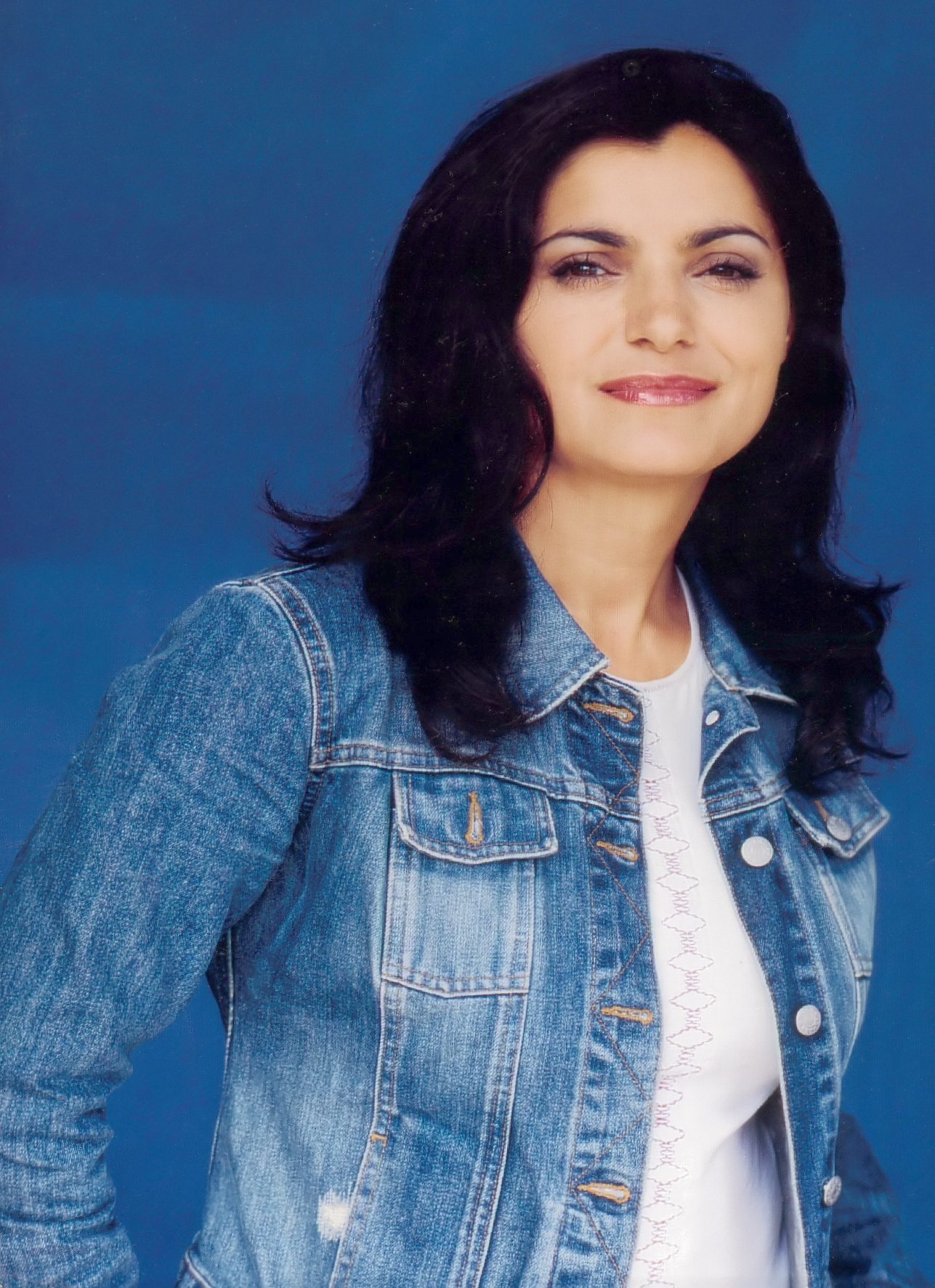
- Şenay Özdemir (2012)
- Born: 18 May 1969 (age 57); Safranbolu, Turkey
- Education: French, English language and literature
- Children: 1

Şenay Özdemir (born 18 May 1969) is a Dutch television presenter, broadcaster, writer and women's rights advocate of Turkish origin.

== Career in media ==
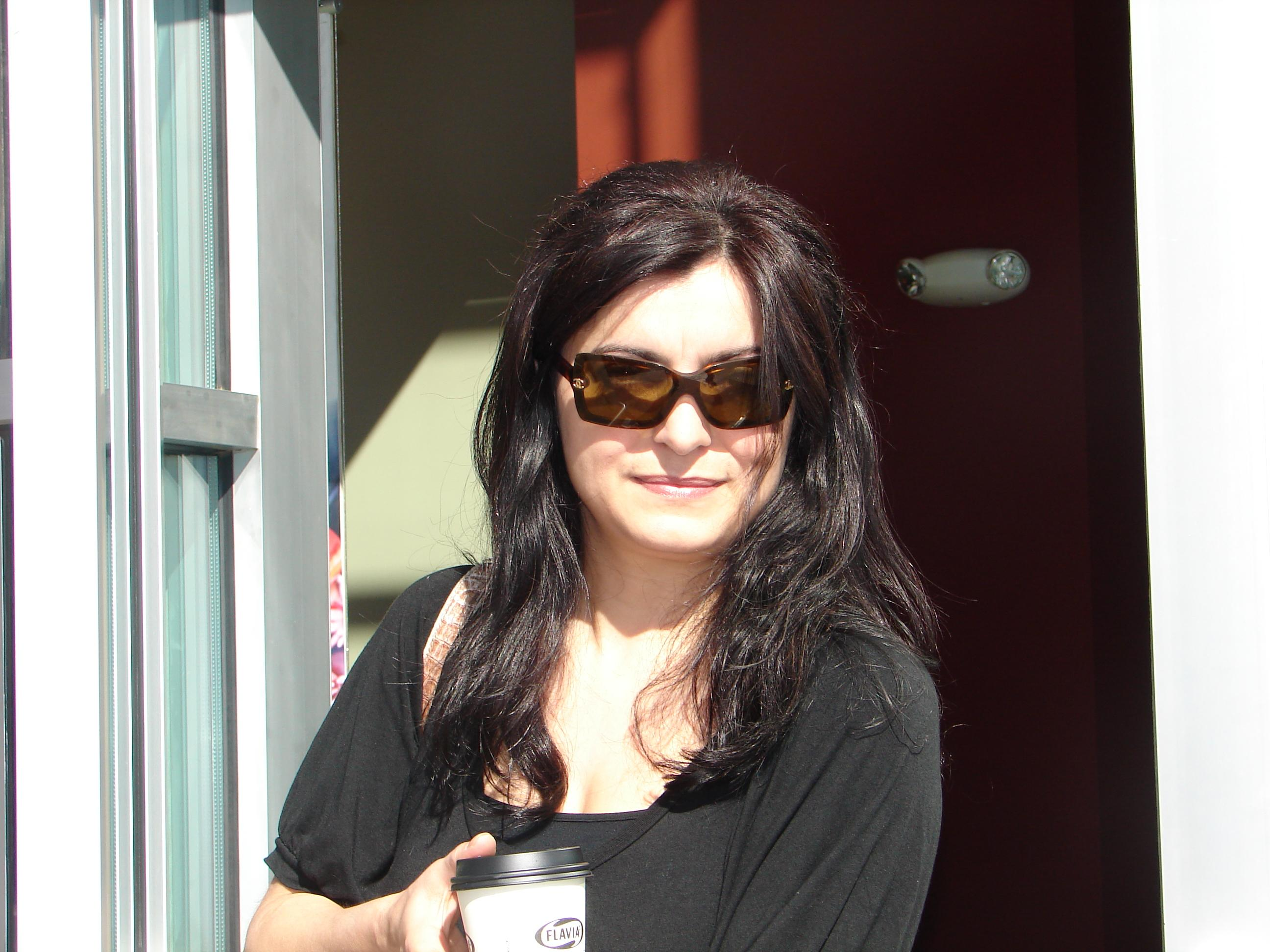
Şenay Özdemir at a coffee shop in Austin, Texas

At the age of 22, Özdemir signed a contract with TROS (Dutch: Televisie Radio Omroep Stichting), the largest Dutch broadcast organization, to work as the first Turkish television presenter in the Netherlands and Europe. She later became news producer at the same organization.

She founded the monthly-magazine SEN, a glossy for Mediterranean women in the Netherlands. She was honored with the ASN Bank Media Prize. The magazine was named Best New Women's Magazine of the Year by the Dutch daily de Volkskrant in 2004. The magazine started to appear in digital version only on the internet as "www.senmagazine.com" in 2007. She published columns and articles in the NRC Handelsblad, de Volkskrant and Los Angeles Times. In and outside the Netherlands, she was seen as an experienced expert in the field of women's emancipation and bicultural society.

In the beginning of December 2008, Őzdemir, together with her ten-year-old son, left for Austin, Texas, United States. At the invitation of the University of Texas School of Journalism, she started working as a guest lecturer in Online Publishing.

She interviewed many notable people, among whom were the Dutch prime minister Jan Peter Balkenende, Miss World 2002 Azra Akın, topmodel Frederique van der Wal, Dutch parliamentarian Geert Wilders, publicist Paul Scheffer, scholar Marion van San and world's youngest CEO Suhas Gopinath.

== Women's rights activist ==
She is often asked to comment on topics such as the integration of immigrants and the emancipation of Muslims. In March 2006, she was a jury member of the Prague International Human Rights Documentary Film Festival, where she judged forty films. At the end of that year in December, Özdemir attended the first Women's Islamic Initiative in Spirituality and Equality (WISE) conference in New York City, where she was invited as one of a hundred influential Muslim women from around the world. In June 2007, she spoke at the International Congress of Women in Bangalore, India. She was a board member of the Social Platform Rotterdam, on the "Part-time Plus Taskforce" and "Women-on-Top".

In the spring of 2010, she was appointed Senior Fellow of the Osgood Center for International Studies in Washington, D.C., which requires her to regularly commute back and forth between the Netherlands and the US. On 16 December 2010, she gave a speech at the renowned American think tank Woodrow Wilson International Center for Scholars.

On 8 March 2011, International Women's Day, Őzdemir announced in the Netherlands via Twitter that she would be returning to the US from the summer to work at the University of Texas.

In 2018, during her time at the University of Texas, Özdemir served her friends a mediterranean meal with Turkish wine, which she could not find locally. That led her to found and lead the international multi-day event "Women in Wine Expo" (WIWE), which aims to connect women working in wine worldwide.

== Commentaries on her activities ==
According to the International Herald Tribune and The New York Times, Özdemir belongs to "A new generation of Muslim women". The American media Foreign Policy and Austin American-Statesman wrote that "Özdemir may be more successful with her activities than many Dutch government programs". She was also praised in her own country: In 2005, she was called "a top female" in Het Parool, and she took part in television talk shows such as 'Pauw & Witteman, Het Elfde Uur and Rondom Tien om on themes such as the "emancipation and integration of Muslim women". In January 2009, the free newspaper De Pers called her "the most glamorous Muslim woman in the Netherlands", based on her fashionable lifestyle. The article makes a comparison with Carrie Bradshaw from the American women's series Sex and the City, because her first book De Harsclub ("The Waxclub"), published in June 2009, is a chick lit novel about the lifestyle of three modern Mediterranean women in the Netherlands.

== Personal life ==
Şenay Özdemir was born in Safranbolu, in northwestern Anatolia, Turkey as the daughter of Turkish parents on 18 May 1969. In 1976, her father who was a teacher in Turkey, emigrated to the Netherlands. She studied French and English language and literature, graduaring in 1989.

Özdemir is married for the second time, and has a son, Hakan, born in 1998.
