= Özdemir Turan =

Turkish acrobat

Özdemir Turan (born January 21, 1950) is a Turkish acrobat. He began his career in 1962 as one of the first Turkish performers of acrobatics. He was taught by Selim Oktulmuş from Salonika.

== Background ==
Turan was born in Istanbul. In 1957, at the age of seven, he attended acrobatic festivals in Istanbul and took an interest in the subject. The following year, he met the acrobat Selim Oktulmus in Taksim Square, and expressed his own desire to be an acrobat. However, Oktulmus did not accept him as a student because he did not believe that Turan was skilled enough. By 1967, Turan had become a prominent acrobat. For the first time, he worked in the Istanbul Circle. In 1970, he went to Europe and became a successful acrobat there. In the 1990s, he worked exclusively in Turkey, taking part in various festivals. He currently works in dentistry, but still performs as an acrobat.
