= Turan Özdemir =

Turkish actor

Turan Özdemir (born 11 October 1952, Muğla – 15 January 2018, Istanbul) was a Turkish actor and voice actor. In 2006, he received the Best Actor Award at the 13th Golden Boll Film Festival for his role in the movie Donut Gaymak.

== Selected filmography ==
| Year | Title | Role | Notes |
|---|---|---|---|
| 2001 | Tatlı Hayat | | |
| 2003 | Ekmek Teknesi | | |
| 2003 | Valley of the Wolves (TV series) | | |
| 2004 | Cennet Mahallesi | | |
| 2004 | Kadın İsterse | | |
| 2005 | Ice Cream, I Scream | | |
| 2007 | Mavi Gözlü Dev | | |
| 2007 | Adam and the Devil | | |
| 2010 | Geniş Aile | | |
| 2011 | Pis Yedili (dizi) | | |
| 2017 | Kiraz Mevsimi | | |
