= Suhas Gopinath =

Indian entrepreneur (born 1986)

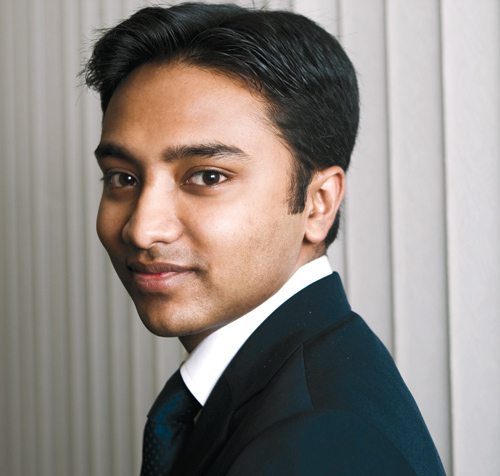
- Born: 4 November 1986 (age 40); Bangalore, Karnataka, India
- Occupation: Entrepreneur

Suhas Gopinath (born 4 November 1986 in Bangalore) is an Indian entrepreneur. He is the founder, CEO, and Chairman of Globals Inc., a multinational IT company. He became CEO at the age of 17, three years after founding the company. In 2017, he founded the start-up ShopsUp.

== Early life ==
Gopinath was born in Bangalore in the Indian state of Karnataka. His father is a defense scientist. He taught himself to make websites with the help of books, and created his first at the age of 14. He incorporated his company Globals Inc., the same year, in 2000. He became CEO of his company at the age of 17. He was thought to be, for a time, the youngest CEO of a company.

== Recognition ==
- In 2005, Gopinath was the youngest among the 175 recipients of Karnataka's Rajyotsava Award.
- On 2 December 2007, The European Parliament and International Association for Human Values conferred "Young Achiever Award" to Gopinath at the European Parliament, Brussels.
- In November 2008, he was invited to represent the World Bank's ICT Leadership Roundtable for adopting ICT in Africa to increase employability and fostering ICT skills in students from these countries.
- He was announced as "Young Global Leader" for 2008–2009 by the World Economic Forum, Davos. In that position he would be involved in development programs across the world. He holds a diploma on global leadership and public policy from the John F. Kennedy School of Government and Harvard University.
