= Turan G. Bali =

American economist

Turan G. Bali is a Turkish-American economist, currently the Robert S. Parker Chair Professor of Business Administration at McDonough School of Business, Georgetown University, and previously the David Krell Chair Professor of Finance at Baruch College.
