= Pervin Özdemir =

Turkish ceramics artist

Pervin Özdemir (born 1951 in İzmir) is a Turkish ceramics artist.

She has taken drawing and history of art classes from Ali Riza Hiti. Has completed academy in 1971. In the 1980s she continued her art studies concentrating on ceramics at the Museum of Paintings and Sculpture in İzmir. In 1996, she completed studies in a ceramics workshop in Gelsenkirchen, Germany, and researches in Köln and Amsterdam. Published articles on art of ceramics. During the same period, started to train students in the workshop she founded.

She has prepared 25 solo exhibitions in many cities of Turkey and in Germany. Took part in 55 joint exhibitions all around the world. Her ceramics exhibition in Gelsenkirchen which was the first one by a Turkish artist was mentioned in European press.

Her works can be found in many collections all around the world, including Germany, the Netherlands, England, Switzerland, Austria, Hungary, the US, Italy, Sweden, Australia, Japan, France.

She acted as the art consultant at the Art Gallery of Ephesos Museum for 7 years.

She opened a solo modern ceramics exhibition in Urfa, which was a first in South-Eastern Turkey.

Awarded with a first honorable mention (1991) and first jury award (1994) at Golden Cruse Art Competition.

Won the Halikarnas Balikcisi Award of Service to the Anatolian Civilizations by the Turkish Ministry of Culture.

The Turgut Pura Foundation have named their art prizes after her.

She currently teaches at İzmir Guzelyali Cultural Center.
