= List of overtone musicians =

This is a list of musicians and musical groups utilizing some form of overtone singing.

== Traditional ==
These are musicians using a traditional method of overtone singing: Overtone singing originates among the people in the Urankhai region of Siberia, who have historic links to Mongols (although they might speak Turkic languages, like Tuvans).

=== Turkic and Mongols ===
- Bukhchuluun Ganburged
- Kaigal-ool Khovalyg of Huun-Huur-Tu
- Sayan Bapa of Huun-Huur-Tu
- Kongar-ool Ondar featured in Genghis Blues and work with Bela Fleck & The Flecktones
- Okna Tsahan Zam from Kalmykia
- Igor Koshkendey from Chirgilchin
- Mongun-Ool Ondar from Chirgilchin
- Hosoo
- Andrei Mongush
- Vladimir Oidupaa
- Albert Kuvezin of Yat-Kha (formerly Huun-Huur-Tu)
- Saidash Mongush
- Enkhjargal Dandarvaanchig, also known as Epi
- Sainkho Namtchylak
- Batzorig Vaanchig of Khusugtun
- Dorjnyam Shinetsog-Geni of Domog
- Dashzeveg Munkhsaikhan and Baatar Tsogbayar of Jonon
- Galbadrakh "Gala" Tsendbaatar, Nyamjantsan "Jaya" Galsanjamts, Enkhsaikhan "Enkush" Batjargal of "The HU"

==== Groups ====
- Alash Ensemble
- Altai Kai
- Altai Khairkhan from Mongolia
- Chirgilchin
- Huun-Huur-Tu
- Khusugtun
- Tuvan National Orchestra
- Tyva Kyzy
- Yat-Kha
- The Hu

=== Others ===
- Paul Pena from San Francisco featured on Genghis Blues
- Nils-Aslak Valkeapää Yoik singer from Finland
- Fátima Miranda
- Soriah
- Rowan Lee Hartsuiker Dutch throat singer

== Non-traditional ==
- Michael Vetter
- Avi Kaplan – Bass singer and vocal percussionist, formerly in Pentatonix
- Anna-Maria Hefele
- Guy Mendilow – composer, show-creator, uses western overtone singing in multimedia productions like The Forgotten Kingdom
- Theo Bleckmann – featured in composer John Hollenbeck's composition The Music of Life
- Arrington de Dionyso of Old Time Relijun
- Diamanda Galás – Greek-American performance artist and renowned vocalist; when performing an opera by Vinko Globokar she had to produce four tones at once
- Ilaria Orefice – Italian (Sardinia) singer and vocal researcher published on Pubmed and The Journal Of Voice, vocalist in the Nordic Folk band Nebala
- Demetrio Stratos – Italian singer of Greek and Egyptian origin, explored overtone singing, diplophony, triplophony with Area and in his solo records, in particular Cantare la voce
- Luca Atzori - Italian actor and vocal researcher.
- Tran Quang Hai – Vietnamese overtone singer, researcher on Mongolian khoomei in France in 1969
