= List of Tuvans =

This is a partial list of notable Tuvan people.

== Military personnel ==
- Kidispey Choodu
- Sergey Shoigu

== Politicians ==
- Sholban Kara-ool
- Donduk Kuular
- Kaadyr-ool Bicheldey
- Khertek Anchimaa-Toka
- Larisa Shoigu
- Salchak Toka
- Sherig-ool Oorzhak
- Vladislav Khovalyg

== Singers ==
- Kaigal-ool Khovalyg
- Albert Kuvezin
- Maxim Munzuk
- Sainkho Namtchylak
- Kongar-ol Ondar
- Aldyn-ool Sevek
- Gennadi Tumat
- Oidupaa Vladimir Oyun

== Writers ==
- Mongush Kenin-Lopsan
- Galsan Tschinag
