= Throat singing =

Vocal practice

Throat singing refers to several vocal practices found in different cultures worldwide. These vocal practices are generally associated with a certain type of guttural voice that contrasts with the most common types of voices employed in singing, which are usually represented by chest (modal) and head (light, or falsetto) registers. Throat singing is often described as evoking the sensation of more than one pitch at a time, meaning that the listener perceives two or more distinct musical notes while the singer is producing a single vocalization.

Throat singing consists of a range of singing techniques that originally belonged to particular cultures and which may share sound characteristics, making them noticeable by other cultures and users of mainstream singing styles.

== Terminology ==
Throat singing is characteristic of the Turkic peoples (Tuvans, Tofalars, Altai, Khakass, Yakuts, Kazakhs, Kyrgyz), Mongolic peoples (Mongols, Buryats, Kalmyks) and Tungus-Manchu peoples (Evenks, Evens). The term originates from the translation of the Tuvan word Xöömei and the Mongolian word Xöömi, which mean throat and guttural, respectively. Ethnic groups from Mongolia, Russia, Japan, South Africa, Canada, Italy, China and India, among other countries, accept and normally employ the term throat singing to describe their way of producing voice, song and music.

Throat Singing by German Band Cradem Aventure ("The Last Ostrogoths") at the Ritterfestspiele Bad Bentheim.

The term throat singing is not precise, because any singing technique involves sound generation in the "throat", with the voice being produced at the level of the larynx, which includes the vocal folds and other structures. Therefore it would be, in principle, admissible to refer to classical operatic singing or pop singing as "throat singing". However, the term throat is not accepted as a part of the official terminology of anatomy (Terminologia Anatomica) and is not technically associated with most of the singing techniques.

Some authors, performers, coaches, and listeners associate throat singing with overtone singing. Throat singing and overtone singing are not synonyms, contrary to what is indicated by some dictionaries (an example being Britannica); however, in some cases, both aspects may be present, such as in the khargyraa technique from Tuva, which uses a deep, tense voice, along with overtone singing.

"Singing with the throat" may be regarded as a demeaning expression to some singers, since it may imply that the singer is using a high level of effort, resulting in a forced or non-suitable voice. The word "throaty" is usually associated with a rough, raspy, breathy or hoarse voice. Despite being a term frequently used in the literature starting in the 1960s, some contemporary scholars tend to avoid using throat singing as a general term.

There is an international reception for concerts and workshops given by musical groups belonging to the several cultures that incorporate throat singing. Besides the traditional ethnic performances, throat singing has also been explored by musicians belonging to contemporary, rock, new-age, pop, and independent music genres.

== Types of throat singing ==
Throat singing techniques may be classified under an ethnomusicological approach, which considers cultural aspects, their associations to rituals, religious practices, storytelling, labor songs, vocal games, and other contexts; or a musical approach, which considers their artistic use, the basic acoustical principles, and the physiological and mechanical procedures to learn, train and produce them.

The most commonly referenced types of throat singing techniques in musicological and ethnomusicological texts are generally associated with ancient cultures. Some of them, as the Khöömei from Mongolia, Tuva and China, and the Canto Tenore from Sardinia, are acknowledged by UNESCO as Intangible Cultural Heritage.

- Mongolian throat singing and Tuvan throat singing is a form of singing comprising several techniques; it is practiced in Mongolia and the Republic of Tuva, belonging to the Russian Federation, and in China.
- Buddhist chants, found in some monasteries in India (Tibetan exiled communities) and Tibet, sometimes involve vocal-ventricular phonation; that is, combined vibrations of the vocal folds and the ventricular folds, achieving low pitches.
- Inuit throat singing is a type of duet used in contests; it is practiced by the Inuit of Canada.
- Rekuhkara is a practice formerly done by the Ainu ethnic group of Hokkaidō Island, Japan.
- Canto a tenore, or Sardinian throat singing, is found in Sardinia. A similar polyphonic singing in Corsica known as Paghjella exists, however it doesn't involve throat singing.

In musically related terms, throat singing refers to the following specific techniques, among others:

- Overtone singing, also known as overtone chanting, or harmonic singing. This is the singing style more commonly associated with throat singing.
- Undertone singing, which involves techniques that comprise subharmonics. It is generated by the combined vibrations of parts of the singing apparatus at a certain frequency and frequencies that correspond to integer divisions of such frequency, such as 1:2, 1:3, and 1:4 ratios.
- Diplophonic voice, which includes techniques that consist of parts of the singing apparatus vibrating at non-integer ratios and which are usually regarded as associated with pathological processes.
- Growl voice consists of a technique of growling, which employs structures of the vocal apparatus located above the larynx, vibrating at the same time as the vocal folds, particularly the aryepiglottic folds.
- Vocal fry is a technique associated to vocal fry register.

== Audio examples ==
- Kargyraa.mp3
- Khoomei.mp3
- Sound samples, by Leonardo Fuks, at the Royal Institute of Technology, Sweden.

== See also ==
- Tuvan throat singing
- List of overtone musicians
- Cantu a tenore
