= Tuvans =

Siberian Turkic ethnic group

тывалар
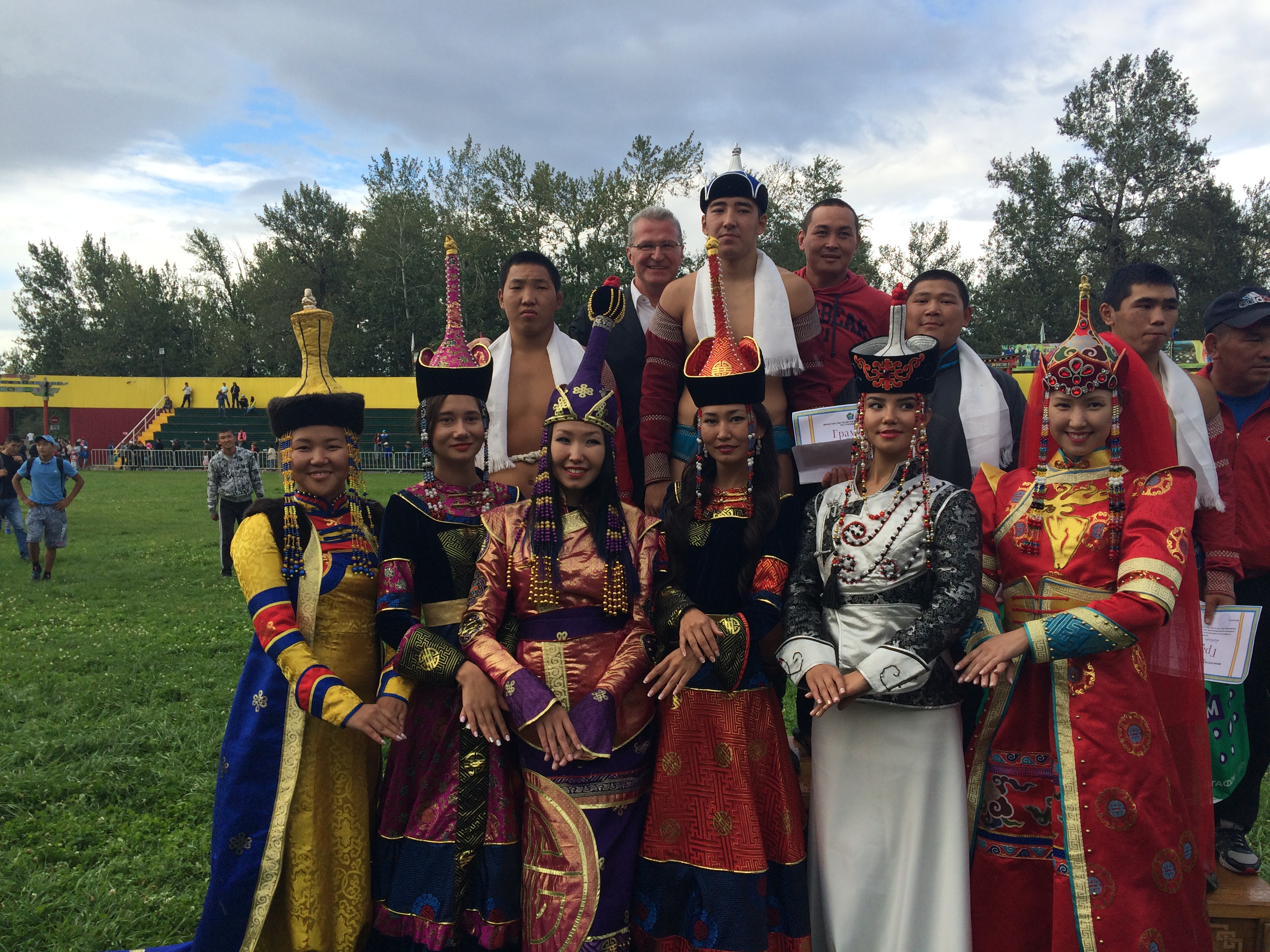
- Tuvans in Russia

Total population
- c. 312,194
- Russia: 295,384 (2021)
- ∟Tuva: 279,789 (7,189 Todjins)
- ∟Krasnoyarsk Krai: 2,719
- ∟Khakassia: 2,051
- ∟Novosibirsk Oblast: 1,308
- ∟Buryatia: 1,124
- China: 14,456 (2021 est.)
- Mongolia: 2,354 (2020 est.)

Languages
- Tuvan (L1); Russian; Mongolian; Chinese

Religion
- Predominantly Tibetan Buddhism (Lamaism), Tengrism

Related ethnic groups
- Altaians, Chulyms, Siberian Tatars, Kumandins, Shors, Teleuts, Tofalar, Dukha, Soyot, Kyrgyz, and other Turkic peoples

- People: Тывалар (Tyvalar)
- Language: Тыва дыл (Tyva dyl)
- Country: Тыва (Tyva)

The Tuvans (from Russian тувинцы tuvincy) or Tyvans (from Tuvan тывалар tyvalar) are a Turkic ethnic group indigenous to Siberia that live in Tuva, Mongolia, and China. They speak the Tuvan language, a Siberian Turkic language. In Mongolia, they are regarded as one of the Uriankhai peoples. In China, they are considered Mongols, even though Tuvans are Turkic, not Mongolic.

Tuvans have historically been livestock-herding nomads, tending to herds of goats, sheep, camels, reindeer, cattle, and yaks for the past thousands of years (This is, in fact, evident in the Tuvan folk song "Tooruktug Dolgai Tangdym"). They have traditionally lived in yurts covered by felt or chums, layered with birch bark or hide that they relocate seasonally as they move to newer pastures. Traditionally, the Tuvans were divided into nine regions called khoshuun, namely the Tozhu, Salchak, Oyunnar, Khemchik, Khaasuut, Shalyk, Nibazy, Daavan and Choodu, and Beezi. The first four were ruled by Uriankhai Mongol princes, while the rest were administered by Borjigin Mongol princes.

== History ==
Tuvan Republic

Besides prehistoric rock-carvings to be found especially along the Yenisei banks, the first internationally important archaeological findings have been near Arzhan, in the north central Tuva. Here, Scythian kurgan burials are being researched, revealing the earliest (7th, 6th century BC) and easternmost remains of these people who spread from Central Asia and predate Turcomongol tribes. Their story and artifacts can be viewed in the National Museum in Kyzyl.

The Xiongnu ruled over the area of Tuva prior to 200 AD. At this time, a people known to the Chinese as Dingling 丁零 inhabited the region. Chinese chroniclers further associated the Dingling with the Tiele, one of whose tribes was named Dubo (都波) and was located in the eastern Sayans. The word tuwa also occurs three times in the Inscription of Hüis Tolgoi. While it is not clear what it means, Dieter Maue suggested that it could be related to the tribal name "Dubo". This name is recognized as being associated with the Tuvan people and is the earliest written record of them. The Xianbei 鮮卑 (descendants of the Donghu 東胡, once conquered by the Xiongnu) attacked and defeated the Xiongnu and they, in turn, were defeated by the Rouran 柔然. From around the end of the 6th century, the Göktürks held dominion over Tuvans (Doubo 都播), who constituted one of the three Wooden-Horse Turkic tribes, up until the 8th century when the Uyghurs took over.

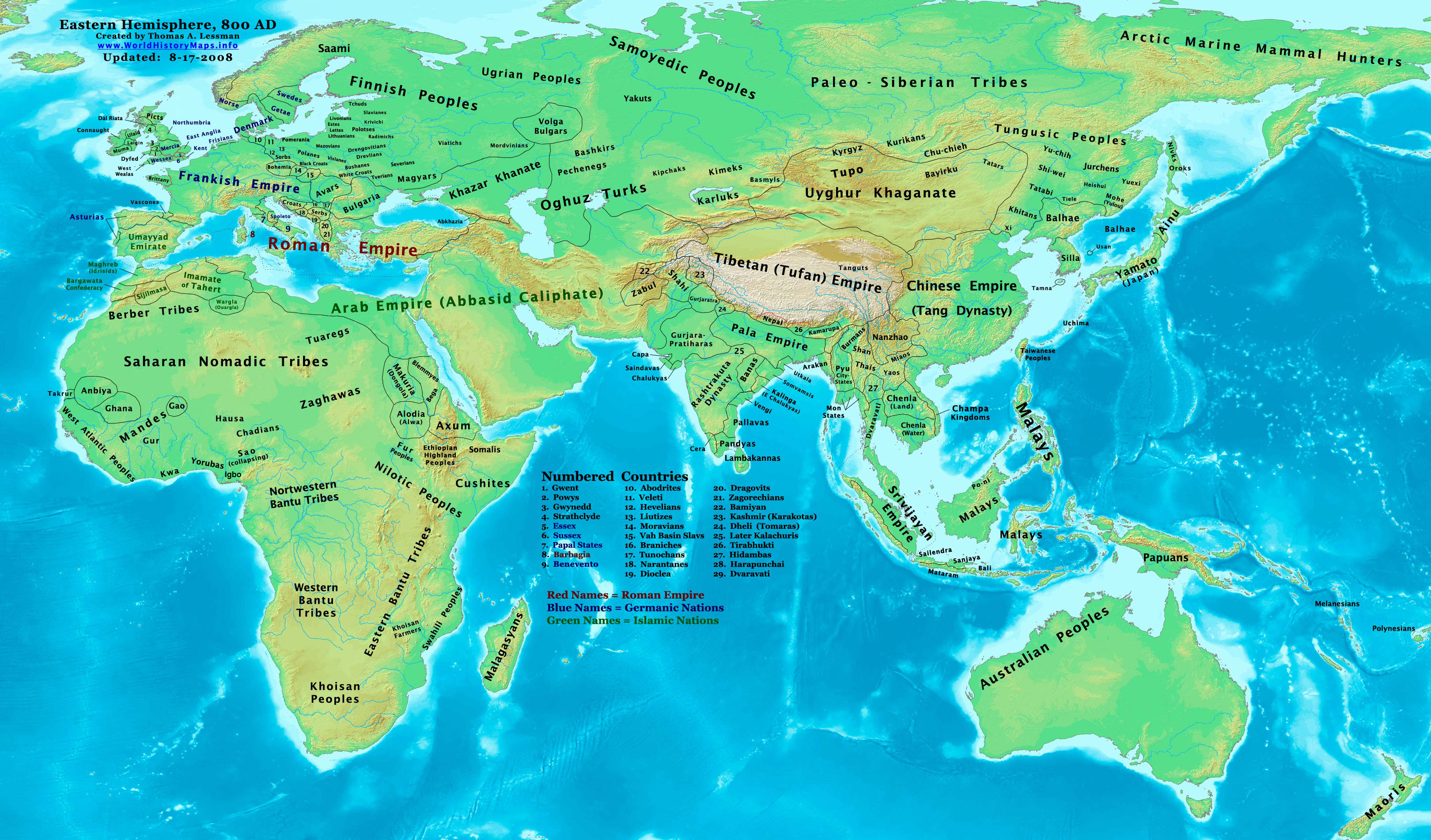
Map showing extent of Uyghur Khanate and placement of Kyrgyz in 820 AD.

Tuvans were subjects of the Uyghur Khanate during the 8th and 9th centuries. The Uyghurs established several fortifications within Tuva as a means of subduing the population. There are plans being discussed to restore the remains of one of these fortresses, Por-Bazhyn in lake Tere-Khol in the southeast of the country. The memory of Uyghur occupation could still be seen up until the end of the 19th century due to the application of the name Ondar Uyghur for the Ondar Tuvans living near the Khemchik river in the southwest. Uyghur dominance was broken by the Yeniseian Kyrgyz in 840 AD, who came from the upper reaches of the Yenisei.

In 1207, the Oirat prince Quduqa-Beki led Mongol detachments under Jochi to a tributary of the Kaa-Khem river. They encountered the Tuvan Keshdims, Baits, and Teleks. This was the beginning of Mongol suzerainty over the Tuvans. After the collapse of the Naiman Khanate, Tuvans moved to modern Mongolia and some Naimans moved to modern Kazakhstan territory.

Tuvans came to be ruled for most of the 17th century by Khalka Mongol leader Sholoi Ubashi Altan-Khan. It was at this time in 1615 that the first Russians, Vasily Tyumenets and Ivan Petrov, visited Tuva as emissaries to the Altan-Khan. Russian documents from this time record information about different groups that contributed to the composition of modern Tuvans. Tyumenets and Petrov describe the Maads, who became Russian subjects in 1609, living in the Bii-Khem basin, 14 days' ride from Tomsk. The Maads travelled to the area of the Khemchik and Ulug-Khem next to the lands of the Altan-Khan near the lake Uvs Nuur. The ambassadors also described the Sayan raising reindeer with the Tochi (Todzhi) from the Sayan to the Altai mountain ranges. The descendants of the Ak-Sayan and Kara-Sayan live mostly around Tere-Khol rayon.

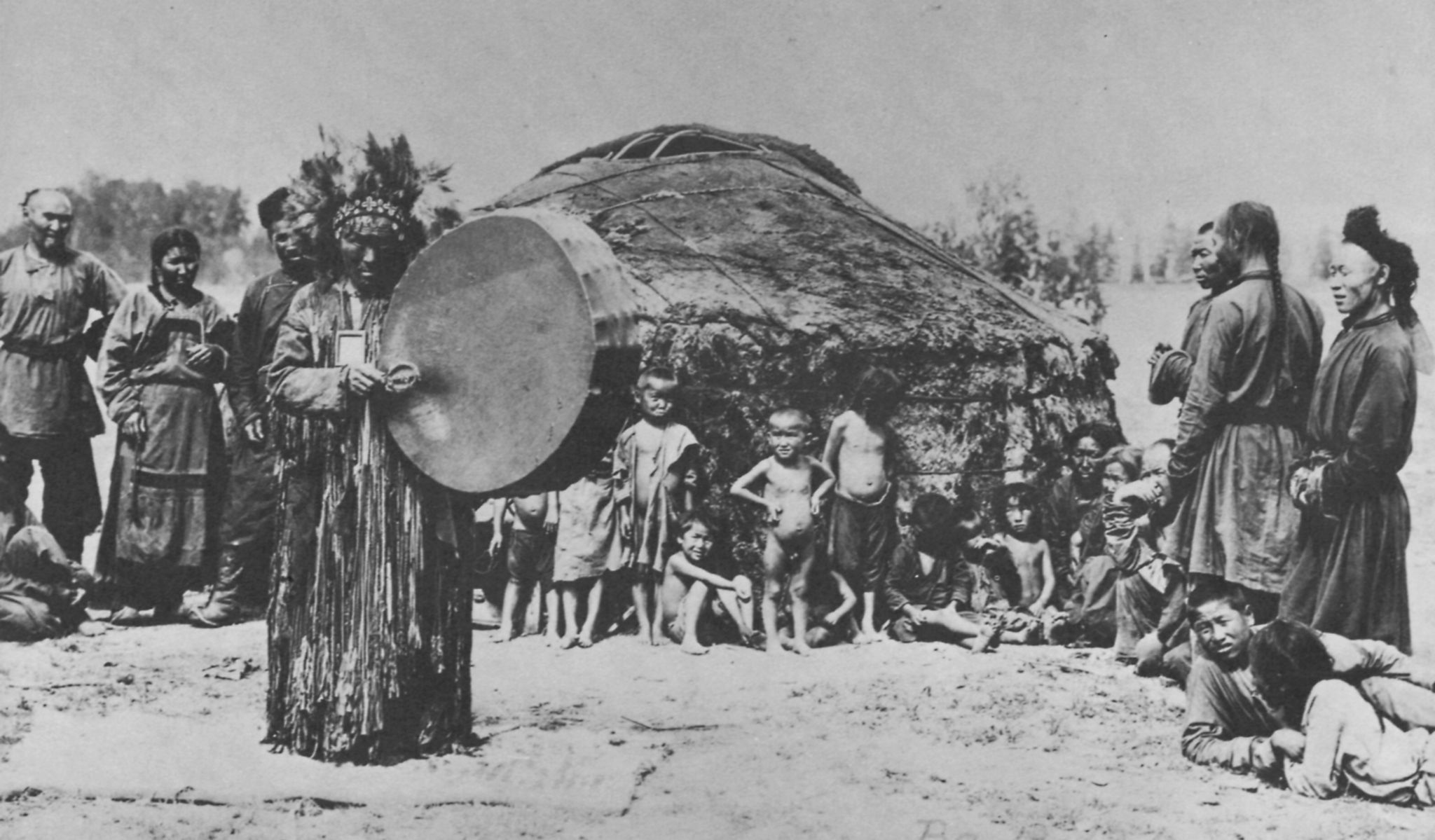
Tuvan shaman, c. 1900

The Altan-Khan's control over the area lessened over time due to constant warring between the Oirat and the Khalka of Jasaghtu Khan aimag. The Tuvans then became part of the Dzungarian Empire ruled by the Oirats. The Dzungars ruled over all of the Sayano-Altay Plateau until 1755. It was during this time of Dzungarian rule that many tribes and clans broke up, moved around, and intermingled. Groups of Altayan Telengits settled in western Tuva on the Khemchik and Barlyk rivers and in the region of Bai-Taiga. Some Todzhans, Sayans, and Mingats ended up in the Altay. The Siberians (Xianbei) established Manchu-Qing Dynasty migrated other Tuvans north across the Sayan range and they became known as Beltirs (Dag-Kakpyn, Sug-Kakpyn, Ak-Chystar, Kara-Chystar). The languages of the Beltirs and Tuvans still contain common words not found in the language of the other Khakas (Kachins or Sagays). Other Russian documents mention Yeniseian Kyrgyz (Saryglar and Kyrgyz), Orchaks (Oorzhaks) and Kuchugets (Kuzhugets) moving into Tuva from the north.

Genetic research revealed that Tuvans are most closely related to other Turkic peoples, specifically the Altaians and the Khakas. It was found that Tuvans display differences to Mongolic peoples and are closer related to Siberian Turkic groups. Tuvans seem to be the direct descendants of the Indigenous Southern Siberian peoples.

According to Ilya Zakharov of Moscow's Vavilov Institute of General Genetics, genetic evidence suggests that the Tuvan people are among the close genetic relatives to the indigenous peoples of the Americas in Eurasia.

=== The name Uriankhai ===
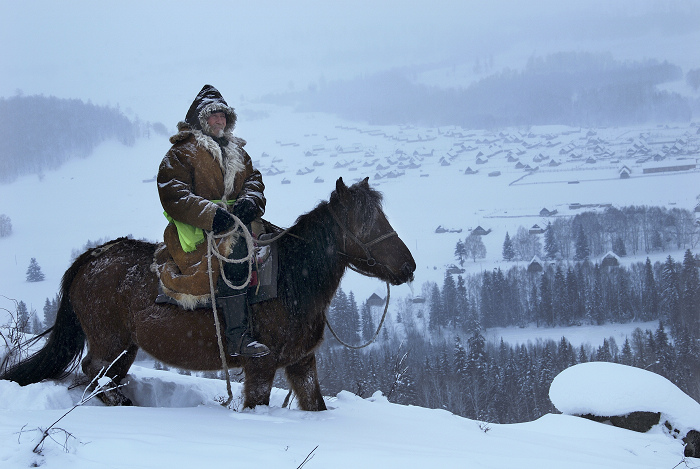
Tuvan on a horse

There does not seem to exist a clear ethnic delineation for the application of the name Uriankhai. Mongols applied this name to all tribes of Forest People. This name has historically been applied to Tuvans. In Mongolia there are peoples also known by this name. A variation of the name, Uraŋxai, was an old name for the Sakha. Russian Pavel Nebol'sin documented the Urankhu clan of Volga Kalmyks in the 1850s. Another variant of the name, Orangkae (오랑캐), was traditionally used by the Koreans to refer indiscriminately to "barbarians" that inhabited the lands to their north.

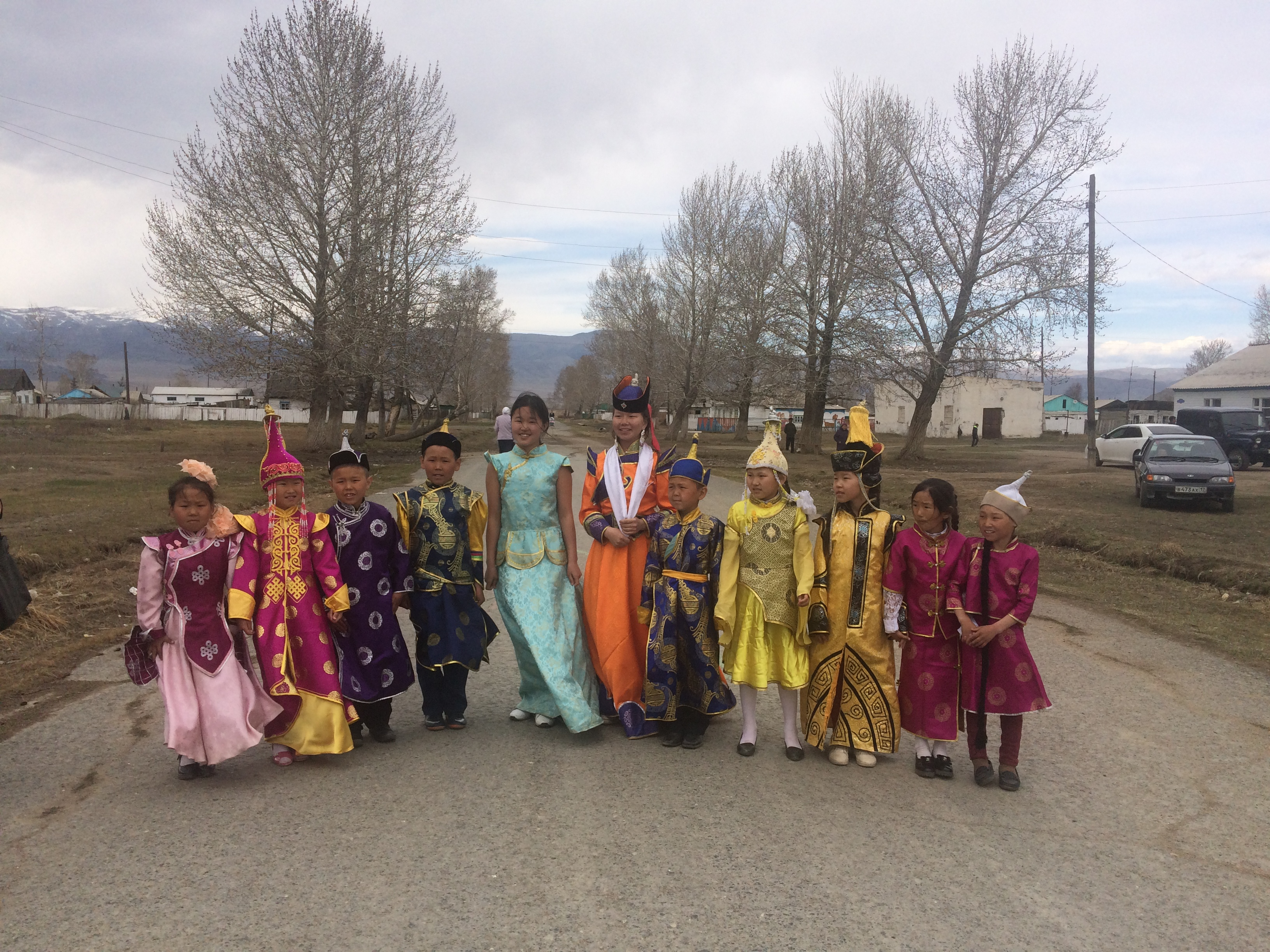
Ethnic Tuvans in 2017

They are two groups under the name Uriankhai: Mongol Uriankhai, Uriankhai (Tuva) of mixed Turkic-Mongol origin. All clans of the Mongol Uriankhai are Mongol, and Tuva Uriankhais have both Turkic and Mongol clans. In the beginning of the Mongol Empire (1206–1368), the Mongol Uriankhai (Burkhan Khaldun Uriankhai) were located in central Mongolia but in the mid 14th century they lived in Liaoyang province of modern China. In 1375, Naghachu, Uriankhai leader of the Mongolia-based colonial dynasty in Liaoyang province invaded Liaodong with aims of restoring the Mongols to power. Although he continued to hold southern Manchuria, Naghachu finally surrendered to the Chinese Ming dynasty in 1387–88 after successful diplomacy of the latter. After the rebellion of the northern Uriankhai people, they were conquered by Dayan Khan in 1538 and mostly annexed by the northern Khalkha. Batmunkh Dayan Khan dissolved Uriankhai tumen and moved them to Altai Mountains and Khalkha land.

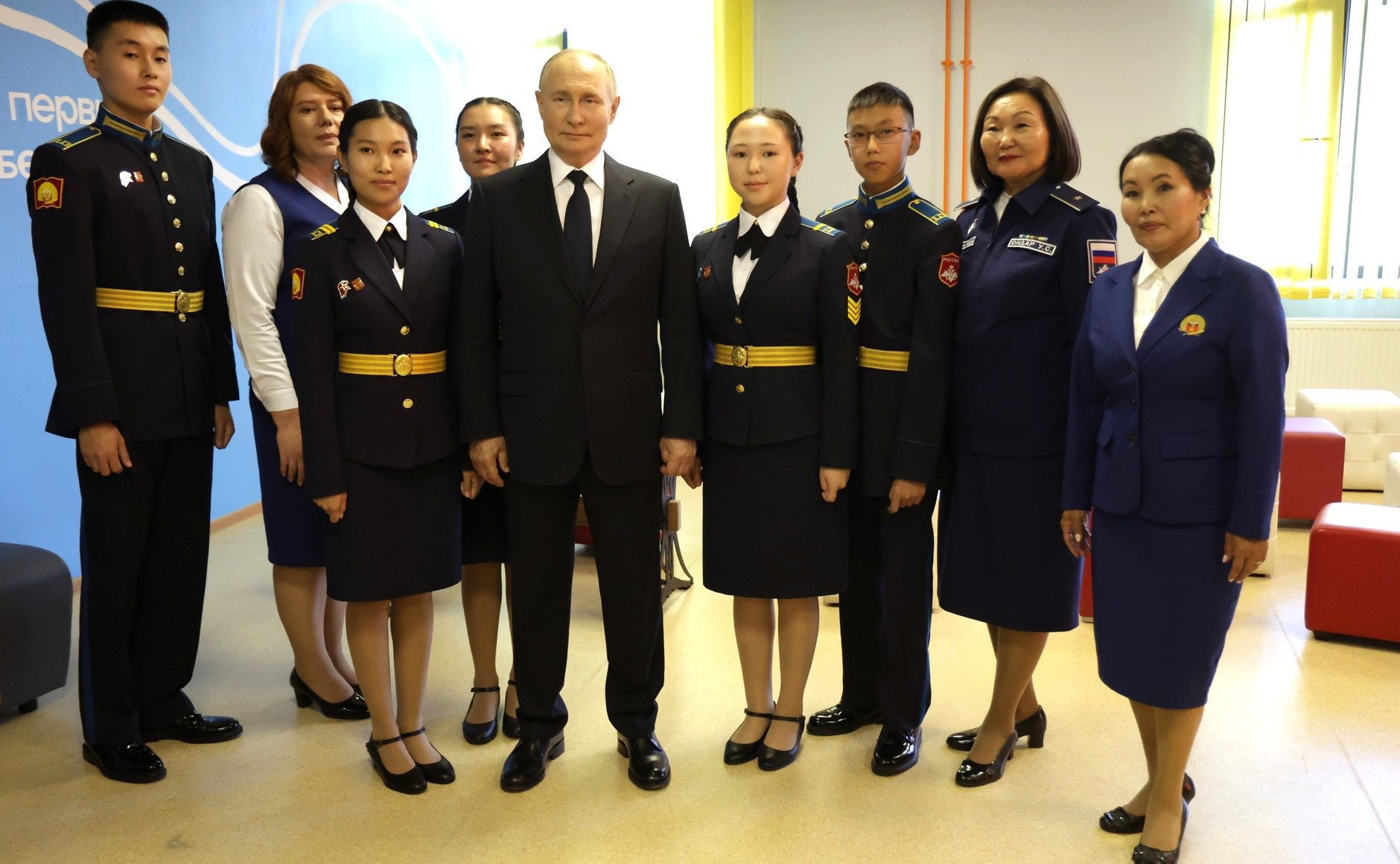
Russian President Vladimir Putin with young Tuvan cadets in Kyzyl, Tuva, 2024

Currently, Tuvans form the majority of the population in Tuva Republic. According to the 2010 Russian census, there was a total of 249,299 Tuvans who resided within Tuva. This represented 82.0% of the total population of the republic. In addition, Tuvans have a much higher fertility rate than Russians and the other Slavic peoples, while the median age of the Tuvan population is much lower than Russians. This basically ensures that the Tuvan population would continue to grow during the foreseeable future.

In the context of the Russian invasion of Ukraine since 2022, the Tuvans have been reported as one of Russia's ethnic minority groups suffering from a disproportionally large casualty rate among Russian forces.On 7 October 2026, Mediazona reported that at least 2,312 soldiers from the Tuvan Republic had been killed since the beginning of the invasion. Using data from the 2021 Russian census, it can be estimated at least 2,050 of these soldiers were ethnic Tuvans.

== Geography ==
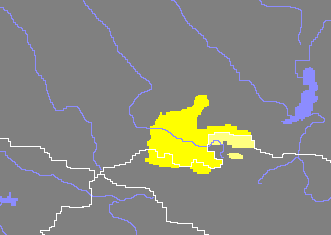
Distribution of the Tuvans in Russia and the Dukha in neighbouring Mongolia.

There are two major groups of Tuvans in Tuva: Western or the Common Tuvans and Tuvans-Todzhins (Тувинцы-тоджинцы). The latter ones live in Todzhinsky District, Tuva Republic and constitute about 5% of all Tuvans.

A people similar by language to Tuvans live in Okinsky District of Buryatia (autonym: Soyots (сойоты), sometimes referred to as Oka Tuvans).

=== Mongolia ===
A noticeable proportion of Tuvans lives in Mongolia. The Dukha live in Khövsgöl Aimag. The largest population of Tuvans in Mongolia are the Tsengel Tuvans. Around 1,500 live in the Tsagaan Gol River Valley, Altai Tavan Bogd National Park, Tsengel Sum of Bayan-Ölgii Aimag. Other Tuvans live in Khovd Aimag and in Ubsunur Hollow.

=== China ===
Tuvans in China, who live mostly in the Xinjiang Autonomous Region, are included under the Mongol ethnicity. Some Tuvans reportedly live at Lake Kanas in the northwestern part of Xinjiang in China where they are not officially recognized, are counted as a part of the local Oirat Mongol community that is counted under the general label "Mongol". Oirat and Tuvan children attend schools in which they use Chakhar Mongolian and Mandarin Chinese.

== Culture ==
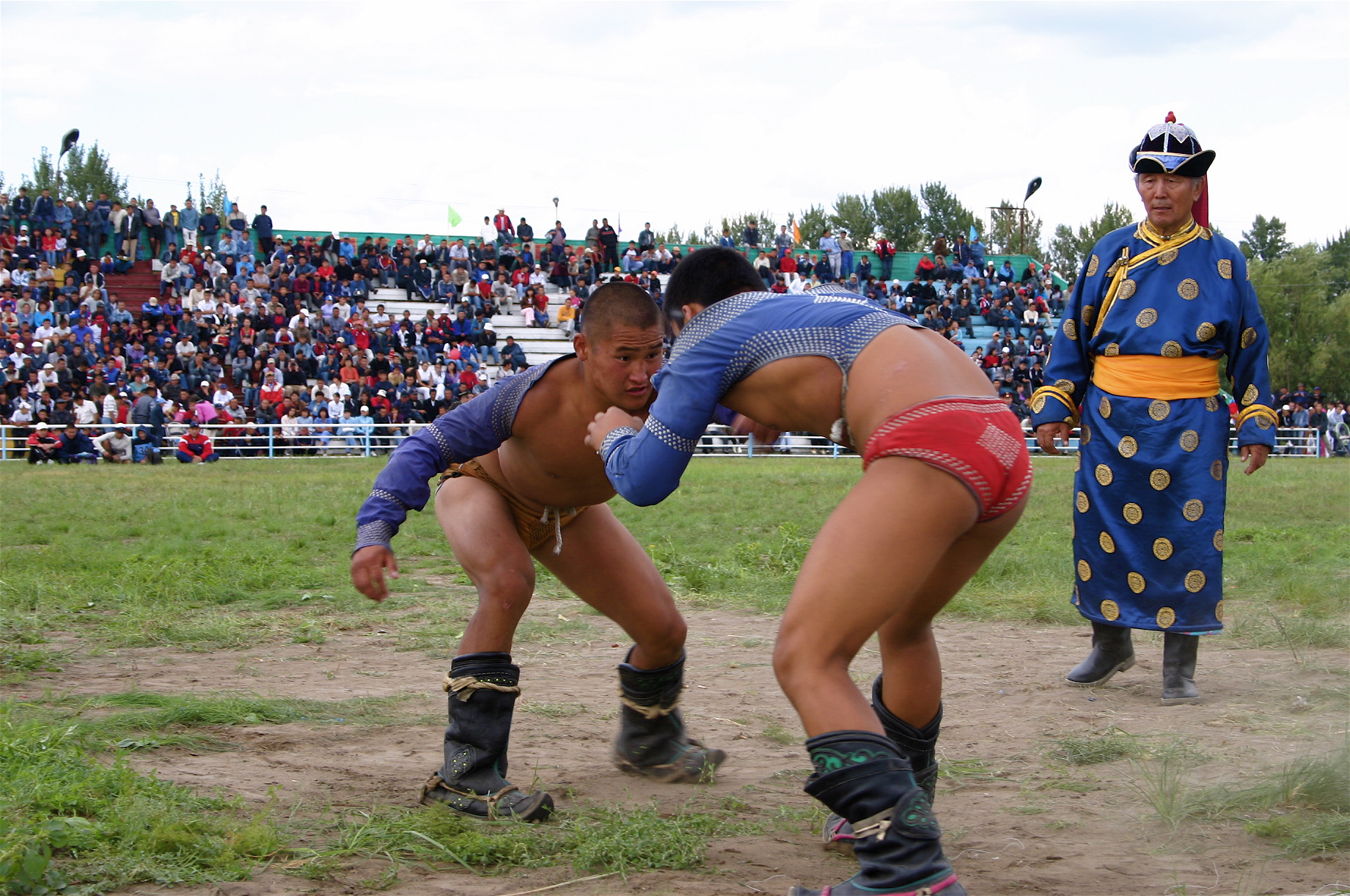
Tuvan wrestlers

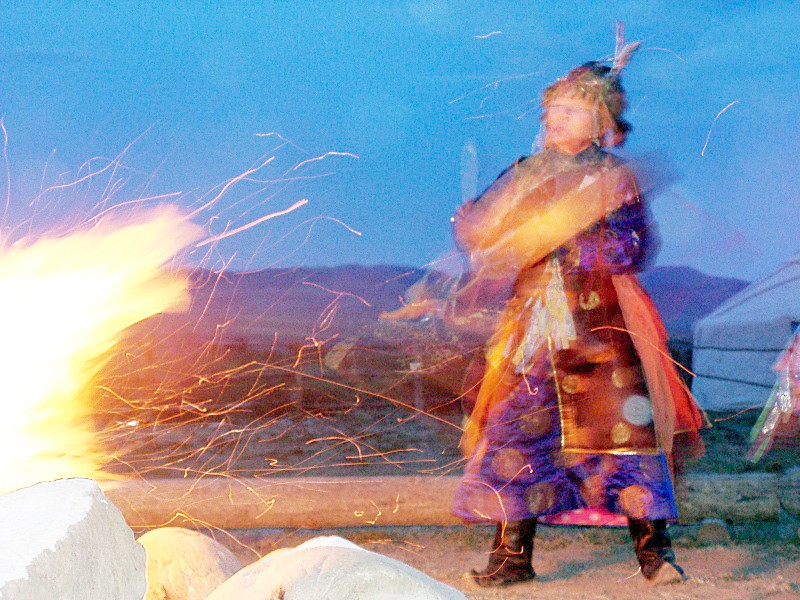
Shaman in Kyzyl, 2001. Tuvan shamanhood is being preserved and revitalized.

=== Headdress ===
The famous bogtag headdress worn by women seems to have been restricted to married women of very high rank.

=== Traditional life ===
The Tuvans were mainly semi-nomadic livestock herders. They raised sheep, goats, camels, horses, reindeer, cattle, and yaks. Today, some Tuvans still retain their semi-nomadic way of life. The mobile dwellings of the Tuvans were usually circular yurts used in the steppes or conical hide tents when they were near or inside a forest.

=== Language ===
The Tuvan language belongs to the Northern or Siberian branch of the Turkic language family. Four dialects are recognized: Central, Western, Southeastern and Northeastern (Todzhinian). In writing, a variety of the Cyrillic script is used. A talking dictionary is produced by Living Tongues Institute.

=== Religion ===
The traditional religion of Tuvans is a type of Tengriism, or Turkic animistic shamanism. During the 18th century, the Tuvans converted to Tibetan Buddhism via contact with the Mongolians. However, many shamanistic elements continued to be widely practiced along with the new religion the Tuvans adopted.

=== Music ===
A unique form of music exists in Tuva – commonly known as throat singing or as khoomei. There are various techniques of khoomei, some giving the effect of multiple tones by emphasizing overtones. Some famous groups from Tuva who feature throat-singing are Yat-Kha, Huun-Huur-Tu, Chirgilchin and the Alash Ensemble.

A documentary called Genghis Blues was made in 1999 about an American blues/jazz musician, Paul Pena, who taught himself overtone singing and traveled to Tuva to compete in a throat-singing competition. This is where he also met the famous Khoomeizhi Kongar-ol Ondar one of the masters of Khoomei.

=== Skiing ===
The Tuvan people have been skiing for thousands of years, primarily for the purpose of hunting elk. Tuvan hunters would track an elk in a heavy snow region and once they spotted an elk, they would ski downhill fast and throw a lasso to catch their game. Although the origin of skiing is hotly debated, some experts believe that the Tuvan people in the Altay mountains may have been the earliest humans to master skiing for the purpose of hunting, due to ancient cave paintings in the region depicting ancient skiers chasing big game. However, nowadays in the same region within Xinjiang, the hunting of animals has been banned by the Chinese government, who had made the entire mountain into a conservation area. But the Tuvan people still actively and legally engage in "catch-and-release" hunting of elk using their traditional methods.

== Notable people ==
- Galsan Tschinag (shaman and writer)
- Khertek Anchimaa-Toka (Tuvan/Soviet politician, first non-royal female head of state)
- Khün Khürtü (throat singing music group)
- Sergey Shoigu (Russian Minister of Defence and general)
- Kongar-ool Ondar (throat singer)
- Mongush Kenin-Lopsan (shaman and ethnographer)
- Albert Kuvezin (throat singer and guitarist)
- Vladimir Oidupaa (throat singer and bayanist)

== See also ==
- Lists of indigenous peoples of Russia
- Tannu Uriankhai
