= Saidash Mongush =

Russian musician (born 1976)

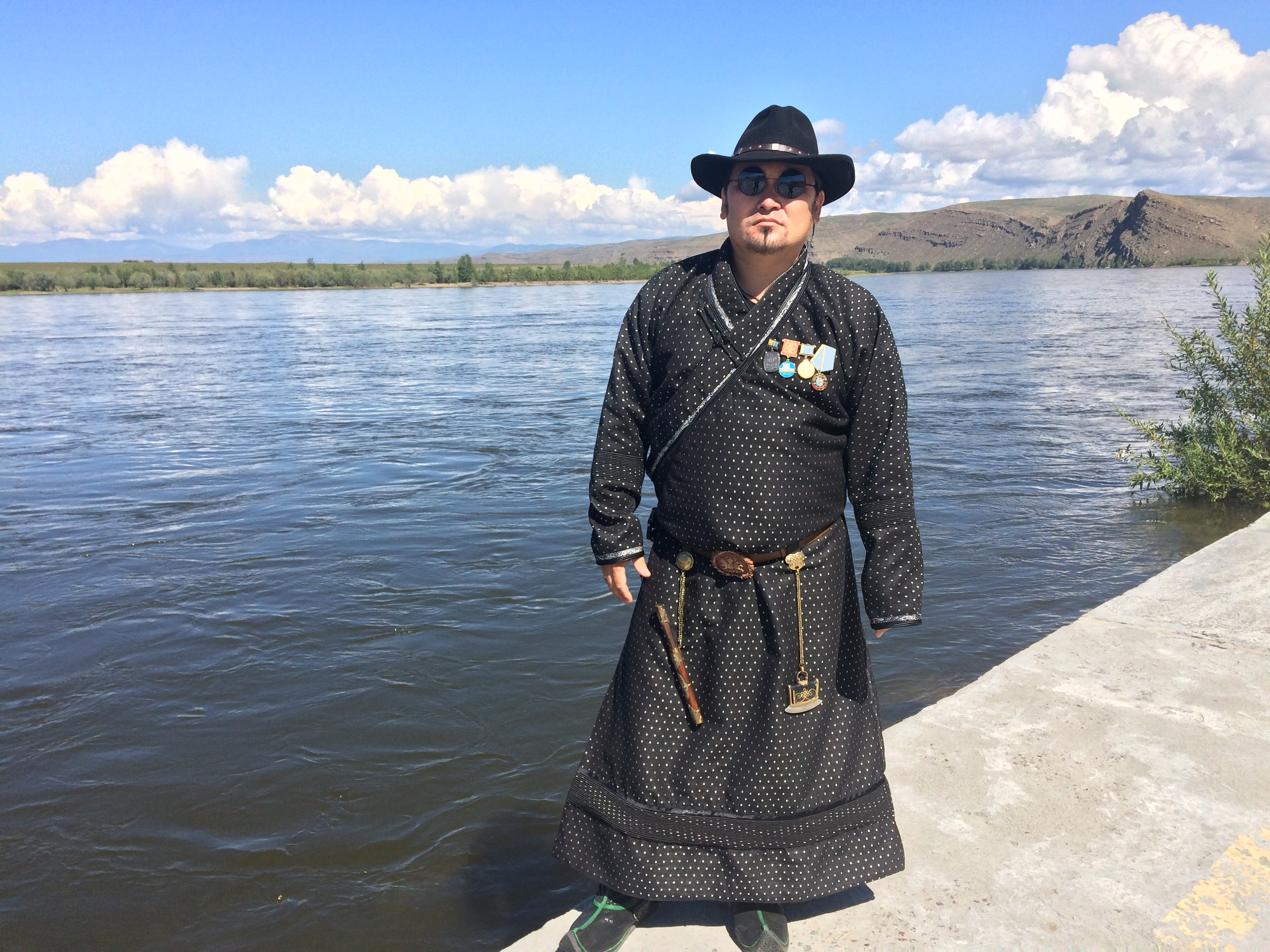
Mongush Saidash. 2016. At the Ulug-Khem

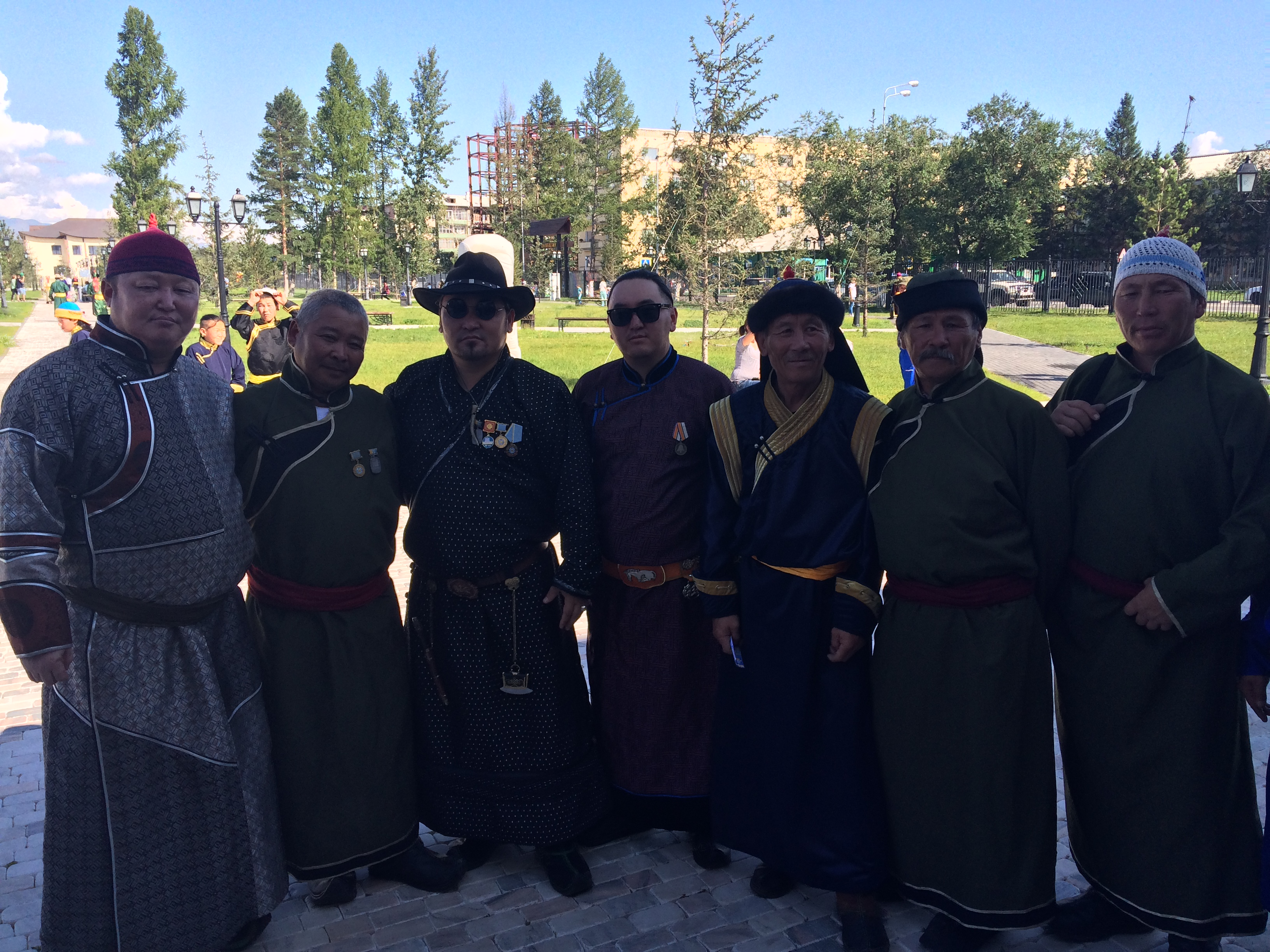
Saidash with other Tuvan throat singing masters, 2016. Kyzyl

Saidash Begzy Oglu Mongush (Tuvan: Моңгуш Сайдаш Бегзи оглу, romanized: Moñguş Saydaş Begzi oglu; born on August 6, 1976) is a Tuvan folk musician from Kyzyl known for his throat singing performance. He is associated with the Tuvan rock band Yat Kha and the folk group Huun Huur Tuu.

Mongush is an Honored Artist of the Republic of Tuva, Tuvan-Uryanh (Tangdy-Uraanhay), kickboxing champion of the Republic of Tuva (1993), theater and film actor.

== Biography ==
Born on August 6, 1976, in Old Shagaan-Aryg (or Shagonar), he spent his childhood in Chadan. In 1993, he won the kickboxing championship of the Republic of Tuva. After secondary school, he studied at a vocational school as a hairdresser and an automobile dealer.

== Education ==
- 1998–2003 Saint Petersburg State Theatre Arts Academy, graduated with honors.
- 2004 Tuvan State University, specialization: "Teacher of Russian language and literature" with Master grade.
- He currently studies in the correspondence department as an artistic director of the Russian Academy of Theatre Arts.

== Work ==
In 2012, Mongush represented Tuva at the Hamag Mongol music festival in Elista.

During the Hamag Mongol project he recorded some clips showcasing his music, for example "Өдүген-Тайга". (Odugen Taiga) which as of April 21, 2024, has over 14 million views on YouTube.
