= Dalai Beldiri =

Studio album by Yat-Kha
- Released: 1999
- Label: Wicklow
- Producer: Lu Edmonds

Yat-Kha chronology
Yenisei Punk (1995)	Dalai Beldiri (1999)	Aldyn Dashka (2000)

Dalai Beldiri is an album by the Tuvan band Yat-Kha. It was released internationally in 1999. The album title translates as "the confluence of the seas". The band supported the album with a North American tour.

== Production ==
The album was produced by Lu Edmonds. It mixed rock styles with Tuvan throat singing. Among the instruments used were the morin khuur and bass shanzi. Albert Kuvezin, Aldyn-ool Sevek, and Zhenya Tkach'v sang on Dalai Beldiri. Sevek employed the sygyt whistling style; Kuvezin sang bass. Kuvezin's guitar playing was influenced by Deep Purple, Led Zeppelin, and Jimi Hendrix.

== Critical reception ==
Professional ratings
Review scores
Source	Rating
AllMusic	4.5/5 stars
The Encyclopedia of Popular Music	4/5 stars
MusicHound World: The Essential Album Guide	4/5 stars

The Washington Post wrote that "most of the songs on Dalai Beldiri have traditional roots, but they have been rearranged by Kuvezin to combine Tuvan vocal styles and instruments in non-traditional ways with Western pop instruments added in discreet but helpful ways." The Vancouver Sun called "Sodom i Gomora" "a masterpiece," writing that "Tkach'v's haunting voice takes the lead here—the vocal is low and hypnotic, reminiscent of Latin church chanting, with Kuvezin providing a deep background rumble."

The Record determined that "Kuvezin's mixture of original and traditional Tuvan music includes some notable Japanese, aboriginal and 'worldbeat' influences that enlivens the music." The Chicago Tribune concluded that the trio "actually heightens the extraordinary sound of its music with tasteful, imaginative doses of Western drums, guitars and other electric instruments." Miami New Times praised "Charash Karaa", and advised: "Think of a Tibetan monk crooning Bacharach at a karaoke bar in Kabul, and you come within spitting distance of this wonderful and oddly touching slab of sheer testosterone." The Plain Dealer deemed Dalai Beldiri the 10th best album of 1999.

AllMusic wrote that the album "offers a dynamic take on traditional Tuvan instrumentals and vocalizations." In 2008, The Observer listed Dalai Beldiri as one of the 50 "Essential CDs from Around the World".

== Track listing ==
No.	Title	Length
1.	"Kaldak-Khamar"
2.	"Khemchim"
3.	"Dyngyldai"
4.	"Öpei Khöömei"
5.	"Kazhan Tören Karam Bolur"
6.	"Keergentchig"
7.	"Charash Karaa"
8.	"Ydyk Buura"
9.	"Höndergei"
10.	"Sodom i Gomora"
