= Aldyn-ool Sevek =

Tuvan throat singer (d. 2011)

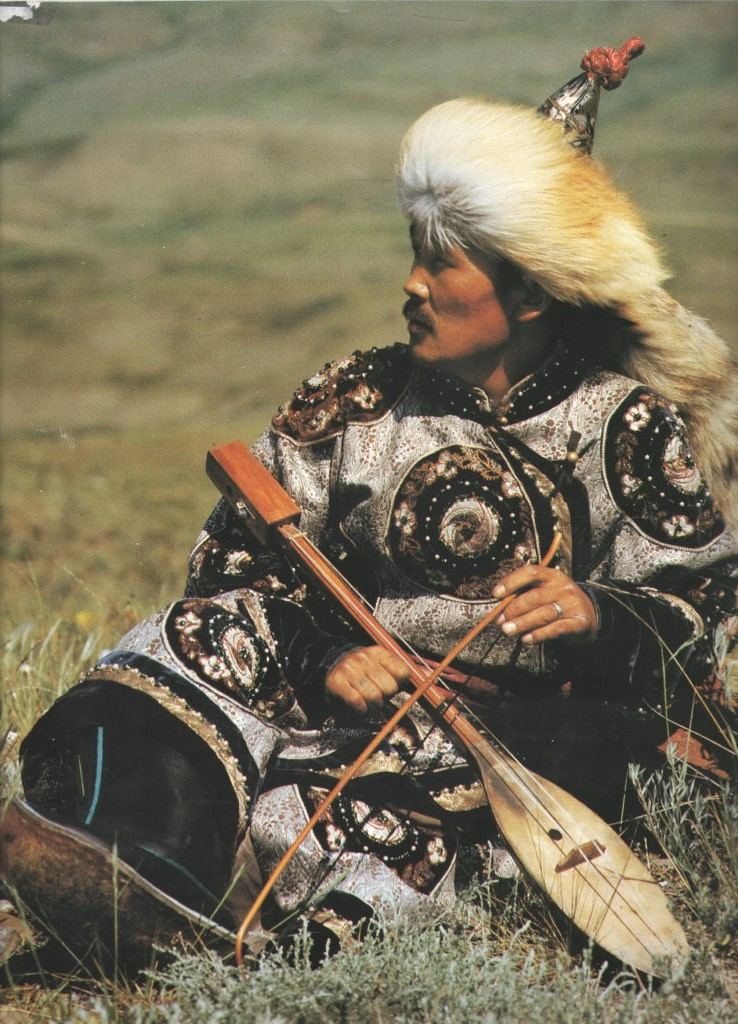
Aldyn-ool Takashovich Sevek

Aldyn-ool Takashovich Sevek (Tuvan: Алдын-ooл Севек, Russian: Алдын-оол Такашович Севек; 27 October 1963 – 11 September 2011) was a master Tuvan throat singer.

== Life ==
Sevek was from Mogur Aksi, a remote village in the Tuvan mountains. He was an accomplished master of khöömei (Tuvan: хөөмей), especially The Dag (mountain) Kargyraa style, for which he is a household name in the world of throat singing. His unique style is instantly recognizable on recordings, and despite many attempts, no-one has been able to successfully reproduce his sound. For a time, he performed with the group Yat-Kha. Sevek won the Grand Prize at the International Symposium of Throat-Singing.

Sevek died of throat cancer on 11 September 2011.
