= Tuvan National Orchestra =

The Tuvan National Orchestra (Тыва Национал Оркестр) reflects the complex history of the Republic of Tuva (sometimes spelled Tyva), a federal subject of Russia which sits at the southern edge of Siberia, with Mongolia to its south. Over the centuries, Tuva has been part of Chinese and Mongolian empires, and shares many cultural ties with Mongolia. In 1944 it joined the Soviet Union, and Tuva is now a constituent republic of the Russian Federation.

Formed in 2003 as the Tuvan National Orchestra of Traditional Instruments, the orchestra was originally directed by Aldar Tamdyn. It was then led by Conductor and Artistic Director Ayana Samiyaevna Mongush. In this unique orchestra, traditional Tuvan instruments are played alongside classical Western instruments and Soviet-era “hybrid” instruments. Orchestra members include musicians known in the West for their throatsinging (members of the groups Chirgilchin, Tyva Kyzy, and Alash), and Nikolai Damba.

The orchestra's current artistic director is Shoraan Salchak, and its manager is Artysh Opuilaa.
