= Gennadi Tumat =

Tuvinian master of throat singing

Gennadi Tumat (1964–1996) was a renowned Tuvinian master of throat singing. He created the Gennadi Tumat style of throat singing, also known as the Sygytting borbannadyr style.
