= Undertone singing =

Set of singing techniques

Undertone singing

Undertone singing is a set of singing techniques in which the vocalist makes use of vibrations of the vocal apparatus in order to produce subharmonic tones below the bass tone and extend the vocal range below the limits of the modal voice. In particular, the sound is produced via constricting the larynx in order to produce oscillations in the vocal cords and vestibular folds (or "false vocal cords") at certain frequencies of the vocal cords - corresponding to integer divisions of the frequency produced by the vestibular folds, such as 1:2, 1:3, and 1:4 ratios. This will produce the corresponding subharmonic to that frequency. For example, in a 1:2 ratio, each second vibration of the vocal folds, the vestibular fold will complete a single vibration cycle which will result in an subharmonic produced an octave below the bass tone produced by the vocal cords. This technique is found in certain Tibetan forms of Buddhist Chant, as practised by monks of the Gyuto Order, as well as in Mongolian throat singing, where it is often used in conjunction with other vocal techniques, such as vocal fry. The technique produces a deep, growling quality.

The version of undertone singing known as "subharmonic singing" or "subharmonics" has also come into use more recently by some modern bass singers such as Geoff Castellucci and Daniel Brevik. In essence, subharmonics work by using both vocal fry and modal voice to produce a note an octave (for the first subharmonic) below the original pitch. The production of this sound doesn't rely on the vestibular folds, instead vocal fry is employed to cause the vocal folds to enter a nonlinear vibratory state. This creates an oscillation with a frequency ratio of 1:2 (for first subharmonic), which is perceived as a note an octave lower than the one sung in modal voice. This lets normal basses achieve notes which are in the oktavist range.
