= Kidispey Choodu =

Tuvan aviator (1908–1946)

- Кидиспей Дагбаевич Чооду
- Born: 5 May 1908; Tes-Khemsky, Tannu Uriankhai, Outer Mongolia, Qing China
- Died: 17 December 1946 (aged 38); Kyzyl, Tuvan Autonomous Oblast, USSR
- Military career
- Allegiance: Tuvan People's Republic
- Rank: Major
- Awards: Order of Labor of Tuva

Kidispey Dagbaevich Choodu (Russian: Кидиспей Дагбаевич Чооду; 5 May 1908 – 17 December 1946) was an aviation pioneer, flight instructor, and the first Tuvan pilot.

== Biography ==
Choodu was born on 5 May 1918 to a family of cattle breeders in Tes-Khemsky, presently located in the Republic of Tuva in the Russian Federation. After serving in the Red Army from 1928 to 1930 he worked as a secretary. After the Tuvan People's Republic requested assistance developing regional aviation, Moscow admitted two Tuvans with military experience and fluent in Russian to the Orenburg Military Aviation School of Pilots - Kidispey Choodu and Lapshyn Oyun. Upon arrival at the school they were given Russian names to use in training to avoid attracting attention, and after completing the training with the rank of senior lieutenant they returned to Tuva. After the decision to build an airport in Kyzyl and obtain aircraft from the USSR, Choodu was tasked with piloting one of the new biplanes from the Abakan in the USSR to Tuva on 6 July 1938, and he managed to make a safe landing on the taiga despite the difficult navigation conditions and lack of aviation infrastructure in the region. After the historic landing - which was the first time an airplane landed in Tuva - the site visited by leaders of the republic, some of whom briefly rode the planes. Subsequently, Choodu participated in the development of the Kyzyl Airport, searching for an ideal enough spot to construct a runway in addition to people to run the airport and serve it including mechanics, technicians, and dispatchers. The USSR then agreed to provide more equipment to help construct the airport, installing radio stations in the major settlements in Tuva. However, due to the shortage of pilots, he was tasked with training new pilots, some of whom went on to fly on the Eastern Front of World War II. Choodu applied to be sent to the front as well after the German invasion, but was rejected and told that his work training new pilots and helping develop Tuvan aviation was more important. Although he was promoted to major in 1943, his career did not advance afterwards: suffering from tuberculosis throughout the last three years of his life, he was frequently confined to the hospital before he died in 1946. He was buried next to his wife Chatkar, who was a telephone operator and died just several months before him. In 2018 a monument in his honor was added to Kyzyl airport.
