= Albert Kuvezin =

Tuvan musician (born 1965)

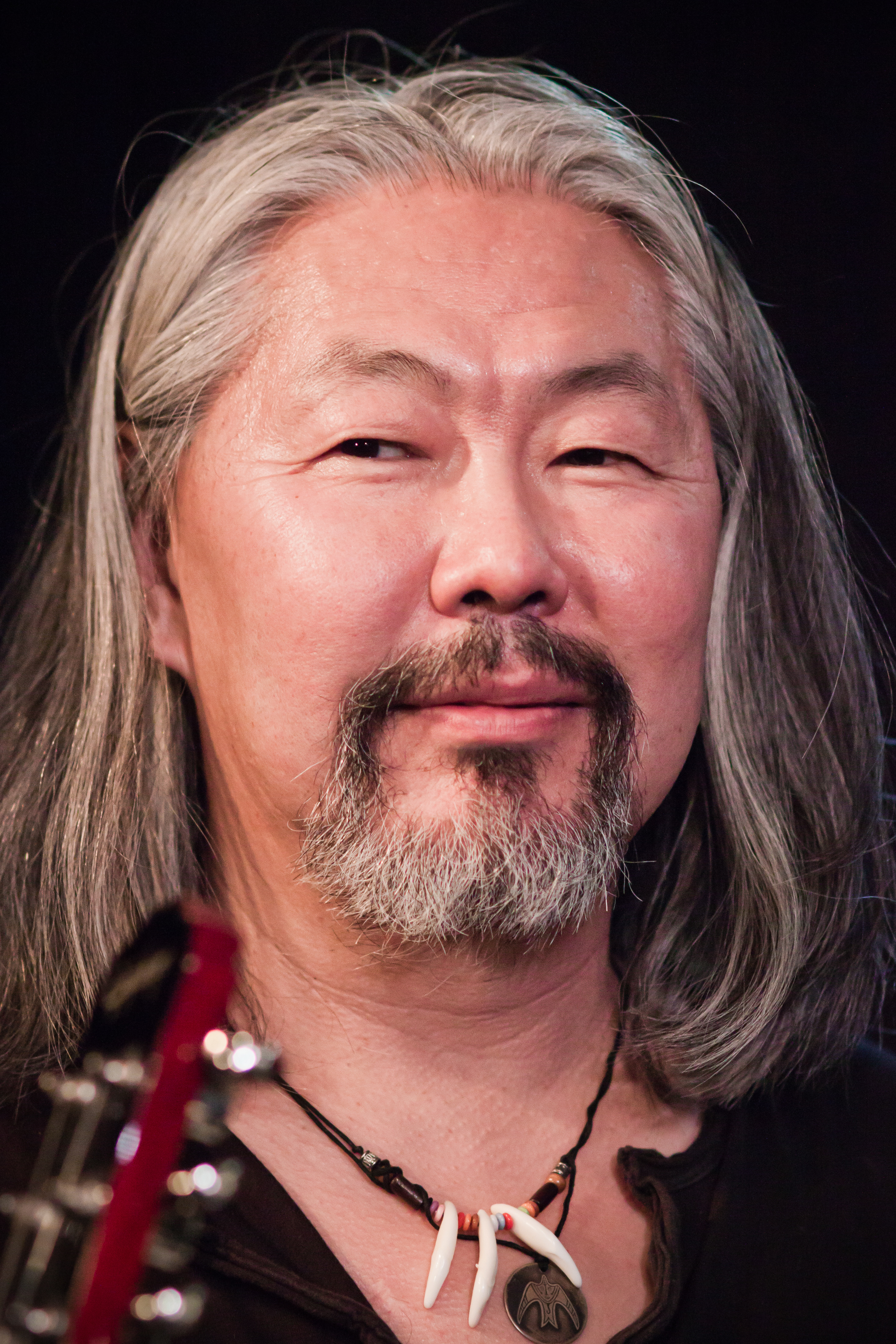

Background information
- Born: November 27, 1965 (age 60); Kyzyl, Russian SFSR, Soviet Union
- Genres: Throat singing; post-punk
- Occupations: Guitarist; singer
- Instruments: Vocals; guitar
- Member of: Yat-Kha
- Formerly of: Huun-Huur-Tu

Albert Budachievich Kuvezin (Russian: Альберт Будачиевич Кувезин; Tuvan: Күвезин Альберт Будачи оглу, romanized: Küvezin Albert Budaçi oglu, [kʰʏˈʋje̞zɪn ɐlʲ.be̞rtʰ bʊˈdɐt͡ɕʰɪ oˈ̞ʁɫʊ], alternatively spelled Kögêzin (Көгээзин, [kʰøˈ̞ɣe̞ːzɪn]), born 27 November 1965 in Kyzyl) is a Russian guitarist and throat singer. Kuvezin was one of the founding members of the Tuvan folk ensemble Huun-Huur-Tu, and is the leader of the Tuvan folk/rock/electro/post punk band Yat-Kha. He is known for his unique, contra-bass style of Tuvan kargyraa throat singing, which he calls "kanzat kargyraa."

His voice is featured in an Apple Inc ad for iPhone 15. The ad has reached over 13 million views on YouTube. In addition to his work with Yat-Kha, Kuvezin has contributed to albums by Alisa ("Duren", 1997), Blabbermouth, Susheela Raman, Untouchables, and Värttinä. In August, 2020 Uran Bator's track 'Uran Orda' featuring Kuvezin has been released.
