= Vladimir Oidupaa =

Tuvan musician, Khoomei and bayan performer

- Владимир Ойдупаа
- Born: Vladimir Oiunovich Oidupaa; 6 September 1949; Tuvan Autonomous Oblast, Soviet Union (now Tuva Republic, Russia)
- Died: 25 September 2013 (aged 64)
- Occupations: Singer; musician; songwriter
- Works: Discography
- Criminal charges: Attempted sexual assault (1 count); Murder (3 counts); youth corruption (1 count)
- Criminal penalty: 7 years; 10 years; 15 years
- Parent(s): Shekir Shegirapovna Ondar (mother); Oyun Anaevich Oydupaa (father)
- Musical career
- Genres: Khoomei; folk
- Instruments: Bayan; vocals

Vladimir Oiunovich Oidupaa (Russian: Владимир Ойунович Ойдупаа, Tuvan: Ойдупаа Владимир Ойун оглу, romanized: Oydupâ Vladimir Oyun oglu [ɔjduˈpaː vlɐˈdʲimir ɔjˈun ɔɡˈlu] 6 September 1949 – 25 September 2013), was a Tuvan musician who performed kargyraa and played bayan. He is considered one of the leading figures in contemporary Tuvan music.

== Early life ==
Oidupaa was born on 6 September 1949 in the Barun-Khemchik district of Soviet Tuva. His mother was a housewife, and his father worked as an instructor at that time. He had three siblings. As a Soviet worker, however, his father became the chairman of a collective farm in 1950, after which Oidupaa and his family moved to the village of Khondergey in Dzun-Khemchiksky District of Tuva. There, he was raised on a farm, where he also worked. His mother taught him to sing Khoomei.

Oidupaa claimed to have been interested in music since before birth, as his mother played records performed by Klavdiya Shulzhenko, Pyotr Leshchenko, and Leonid Utesov. He said these helped him understand how "the entire universe is filled with music." Before becoming skilled in the bayan, a type of accordion originating from the Russian Empire, Oidupaa was very skilled at the chadagan. His first accordion was gifted to him by his father, who had purchased it during a trip to Moscow. With time, Oidupaa taught himself how to play it. He also taught his sister to play the accordion, which she abandoned following her marriage.

== Probation and imprisonment ==
At the age of 21, Oidupaa was first sentenced to five years of probation after striking a man in the head. According to Oidupaa, he was breaking up a bloody domestic quarrel between a drunk husband and wife before the husband threw a brick at him, which Oidupaa then took and struck him back with. This later became a prison sentence after the wife wrote a statement claiming Oidupaa had beat her with intent to rape her—a claim Oidupaa rejected, believing the husband had forced her to write the statement. Oidupaa was sentenced to seven years in a high-security labor camp in Ak-Dovurak. He was released alongside many others in 1977 after an amnesty was given in honor of the October Revolution.

Later, Oidupaa was sentenced to ten years in prison in the Kyzyl labor camp for attempting to rape the niece of the former district attorney. Oidupaa recounts having given the former attorney and his niece a ride to a wedding going on nearby on his motorcycle. He claims the sentence was motivated by slander. During his time in prison, he learned to read the magazine Agitator. One issue contained the address to the Krupskaya Correspondence University of Culture, which he sent money to for courses. He would graduate from the university with honors. He was released in 1988.

Finding fame in the early 1990s, Oidupaa was able to perform some concerts in Sweden and Switzerland thanks to a fan from the latter. It is believed he was imprisoned for his third sentence following his return to Tuva, during which he mastered his style. However, upon his return from Sweden in 1991, he was imprisoned for a third time for 15 years in labor camps in Zlatoust, where he served his first five years, and Kemerovo Oblast, where he served the last ten, for three counts of murder and one count of corruption of a minor. He claims that he had visited a paralyzed woman in her home to perform with her at the suggestion of his siblings before she asked him to marry her daughter. Upon his refusal, he was sentenced. During his incarceration, he was employed as a graphic designer, where he rewrote much of the criminal code; he derived these skills from his education gained at the Kyzyl camp. He was released slightly ahead of the end of his sentence in January 2006, at age 56.

He was imprisoned for a total of 33 years, over half of his life. However, his sentences remains a heavily debated topic, as he claimed to maintain innocence throughout his life. Furthermore, political differences with authorities may have contributed to unfair bias towards his imprisonment, but these claims are contested. The timeline of his imprisonment remains vague, as even those in contact with Oidupaa claimed that he may have been imprisoned between two and three times for seven, eight, and fifteen years, respectively.

== Musical career ==
=== 1970–2006: Imprisonment and Divine Music from a Jail ===
During his time in the labor camps he learned to play the bayan, a prison-style accordion with only buttons, and developed his unique style of kargyraa. In 1999, Oidupaa released his debut album, Divine Music from Jail. According to his words, the album was recorded in the office of the prison warden.

=== 2006–2010: Later life, performances, and Singing with Echoes Through the Universe ===
After his release in 2006, he made a living through music and metal sculpting.

In 2007, Oidupaa appeared at Channel One Russia in Moscow in one of the contest programs but was booed from the podium before he could finish his performance, and Tatyana Tolstaya, one of the jury members, called his style "discordant" and "disharmonious". Oidupaa claimed later that he irritated her on purpose, to avoid the Channel broadcasting his records for free for two years if he won. Despite the reception in Russia, in 2011, his second album, Singing with Echoes Through the Universe, was released. Oidupaa's music has been appreciated by foreign listeners, and his works were remastered and reissued by Austrian label Ebalunga!!!, with mastering done by Grammy-nominated engineer Jessica Thompson.

== Personal life ==
While imprisoned, Oidupaa converted to Christianity, which was said to have influenced his musical style and message. Oidupaa says he subscribed to the faith during his time in the Kyzyl camps, in which prisoners were given books alongside cigarettes and tea. Upon reading of Indian epics, Iranian and Tajik poetry, and Russian folk tales, Oidupaa said he often saw the gospel mentioned in footnotes, which lead him to ultimately find a copy of the Bible, which he then read. He also took up painting as a hobby. He was also an avid reader, particularly in books on Zen Buddhism and shamanism. He was musically inspired by the composer Saaya Bürby.

== Death ==
Vladimir Oidupaa died in Tuva on the morning of 25 September 2013.

Tuva Prime Minister Sholban Kara-ool commented on the performer's death: "Vladimir Oidupaa was a colorful figure in music and made a significant contribution to its development. His work has numerous admirers, and his talent has been recognized by musicologists. I express my condolences to all who mourn Vladimir. Surely his musical talent was not wasted, and he has creative followers." In November 2013, an American fan of Khoomei, Steve Sklar, publicly released his recordings of Oidupaa during a trip to Siberia and Mongolia some years prior.

== Legacy ==
Oidupaa created his own style of kargyraa performance (high-tone kargyraa accompanied by the bayan), known as Oidupaa style and developed further by notable Tuvan performers including Chirgilchin. The Oidupaa style has been compared to blues thanks to the bayan's tuning in minor thirds. Oidupaa inspired the younger generation of Tuvans. Other Tuvan musicians like Yura Deleg and Mönggün-ool Dambashtai took elements of Oidupaa's style and further adapted it to their styles.

While imprisoned, Oidupaa was both a "hero and an outcast at the same time," much like Blues singers of Mississippi.

== Discography ==
=== Albums ===
Title	Details
Divine Music from a Jail	Released: 1999; Label: Friends Records
Singing with Echoes Through the Universe	Released: 7 March 2011; Label: EBALUNGA!!!

== See also ==
- Tuvan throat singing
- List of overtone musicians#Turkic and Mongols
