= Tuvan throat singing =

Style of overtone singing

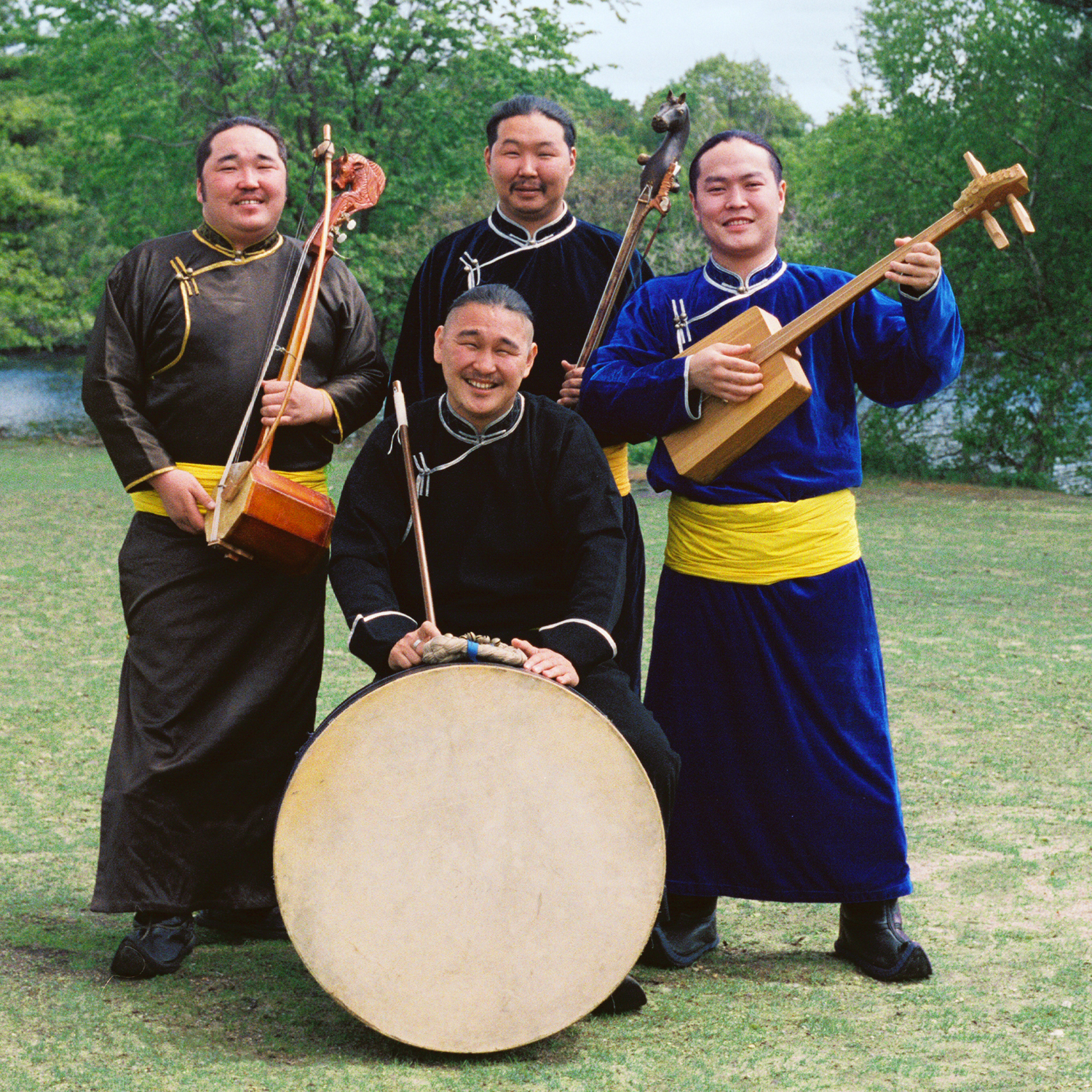
The Alash ensemble, a throat singing band from Tuva

Tuvan throat singing, also known as Mongolian throat singing, is a style of throat singing, the main technique of which is known as khoomei (/xuˈmiː/ or /xoʊˈmeɪ/). (Note: Tuvan: хөөмей, romanized: höömey; Mongolian: ᠬᠦᠭᠡᠮᠡᠢ, хөөмий, khöömii; Russian: хоомей, romanized: khoomeĭ; Chinese: 呼麦, pinyin: hūmài) It is practiced by people in Tuva, Mongolia, Inner Mongolia and Altay.

Tuvan throat singing is noted for including overtone singing or undertone singing, depending on technique. In 2009, Tuvan throat singing was included in the Representative List of the Intangible Cultural Heritage of Humanity of UNESCO.

== Overview ==
In Tuvan throat singing, the performer hums a fundamental pitch and—simultaneously—manipulates the overtones that belong to that fundamental pitch, creating a melody. The history of Tuvan throat singing reaches far back. Many male herders can throat sing, but women have begun to practice throat singing as well. The popularity of throat singing among Tuvans seems to have arisen as a result of geographic location and culture. The open landscape of Tuva allows for the sounds to carry a great distance. Ethnomusicologists studying throat singing in these areas mark khoomei as an integral part in the ancient pastoral animism still practiced today. Often, singers travel far into the countryside looking for the right river, or go up to the steppes of the mountainside to create the proper environment for throat singing.

The animistic world view of this region identifies the spirituality of objects in nature, not just in their shape or location, but in their sound as well.

Ordinarily, melodies are created by isolating the 6th, 7th, 8th, 9th, 10th, 12th and 13th partial in accordance with the harmonic series. Thus, if the fundamental frequency were C3, the overtones would be G5, B♭5, C6, D6, E6, G6, A6. However, it is possible to reach as low as the 2nd and also way above the 16th. The fundamental pitch is typically around E and G below middle C, and this affects the range of partials the singer can reach, with higher partials more easily reached on lower notes, and vice versa.

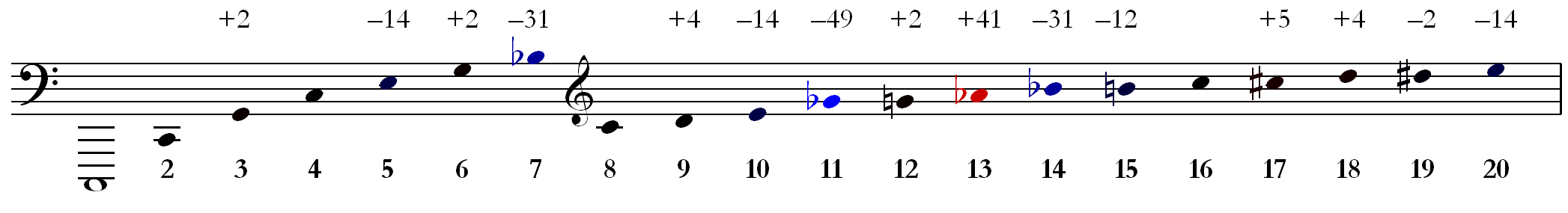
An illustration of the harmonic series in musical notation. The numbers above the harmonic indicate the number of cents difference from equal temperament (rounded to the nearest cent). Blue notes are flat and red notes are sharp.

The people of Tuva have a wide range of throat singing vocalizations and were the pioneers of six-pitch harmonics. There are several different classification schemes for Tuvan throat singing. In one, the three basic styles are khoomei, kargyraa and sygyt, while the sub-styles include borbangnadyr, chylandyk, dumchuktaar, ezengileer and kanzyp. In another, there are five basic styles: khoomei, sygyt, kargyraa, borbangnadyr and ezengileer. The substyles include chylandyk, despeng borbang, opei khoomei, buga khoomei, kanzyp, khovu kargyraazy, kozhagar kargyraazy, dag kargyraazy, Oidupaa kargyraazy, uyangylaar, damyraktaar, kishteer, serlennedyr and byrlannadyr. These schemes all use Tuvan terminology.

== Styles and techniques ==
=== Khorekteer ===
Khorekteer (Cyrillic: хөректээр, transliterated: khörekteer) refers to the "chest voice". This term refers to the voice that throat singers use when using khöömei, sygyt, and khovu kargyraa (not dag kargyraa), among other sub-styles. It can also refer to the feeling of chest resonance that one experiences when throat singing. Khorekteer is often used as a launching pad into the khoomei, sygyt, or kargyraa styles of throat singing.

Ethnomusicologist Zoya Kyrgys, proposed this term in the 90s, to help clarify how much this timbre is essential for all Tuvan throat singing. Since in Tuvan "khorekteer" can also mean "to raise the voice against someone", not everyone agreed on using this word, preferring just "khöömei", underlining the importance of the feeling of chest resonance.

=== Khoomei ===
The most popular style of throat singing is known as khoomei (or khöömei, in Cyrillic: хөөмей). The term hömey or kömey means 'throat' and 'larynx' in various Turkic languages.

Khoomei is traditionally a softer sounding style, with the fundamental (or drone) usually in the low-mid to midrange of the singer's normal voice. In this style, usually two or three harmonics can be heard between one and two octaves above the fundamental. In khoomei, the abdomen is fairly relaxed, and there is less tension on the larynx than in other styles. Pitch is manipulated through a combination of movements of the lips, throat, tongue or jaw.

The term khoomei is also used as a generic term to designate all throat singing techniques in this region.

=== Sygyt ===
Sygyt (in Cyrillic: сыгыт), literally 'whistling', has a midrange fundamental and is characterized by strong, flute-like or rather piercing harmonics, reminiscent of whistling. The ideal sound for the harmonics is called Чистый звук—Russian for clear sound.

To perform sygyt, the tongue rises and seals around the gums, just behind the teeth. A small hole is left back behind the molars, either on the left or right side. The sound is then directed between the teeth to the front of the mouth. The lips form a bell-like shape, usually with an "ee" vowel, and the sound is directed through this small opening. Pitch is manipulated exactly the same way as in khoomei style.

=== Kargyraa ===
The more deep-sounding style of throat singing is known as kargyraa (in Cyrillic: каргыраа). Kargyraa has a deep, almost growling sound to it and is technically related to Sardinian bass singing in Cantu a tenore choirs. It uses both the vocal and the vestibular folds (also known as "false vocal cords") simultaneously, creating two connected sources of sound.

By constricting the larynx, the vestibular folds can be brought together (adducted) and, under certain conditions, vibrate. It can produce an undertone exactly half the frequency of the fundamental produced by the vocal folds. Therefore, for each second vibration of the vocal folds, the vestibular fold completes a whole vibration cycle. While the larynx generates such rich sound, the mouth cavity may be shaped, just like in the manipulation of vowels, to select some particular harmonics, resulting in a sound that may be perceived as having different pitches simultaneously.

This vocal mechanism has been elucidated and shown to be the same as in Sardinian bassu, which is one of the four voices of Sardinian canto a tenore choirs. It is also similar to the chant practiced in Tibet by the Gyuto monastery and other Buddhist orders, even though the technique is very different. In beatboxing, the kargyraa sound is known as Throat Bass.

There are two types of kargyraa: dag (mountain) and xovu (steppe). The Dag style is deeper, while xovu is raspier and sung at a higher pitch with more throat tension and less chest resonance. There are also the distinctive kargyraa styles of Vladimir Oidupaa and Albert Kuvezin, the latter also bearing the name kanzat. This is sometimes described as the howling winds of winter or the plaintive cries of a mother camel after losing her calf.

=== Effects and other styles ===
The following are two effects commonly employed in the khoomei, sygyt and kargyraa styles: Borbangnadyr and Ezengileer.

- Borbangnadyr (Борбаңнадыр) is a trill reminiscent of birds and traveling brooks, made by rapid movements of the tongue and lips. Another effect that is usually added to this style is the light quivering of the lips, called "byrlang".
- Ezenggileer (Эзеңгилээр) is a pulsating style, attempting to mimic the rhythms of horseback riding. It is named after the Tuvan word for stirrup, ezengi. It is obtained by opening and closing the velum, which separates the nasal cavity from the oral cavity.
- Chylandyk (Чыландык) is simultaneous sygyt and kargyraa. This creates an unusual sound of low undertones mixed with the high Sygyt whistle. It has also been described as the "chirping of crickets". A careful listener can further break down this style into Dag Chylandyk and Xovu Chylandyk.
- Dumchuktaar (Думчуктаар) could be best described as "throat humming". The singer creates a sound similar to sygyt using only the nasal passage. The word means to sing through the nose (dumchuk). The mouth does not need to be closed, but of course, it demonstrates the point better.

== Women in Tuvan throat singing ==
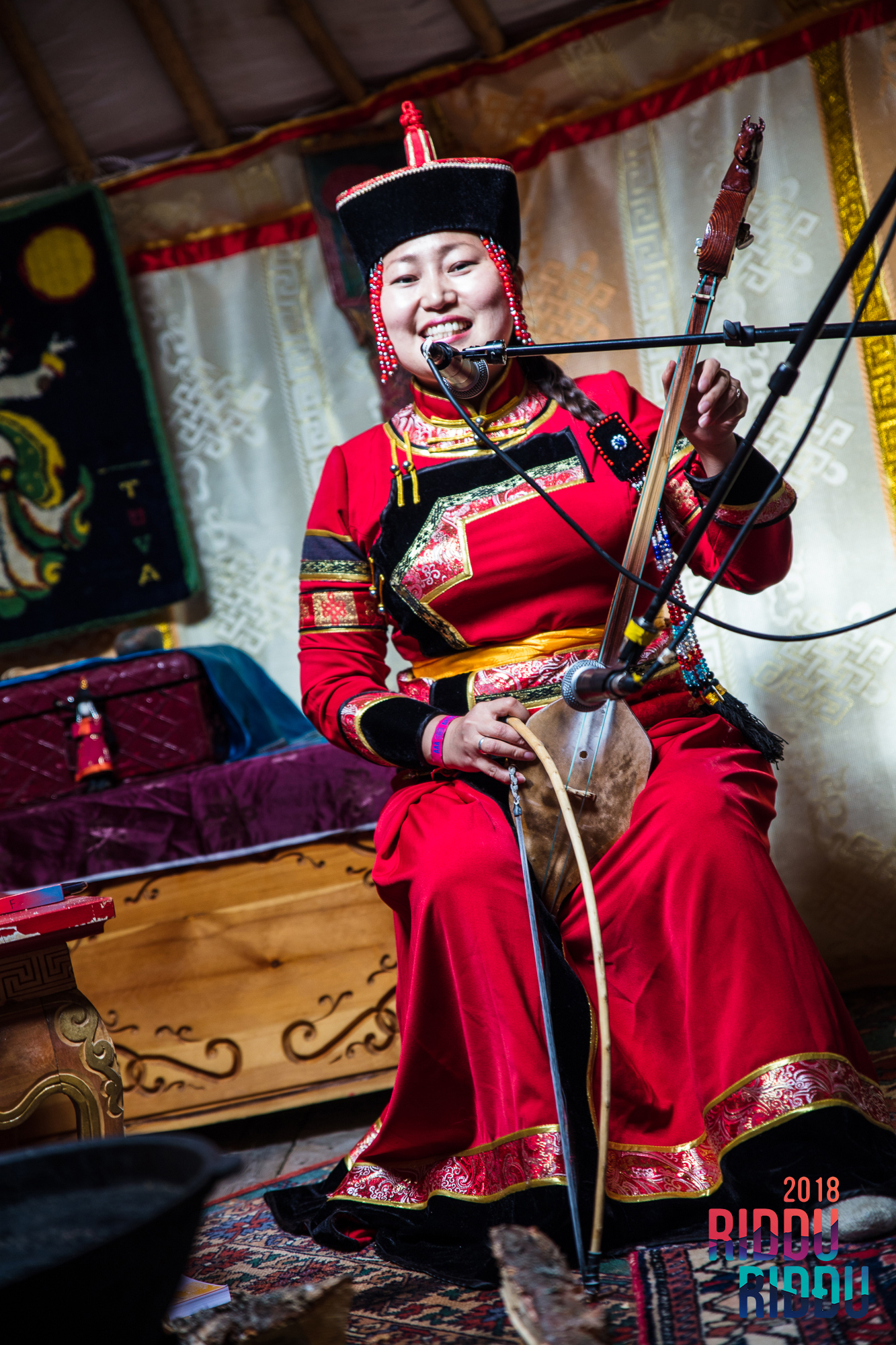
A member of Tyva Kyzy

There were a few female throat singers in Tuva's history, though it was believed a woman performing throat singing could cause infertility. Choldak-Kara Oyun, the mother of the famous throat singer Soruktu Kyrgys and grandmother of the husband of famous Tuvan actress Kara-Kys Namzatovna Munzuk, throat sang throughout her life while milking her cows, singing lullabies to her children and sometimes while she was drinking Tuvan araga (fermented milk alcohol). Close relatives of famous singers, like Khunashtaar-ool's niece (in the 1960s) and Kombu's daughter (in the 1940s or 1950s), performed khoomei (throat singing) in public more than once. The wife of the throat singing shaman Bilek-ool from Manchurek, Aldinsova Tortoyavna, said that she has always sung khoomei "because it was innate to [her] from birth". She could not resist singing khoomei after she got married and had children, and sang khoomei in public in the 1950s and 1960s. But her sister, who also sang khoomei as a girl, gave up when others repeatedly reminded her of the supposed dangers.

Valentina Salchak performed throat singing in public in 1979. Valentina Chuldum from Mongun-Taiga (1960 – Autumn 2002) toured European countries as a throat singer in the early 1990s. With the start of the International Symposium of Khoomei women could sing publicly there.

Tyva Kyzy (Тыва Кызы, pronounced [tɯˈva kɯˈzɯ]) (Daughters of Tuva, in Tuvan language), founded in 1998, is an all-female folk ensemble performing Tuvan throat singing, under the direction of Choduraa Tumat. It is the first and only women's group in Tuva that performs all styles of Tuvan throat singing.

== In popular culture ==
- Richard Feynman, a Nobel Prize–winning physicist, took an interest in Tuvan throat singing and attempted to travel to Tuva in the 1980s, near the end of his life when he was gravely ill from cancer. Although Feynman never made it to Tuva, his daughter visited there in 2009 and met with Tuvan throat singers during her trip.
  - The Quest for Tannu Tuva is a 1988 documentary film about Feynman's quest that was produced for the BBC TV series Horizon; it was also repackaged with American narration and titled The Last Journey of a Genius for the PBS series Nova in 1989.
  - Tuva or Bust! is a book published in 1991 by Ralph Leighton, a biographer and longtime friend of Feynman who had tried to go to Tuva with him. The book includes a flexi disc recording of Tuvan throat singing.
- Yat-Kha is a band formed in 1991 and led by Tuvan throat singer Albert Kuvezin that performs a mixture of Tuvan traditional music and rock.
- Huun-Huur-Tu is a band formed in 1992 that incorporates Tuvan throat singing in its performances and has performed internationally since soon after its inception.
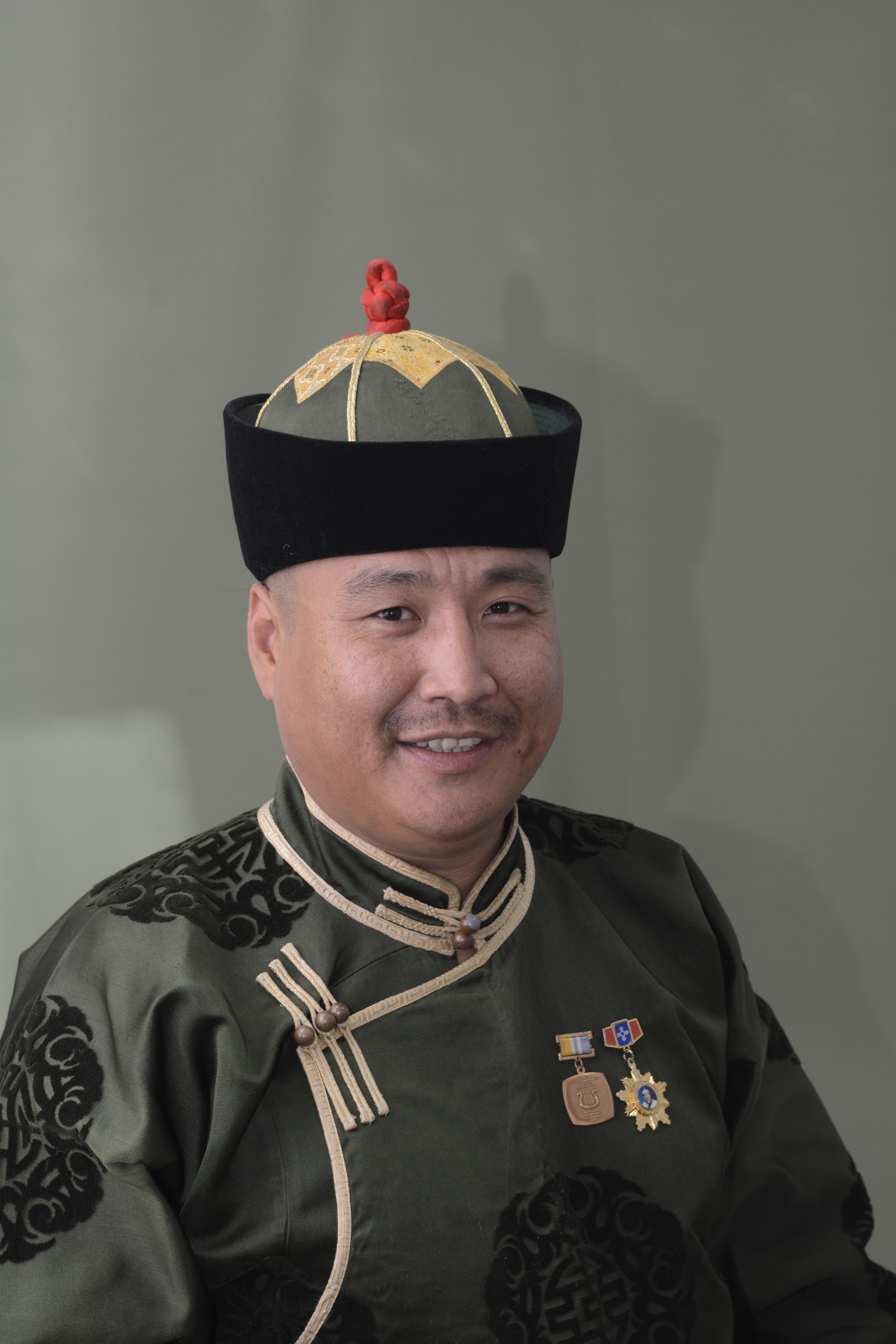
Igor Kөshkendey of Chirgilchin
- Chirgilchin is a Tuvan musical group formed in 1996 led by Igor Koshkendey, who won the Grand Prix of the International Throat Singing Competition in 1998, 2000, and 2002.
- K-Space is a British-Siberian experimental improvisation music ensemble formed in 1996 that features the Tuvan throat singer Gendos Chamzyryn.
- Tyva Kyzy is an all-female folk ensemble formed in 1998 that performs Tuvan throat singing and has performed internationally.
- Genghis Blues is a 1999 documentary film that won the Sundance Film Festival Audience Award for a Documentary and was nominated for an Academy Award for Best Documentary Feature, centers on the journey of blind American singer Paul Pena to Tuva to pursue his interest in Tuvan throat singing.
- Alex Brightman used Tuvan throat singing in his portrayal of Beetlejuice in the Broadway version of Beetlejuice The Musical. The Musical. The Musical.
- Alash is an ensemble of Tuvan musicians and throat singers formed at the Kyzyl Arts College in 1999 that has performed internationally since 2006.
- The Tuvan National Orchestra, formed in 2003, often features Tuvan throat singing and includes performances by internationally known artists, including members of Alash, Chirgilchin, Huun-Huur-Tu, and Tyva Kyzy.
- Batzorig Vaanchig, a member of the band Khusugtun, which was a runner-up on Asia's Got Talent in 2015, is a Mongolian throat singer with tens of millions of views on YouTube.
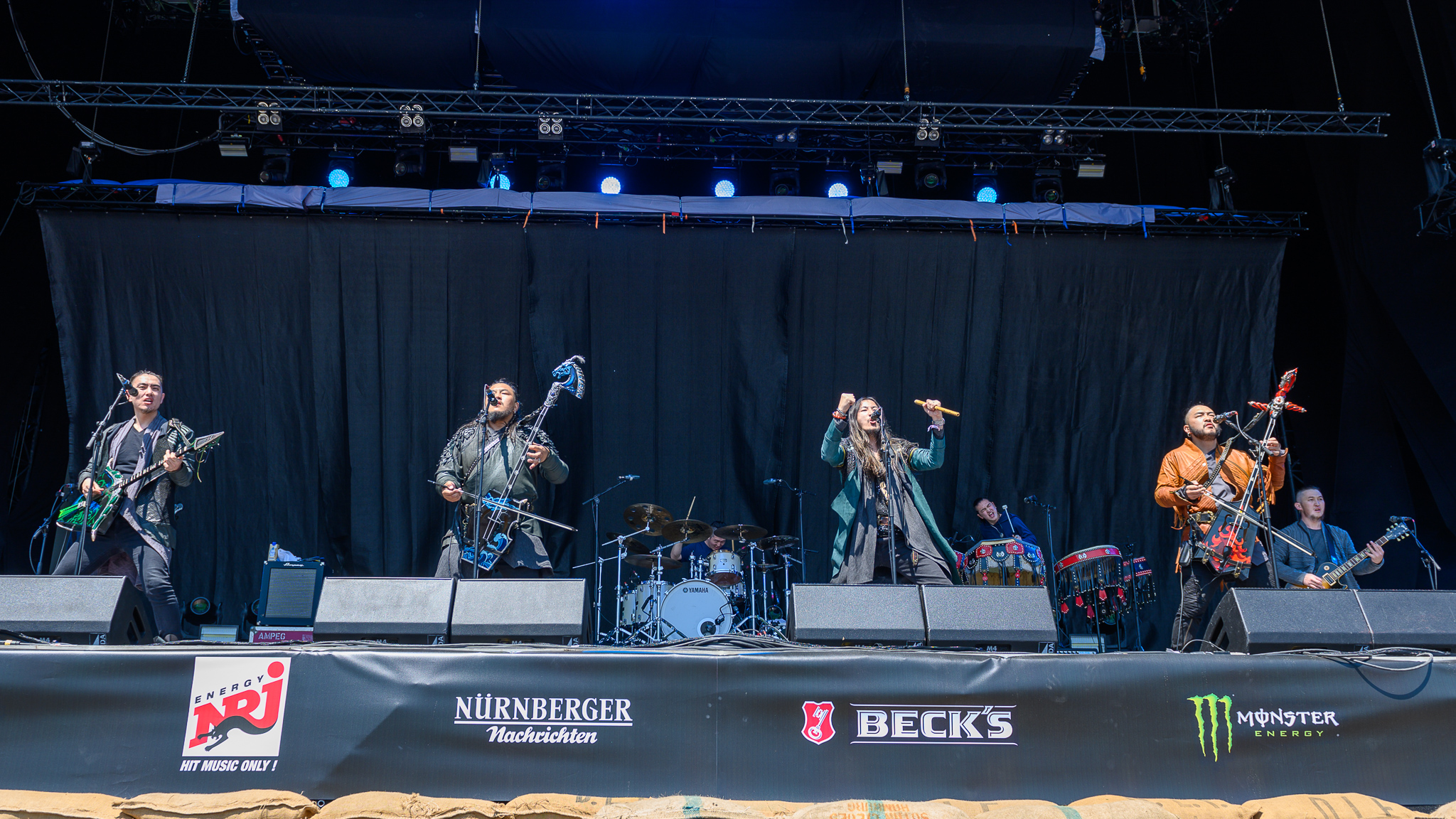
A performance of The Hu at Rock im Park 2019
- The Hu is a band formed in 2016. Hailing from Mongolia, the band blends rock and heavy metal with traditional Mongolian instrumentation, including Mongolian throat singing and the Morin khuur (also known as the horsehead fiddle). The Hu calls their style of music "hunnu rock", with hu being a Mongolian root word for "human". In 2018, the band made its debut at Download Festival in Donington. A song by the Hu, "Black Thunder", was created for the 2019 videogame Star Wars Jedi: Fallen Order. A different version of the song was then translated and recorded by the Hu from the original Mongolian to a new fictional Star Wars language created by the band, with guidance from the game's developers. This version, "Sugaan Essena", was used for the game.
- Soriah/Uger Khan is an American overtone singer, performance artist, multi-instrumentalist, and shamanic ritualist headquartered in Portland, Oregon and The Tuvan Republic. His music is a synthesis of traditional forms such as Tuvan throat singing, Shamanic music, Raga, and pre-Columbian Mexica music and language; with avant garde musical styles like Industrial, Ambient, Noise, and Goth. Likewise, his live performance is a fusion of costume and ritual from Tuva, Mexico, North American Native cultures, and Western Ceremonial Magic traditions; as well as chaos magic, butoh, and modern primitive movements of the 20th century.
- Minh Le, the co-creator of Counter-Strike and an employee in the Valve headquarters claimed Gabe Newell had practiced Mongolian throat singing for 5 months in 2000, causing employees to close the doors in the building.

== Audio examples ==
- Kargyraa.mp3
- Khoomei.mp3
- Sygyt.mp3See https://www.alashensemble.com/ for an accurate list of audio samples.

== See also ==
- Throat singing
- Music in the Tuva Republic
- List of overtone musicians § Tuva
