= Chirgilchin =

Group of Tuvan musicians

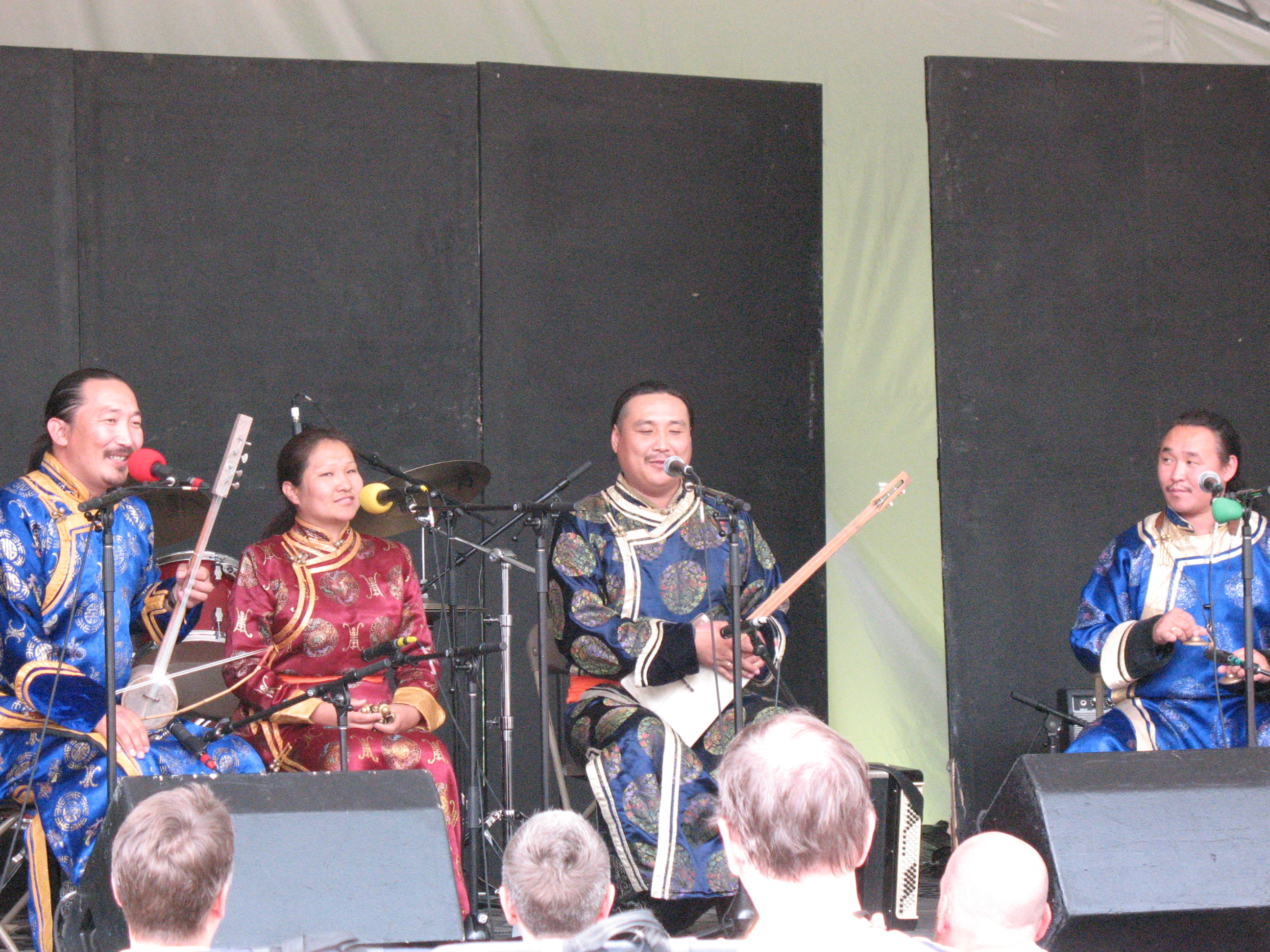
- Chirgilchin at the Winnipeg Folk Festival, July 2007

Background information
- Origin: Tuva
- Genres: Folk
- Years active: 1996–present
- Labels: Pure Nature Music, Shanachie
- Website: www.pnmartists.com/chirgilchin

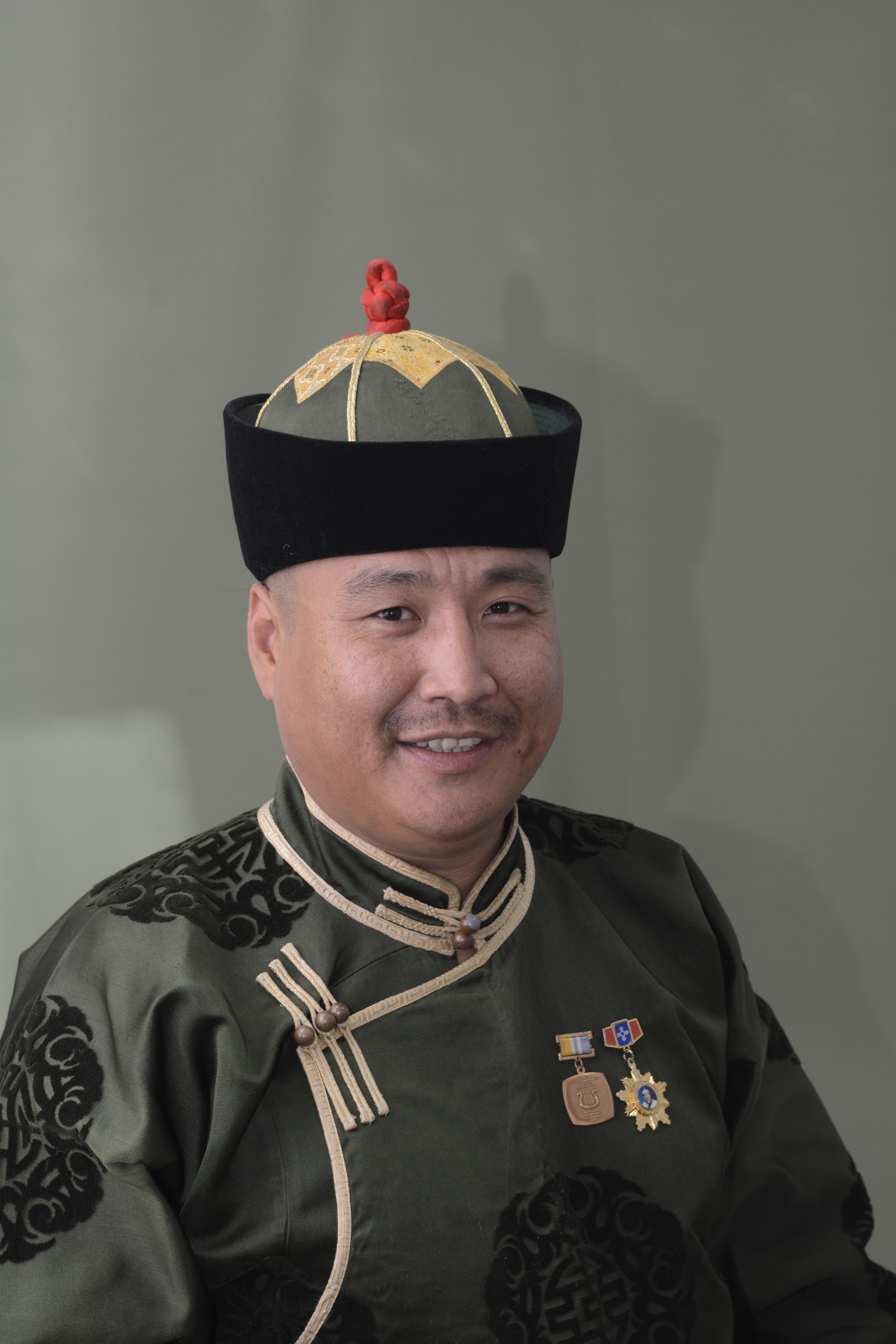
Igor Koshkendey

Chirgilchin, meaning "dance of the air in the heat of the day" or "miracle" in Tuvan, is a group of Tuvan musicians performing traditional Tuvan music. It was established in 1996.

The group consists of Igor Koshkendey, Mongun-ool Ondar, Aldar Tamdyn, and Aidysmaa Koshkendey. Igor Koshkendey won the Grand Prix of the International Throat Singing Competition in 1998, 2000, and 2002. He is an expert in the Oidupaa style, a type of kargyraa unique to the singer Vladimir Oidupaa. Mongun-ool Ondar won the Grand Prix in the 1992 International Throat Singing Competition at age 16. He is recognized as having mastered six different throat-singing styles and is working on inventing his own. Mongun-ool is a student of Oleg Kuular. Aldar Tamdyn is a renowned instrument maker and makes all the instruments the band uses. Aldar won Best Instrumentalist at the International Folk Music Festival in Tuva. He is the current director of the National Tuvan Orchestra of Traditional Instruments. Aidysmaa Koshkendey is the only female member of Chirgilchin and has won many different vocal competitions in Tuva. They collaborated with the avant-garde artist Laurie Anderson on Anderson's album Homeland. Their manager is Alexander Bapa, former member of another Tuvan music group, Huun-Huur-Tu, and brother of Sayan Bapa of this group.

In 2017, they guest performed on "Somos Anormales", a song by Puerto Rican singer Residente. Igor Koshkendey won the Latin Grammy Award for Best Urban Song for his work on "Somos Anormales".

== Albums ==
- The Wolf and the Kid 1996
- Aryskan's Wind 1999
- Ezir-Kara 2002
- Collectible 2005
- Will Teach 2006
- Pictures of Tuva 2008
- Kaldak Khamar 2009

== See also ==
- Tuvan throat singing
- Tuva
- Doshpuluur
- Igil
