= Tyva Kyzy =

Tyva Kyzy (Тыва Кызы, pronounced [tɯˈva kɯˈzɯ]) (Daughters of Tuva) is an all-female folk ensemble performing Tuvan throat-singing, under the direction of Choduraa Tumat. It is the first and only women's group in Tuva that performs all styles of Tuvan throat-singing.

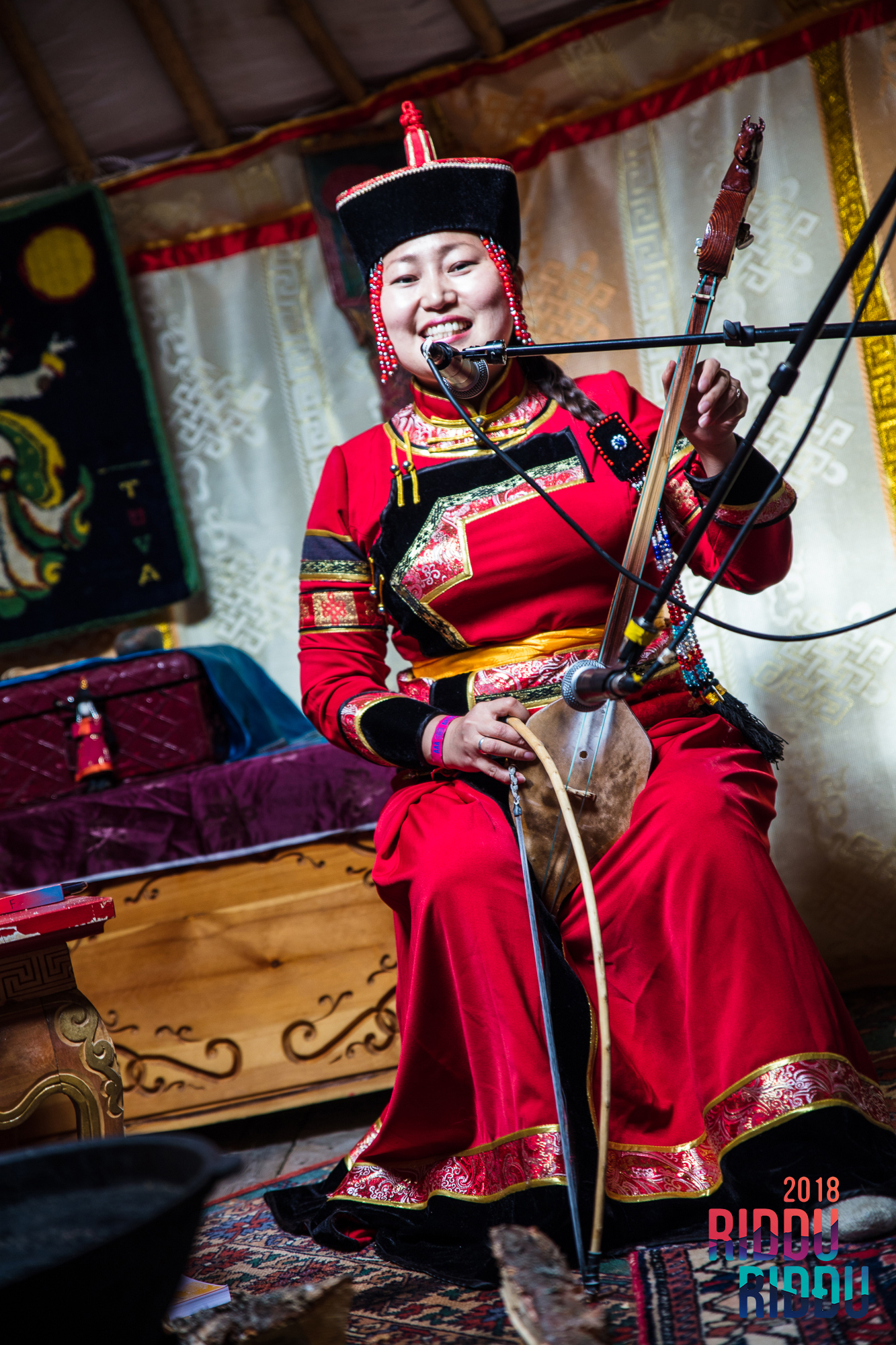
Yurtakonsert med Tyva Kyzy (41573199210)

== Background ==
There were a few female throat-singers in Tuva's history, though it was believed a woman performing throat-singing could hurt her male relatives and cause her difficulties during childbirth. Choldak-Kara Oyun, the mother of the throat singer Soruktu Kyrgys and grandmother of the husband of Tuvan actress Kara-Kys Namzatovna Munzuk, throat-sang throughout her life while milking her cows, singing lullabies to her children and sometimes while she was drinking Tuvan araga. In the Soviet era it was rare for women to perform on stage, except during Republican festivals. Valentina Salchak performed throat-singing in public in 1979.With the start of the International Symposium of Khoomei women could sing publicly there. Since its inception in 1998, Tyva Kyzy has participated in numerous international festivals of world music in Europe and Japan. They also toured the United States in October 2005.

== Non-musical activities ==
The group fosters growth, talent, and confidence in women and girls by teaching in Tuvan schools and leading workshops internationally. Their first CD, "setkilemden sergek yr-dyr" (a cheerful song from my soul) was released in March 2006. Their second CD, "igi unu - iyem unu" (the igils voice - my mothers voice) was released in 2009.
