= Alash (ensemble) =

Throat singing band from Tuva, Russia

Alash / Алаш
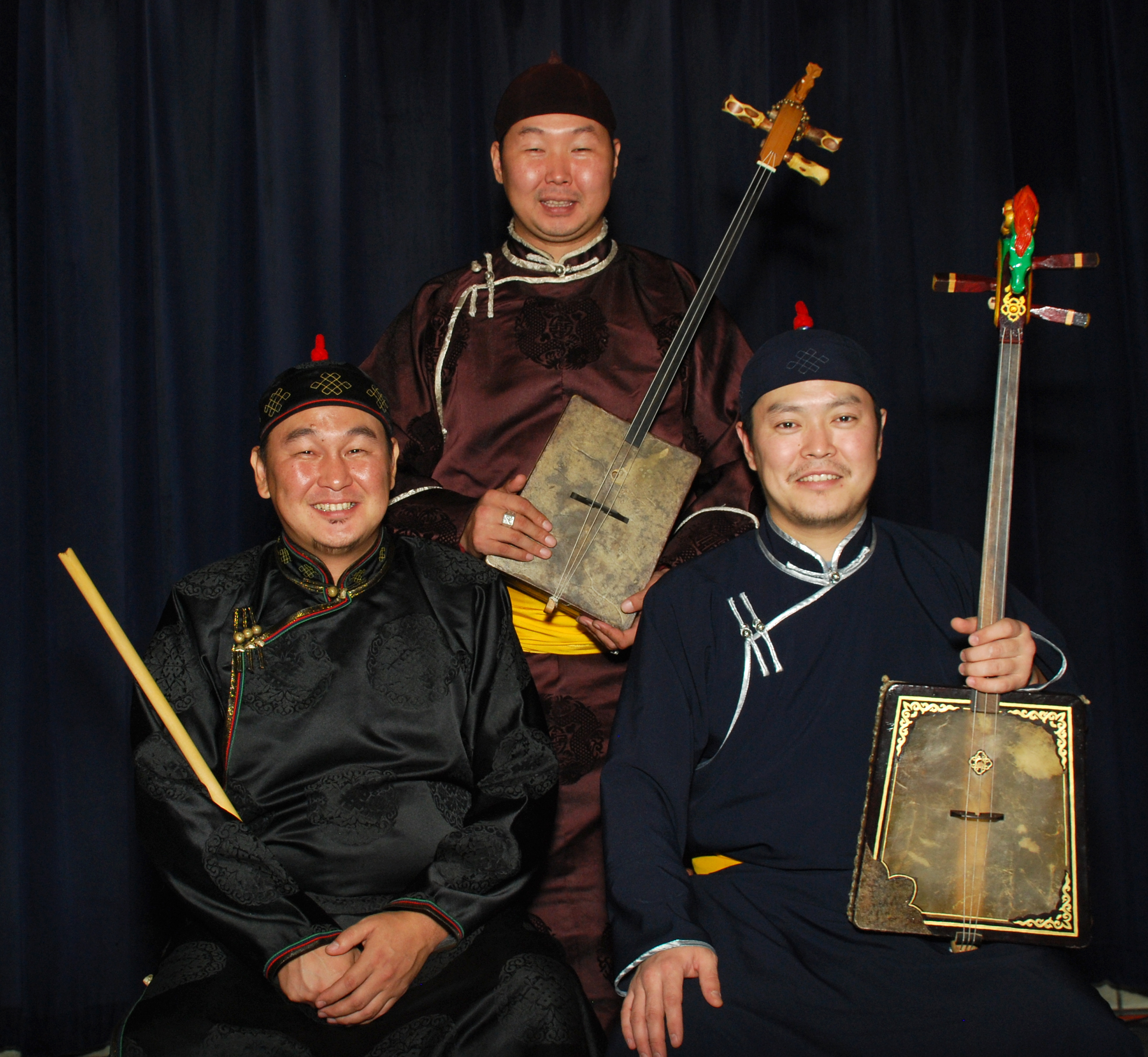
- Left to right: Ayan Shirizhik, Bady-Dorzhu Ondar, Ayan-ool Sam

Background information
- Origin: Kyzyl, Tuva
- Genres: Throat singing, Folk music
- Years active: 1999-present
- Members: Bady-Dorzhu Ondar; Ayan-ool Sam; Ayan Shirizhik
- Past members: Sergei Sotpa; Mai-ool Sedip; Nachyn Choodu; Kang-Khüler Saaia

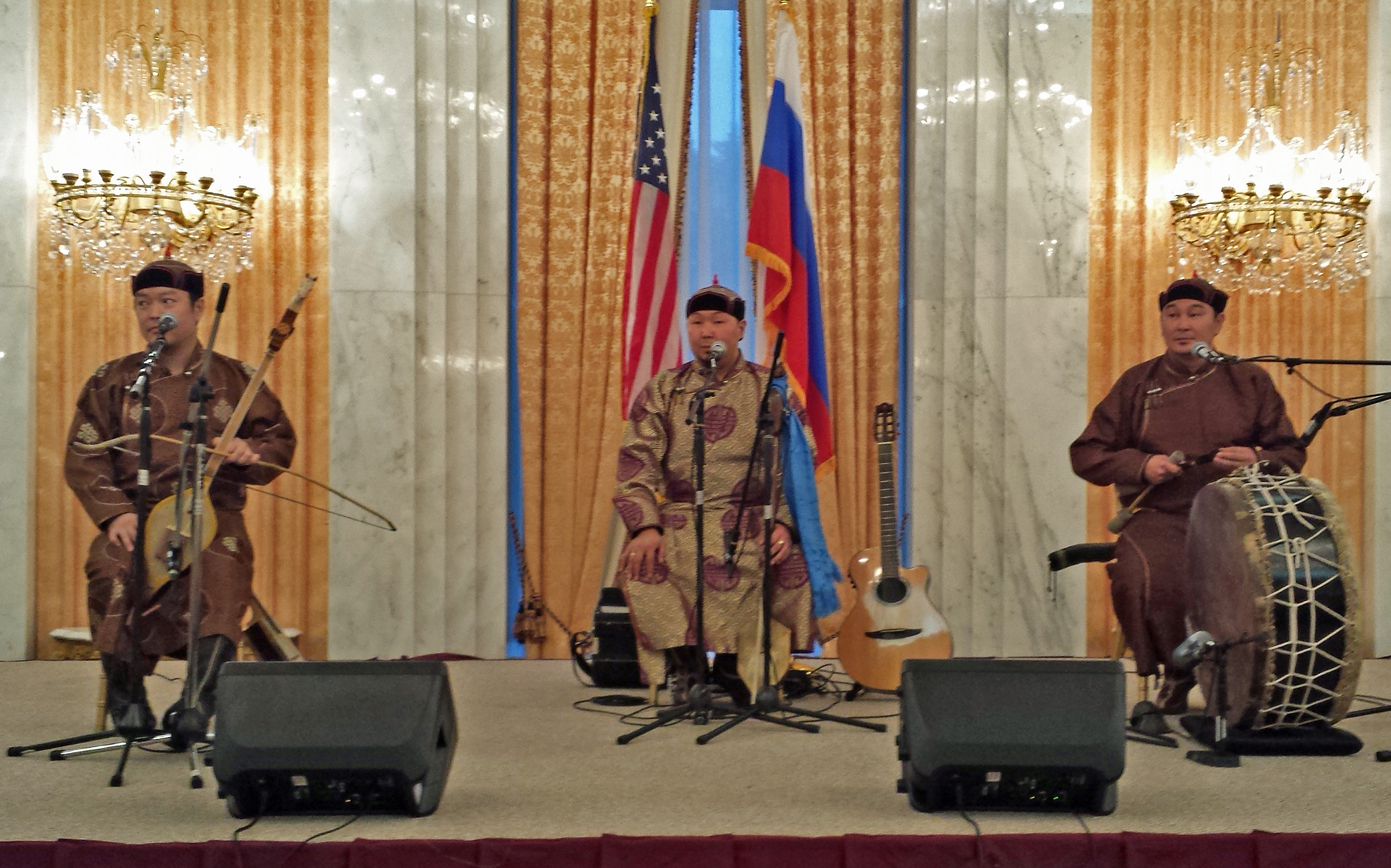
2018 04 25, Alash at the Embassy of Russia in Washington D.C.

The ensemble Alash is a throat singing band from Tuva, Russia, that performs traditional Tuvan music with some non-traditional influences.

== History ==
The musicians of Alash are Bady-Dorzhu Ondar, Ayan-ool Sam, and Ayan Shirizhik. Originally called Changy-Xaya, the group was formed at Kyzyl Arts College in 1999 and became the resident traditional ensemble. The outgrowth of this musical exploration is the ensemble Alash, which is named for the Alash River that flows through the musicians' home region of Tuva. Since its inception, Alash has undergone several personnel changes. In 2004, Alash won first prize at the International Xöömei (throat singing) Symposium competition.

Alash toured the United States in 2006 at the invitation of the Open World Leadership Center at the Library of Congress with funding from the National Endowment for the Arts. Their trip was organized by CEC ArtsLink, an organization that orchestrates cross-cultural arts exchanges and grants between the US and Central Europe, Russia, and Eurasia.

Alash has toured the United States every year since, playing at a variety of venues. They also conduct workshops at schools and colleges to share their music and culture with American young people. In winter 2008-09, Alash toured with the American group Béla Fleck and the Flecktones to promote the Flecktones' Grammy-winning holiday album Jingle All the Way, which featured Alash as guest artists. Alash joined the Flecktones again in 2025 for a reunion holiday tour.

In August 2007, the group performed for President Vladimir Putin while he was on holiday in Tuva. Alash now tours internationally in Europe and Asia as well as in the US.

== Recordings ==
- Alash Live at the Enchanted Garden March 2006
- Alash April 2007
- Jingle All the Way September 2008. Guest artists on the grammy-winning CD by the Flecktones
- Buura May 2011
- Achai Spring 2015
- Meni Mana Fall 2020 (digital only)
