= Yat-Kha =

Tuvan rock band

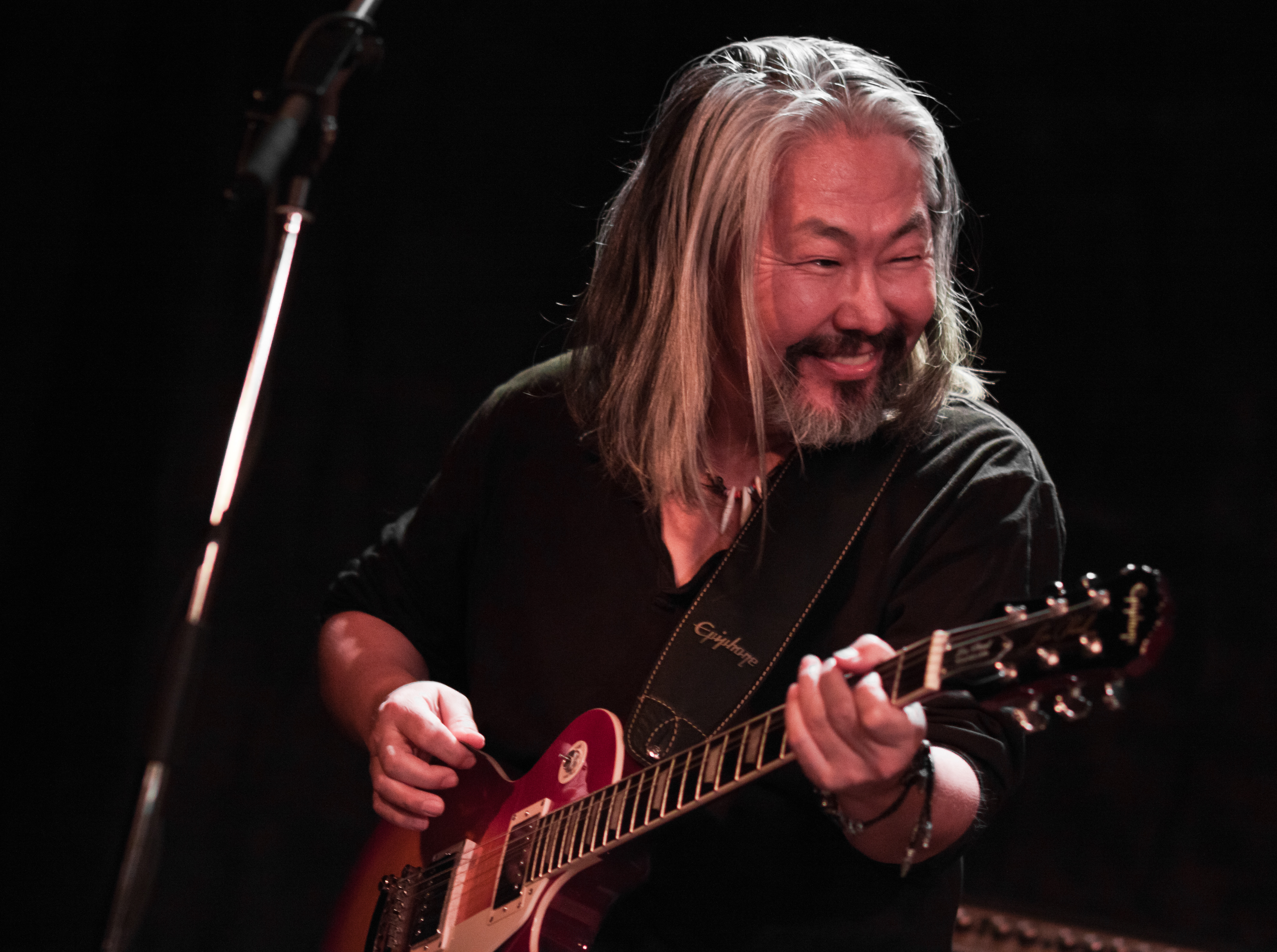
- Albert Kuvezin leading Yat-Kha in 2016

Background information
- Origin: Tuva, Russia
- Genres: Folk rock, Tuvan music, overtone singing, ethnic electronica, heavy metal
- Years active: 1991–present
- Members: Albert Kuvezin and others
- Past members: Ivan Sokolovsky and many others
- Website: http://www.yat-kha.ru/en/

Yat-Kha is a band from Tuva, led by vocalist/guitarist Albert Kuvezin. Their music is a mixture of Tuvan traditional music and rock, featuring Kuvezin's distinctive kargyraa throat singing style, the kanzat kargyraa.

== History ==
Yat-Kha was founded in Moscow in 1991, as a collaborative project between Kuvezin and Russian avant-garde, electronic composer Ivan Sokolovsky. The project blended traditional Tuvan folk music with post-modern rhythms and electronic effects. Kuvezin and Sokolovsky toured and played festivals, and eventually took the name "Yat-Kha", after the yatkha (ятха), a Tuvan bridge zither similar to the Mongolian yatga and the Chinese guzheng, which Kuvezin plays in addition to the guitar. In 1993, they released a self-titled album on the General Records label.

Since July 21 2001, they have been performing a live soundtrack to Vsevolod Pudovkin's 1928 silent film Storm Over Asia.

Their 1995 song "Karangailyg Kara Hovaa (Dyngyldai)" is featured in the Apple iPhone 15 "Titanium" commercial.

== Discography ==
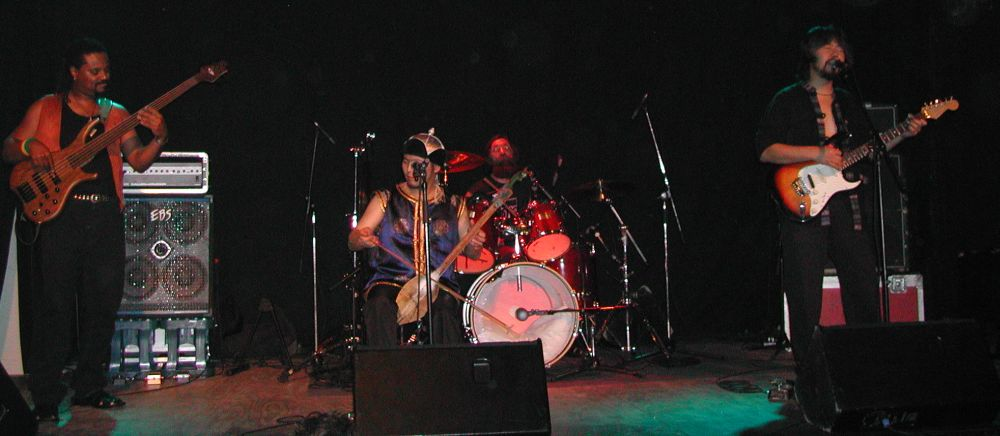
Yat-Kha in Germany, 2005

Albums:

- Priznak Gryadushchei Byedy (1991)
- Khanparty (1992)
- Yat-Kha (1993)
- Yenisei Punk (1995)
- Tundra's Ghosts (1996/97) - remastered version of Yat-Kha released by Ivan Sokolovsky)
- Dalai Beldiri (1999)
- Aldyn Dashka (2000)
- Bootleg (2001, live)
- tuva.rock (2003)
- Re-Covers (2005)
- Bootleg 2005 (2005, live)
- Poets and Lighthouses (2010)
- We Will Never Die (2021)

== Members ==
=== Current ===
- Albert Kuvezin (vocals, Throat singing, Guitar, Bass guitar, Chanzy, Khomus, Yat-Kha)
- Sholban Mongush (igil, vocal)
- "Naiys Dulush (drums)
- Khuler Lopsan (bass guitar)

=== Past ===
- Evgeny "Zhenya" Tkachov (drums, Percussion)
- Radik Tiuliush (vocals, Throat Singing, Morin Khuur, Igil)
- Sailyk Ommun (vocals, Yat-Kha)
- Makhmud Skripaltschchikov (Bass guitar)
- Aldyn-ool Sevek (vocals, Throat singing, Morin Khuur, Igil)
- Alexei Saaia (vocals, Morin khuur, Bass guitar)
- Ivan Sokolovsky (Synthesizers, Percussion)

=== Appearing on Poets and Lighthouses with Albert Kuvezin (Voice, Acoustic Guitar) ===
- Simon Edwards (Acoustic Bass guitar, Double Bass, Marimbula, Mbira, Appalachian Dulcimer)
- Giles Perring (Acoustic Guitar, Piano, Harmonium, Backing Vocals, Drums, Percussion)
- Sarah Homer (Clarinet, Bass Clarinet, Recorder)
- Melanie Pappenheim (Backing Vocals)
- Lu Edmonds (Cumbus)
- Neil Cameron (Scottish Small Pipes)

== Awards ==
- 1991 recognized by Brian Eno, one of the international judges at the first Voices of Asia Festival in Almaty, Kazakhstan
- 1995 French RFI "Decouvertes Est" prize for Yenisei Punk
- 1999 German Critic's Prize for Dalai Beldiri
- 2002 BBC Radio 3 "Award for World Music"
