= Turan (disambiguation) =

Turan is a geographic term referring to certain areas and peoples of Central Asia.

Turan may also refer to:

== Places ==
- Turan (Baluchistan), a medieval region in Pakistan
- Turan (satrapy), a satrapy of the Sassanid Empire
- Turan, a town in the Drenovë Municipality of southeastern Albania
- Turan, Azerbaijan, a village in Shaki Rayon
- Turan, Iran (disambiguation), places in Iran
- Tur'an, a local council in the North District of Israel
- Turan, Russia, several inhabited localities in Russia
- Turan Range, a mountain range in Russia
- Turan Depression, a desert basin along the Caspian Sea stretching from southern Turkmenistan through Uzbekistan to Kazakhstan
- Turan, alternative name of Fort Terán, a former settlement in Texas, United States

== People ==
- Turya (Avesta), an ethnic group mentioned in the Avesta after whom the region of Turan is named
- Turan (name), a list of people with the given name or surname
- Turan, alternative name of Toran (Pashtun tribe), a tribe in Afghanistan

== Arts and entertainment ==
- Turan ensemble, a Kazakh folk music band
- Turan (Conan), a nation in the fictional world of Conan the Barbarian
- Turan Kingdom, a kingdom in Last Exile, a Japanese animated television series

== Businesses ==
- Turan Air, an Azerbaijani airline
- Turan Corporation, the first company to specialize in Turkish and emerging-market debt
- Turan Information Agency, a news agency based in Baku, Azerbaijan

== Other uses ==
- Turan (mythology), an Etruscan goddess, roughly equivalent to the Greek Aphrodite and the Roman Venus
- Turán (periodical), a Hungarian journal
- 40M Turán I, a Hungarian tank of World War II
- Turan Tovuz, an Azerbaijani football club based in Tovuz
- FC Turan, a Kazakhstani football club
- Turan University, a private university in Almaty, Kazakhstan
- Turan railway station, a commuter rail station in İzmir, Turkey
- Turan Battalion, a Turkic volunteer battalion of the Ukrainian Armed Forces

== See also ==
- Turanism, a political movement
- Curse of Turan, a Hungarian superstition
- Turán graph, a mathematical graph
- Tourane, former name of Đà Nẵng, a port city in Vietnam
- Toran (disambiguation)
- Touran (disambiguation)
- Turian (disambiguation)
