= La Argentina (dancer) =

Spanish dancer (1890–1936)

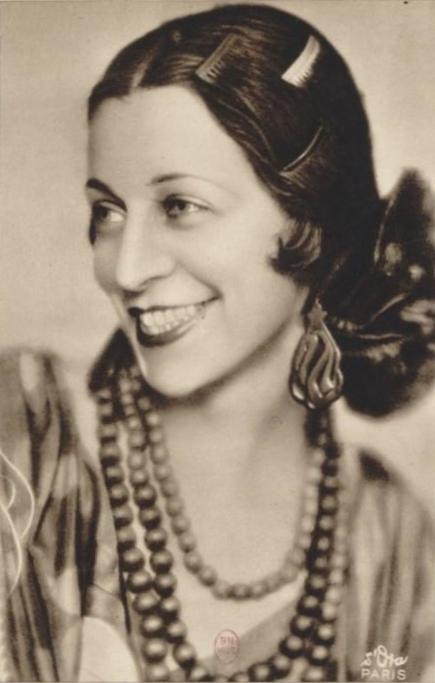
La Argentina

Antonia Mercé y Luque (September 4, 1890 – July 18, 1936), also known as La Argentina, was an Argentine-born Spanish dancer who created the neoclassical style of Spanish dance. She was widely regarded as one of the most famous Spanish dancers of the 20th century and was nicknamed the "Queen of the Castanets" and the "Flamenco Pavlova".

== Biography ==
=== Early life ===
Antonia Mercé y Luque, known by her stage name La Argentina, was born in Buenos Aires, Argentina, to professional Spanish dancers Manuel Mercé and Josefina Luque. At the age of four, she began her dance career in classical ballet, primarily trained by her father. She made her debut performance at the Teatro Real in Madrid, Spain, at the age of nine, and became a principal dancer at the Madrid Opera by the age of eleven. After the death of her father, at the age of 14, La Argentina retired from ballet and began studying native Spanish dances with her mother.

=== Career ===
At the beginning of her career, La Argentina faced disapproval from society for her folkloristic dancing style, which prevented her from performing in theaters and concerts. She performed in venues accessible to her, such as café chantants and popular music halls.

Before World War I, La Argentina traveled to Paris, where she performed at various prominent locations like the Moulin Rouge and the Théâtre des Champs-Élysées. Later on, she developed an interest in a Romani-style dance and adapted it into her own style. Her rendition of this dance style inspired Metropolitan Opera star Rosa Ponselle to prepare the dances for her own choreography of Bizet's opera Carmen under La Argentina's guidance in 1935. Throughout her career, La Argentina embarked on six tours in North America, often accompanied by flamenco guitarist Carlos Montoya.

=== Death ===
On July 18, 1936, La Argentina died at the age of 45 in Bayonne, France.

== Contribution to modern Spanish dance ==
La Argentina's contributions to modern Spanish dance include her unique style, music selection, use of castanets, and the way she structured her performances.

=== Style ===
Edwige Feuillère expressed her admiration for La Argentina's classical formation, knowledge, and taste, which brought dignity and nobleness to Spanish folklore. Serge Lifar acknowledged La Argentina's contribution to the history of formal dance, which began in 1920 with her and Vicente Escudero, according to him. La Argentina created her own style by reviving forgotten traditions and seeking out traditional steps from village squares and humble dance schools. She refined and pruned each pattern of steps, keeping only what was essential to conform to her own aesthetic, which combined the purity of classical style with the ardor and character of popular art. La Argentina believed that stylized dance should retain the nature and flavor of folklore while respecting the demands of the stage, such as creating space, accentuating movement, and fitting different parts into the whole.

=== Music ===
La Argentina incorporated music from contemporary Spanish composers such as Isaac Albéniz, de Falla, Granados, and Turina into her Spanish dance performances. These composers' music demanded broad choral movements that were not present in traditional folkloric dances. She also worked with young Spanish composers, including Ernesto Halffter, Óscar Esplá, and Duran, to create new scores. Accompanied by notable pianists such as Joaquin Nin, Amparo Navaro, Carmencita Perez, Miguel Berdion, and Luis Galve. La Argentina used a variety of music that suited her performances.

==== Castanets ====
La Argentina started using castanets at a very young age, around three or four. Later on, she developed her own method to obtain more pleasing sounds from the instrument and even modified the design of castanets. Her approach to playing the castanets was so influential that other Spanish artists began to adopt her musical notation for this instrument.

=== Recital format ===
Argentina was a pioneer in the recital format, performing her own choreography for concerts with only a pianist or occasionally a guitarist. Salvador Ballesteros, a family friend, served as her guitarist throughout her career. She gradually transitioned from performing in variety programs and pieces with orchestral music to dances where less importance was given to the orchestra. Her first shows in 1925 were during a European tour and she performed in the South of France, where she shared the stage with other artists. Her first solo recital was in Berlin in 1926, and she continued performing in the same format in various venues around the world, including the Salle Gaveau, Théâtre Femina, Salle Pleyel, Théâtre des Champs-Elysées, Paris Opera, Opéra-Comique, the old Trocadéro, all in Paris, and the Imperial Theatre in Tokyo. Her popular shows at the Trocadéro drew large crowds, and she continued to perform there to great acclaim.

== Main creations ==
1. Concert dances

The following is a list of dances and their corresponding music that she created:

- 1912 El Garrotin, based on a popular song La Corrida, music by Valverde (taken from choreographies created in 1910 for the opérette L’Amour en Espagne, Tango Andalou, music by Ballesteros).
- 1916 Danse des Yeux verts, music specially composed by Granados
- Between 1916 and 1921: Habanera, music by Pablo de Sarasate, Cordoba, music by Albeniz, Danza V, music by Granados
- 1921, Sevilla, music by Albeniz; Serenata, music by Malats; Sérénade Andalouse, music by C. Ruecker
- 1925 Danse du Feu, music by Manuel de Falla, Andalouse Sentimentale, music by Turina, Boléro Classique, music by Iradier Bohémiene, based on a popular song Seguidilla (without music).
- 1926 Mexico, based on a popular air, Ciel de Cuba, based on a popular song
- 1927 Valencia, music by C. Ruecker Chaconne, music by Albeniz
- 1928 Serenata Andaluza, music by Manuel de Falla, Jota Valenciana, music by Granados, Danse Gitane, music by Infante Alcoreta, music by Guerrero
- 1929, La Vie Brève, music by de Falla, Cariñosa, popular music from the Philippines, Jota Aragonesa, music by de Falla
- 1930 Goyescas, music by Granados; Danse Ibérienne, music specially composed by Joaquín Nin; Danse de la Meunière, music by de Falla
- 1932 Almería, music by Albéniz, La Romeria de los Cornudos, music by Pittaluga (The Shawl Dance, a dance from Granada). Puerta de Tierra, music by Albeniz, Danse du Meunier, music by de Falla, Légende, music by Albeniz, Charrada, popular music from Salamanca, Malaguena, music by Albeniz, Castilla, music by Albeniz, "Matid 1 800". Cuba, music by Albeniz, Alegrias, music by Ballesteros
- 1933 Zapateado, music by Granados, Tientos, music by Infante
- 1934 Sacro-Monte, music by Turina, Esquisse Gitane, music by Infante, La Fregona, music by Vives, Suite Argentina, based on a popular air (Condicion-Bailecito-Zamba). Suite Andalouse, based on popular songs (Sevillanas-Peteneras-Bulerias).
- 1935 Fandango, music by Turina, Polo Gitano, music by Breton
- 1936: La Firmeza, based on Argentinian popular music, the last dance in the Suite Argentina.

2. Ballets

In 1925, Manuel de Falla composed the music for the ballet ''El amor brujo''. El Fandango de Candi was choreographed in 1927 with music by Duran. La Argentina danced in a pink costume with cubist flounces cut into scallops, expressing feminine shrewdness, thwarted love, and tenderness. Also in 1927, a flamenco dance called Au coeur de Seville was performed, featuring a popular air.

Ernesto Halffter composed the music for Sonatine in 1928. La Argentina danced in this ballet, which mixed elements of Old France and Castilla and featured a shepherdess gliding and pirouetting imperceptibly.

In 1928, Óscar Esplá composed the music for Le Contrebandier, a ballet featuring the future Empress Eugénie and the countess of Teba.

Juerga, choreographed in 1928 by Julien Bautista, depicted scenes of popular life in Madrid around 1885, with young people from good families mingling with common folk and engaging in unrestrained jollity. Triana, composed by Albeniz in 1929, depicted lovers' quarrels, set during the Corpus Christi festival in Sevilla.

== Awards ==
La Argentina was recognized for her contributions to modern dance with several prestigious awards. She was awarded the French Légion d'honneur and the Spanish Orden de Isabel la Católica.

== See also ==
- List of dancers
