= Overtone singing =

Style of multiphonic singing

Polyphonic overtone singing Pachelbel's Canon, performed by Wolfgang Saus

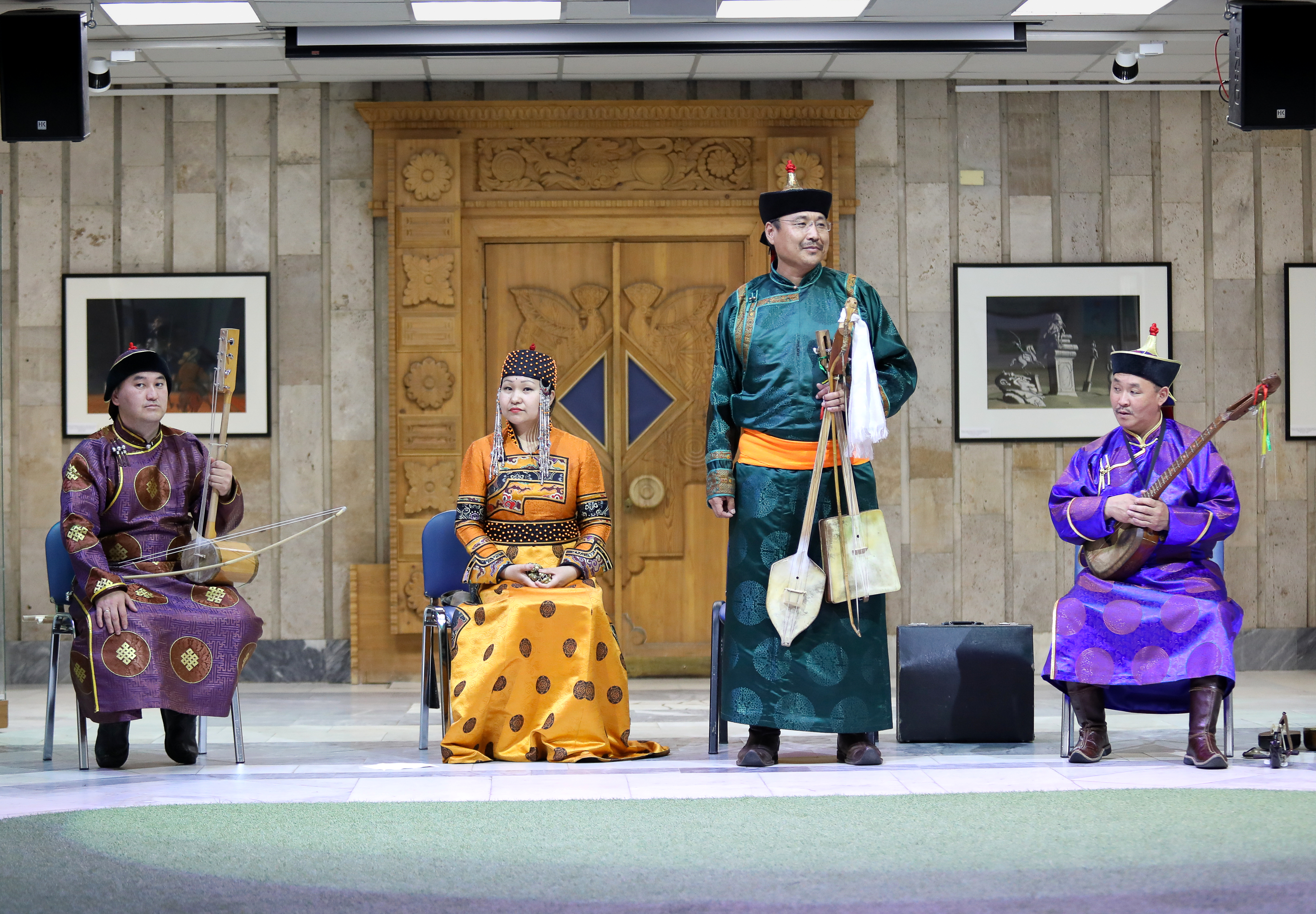
Chirgilchin performing various styles of Tuvan throat singing.

Overtone singing, also known as overtone chanting, harmonic singing, polyphonic overtone singing, or diphonic singing, is a singing technique in which the vocalist produces two distinct pitches at the same time.

From a fundamental pitch made by a human voice, harmonic overtones can be selectively amplified through manipulating the dimensions and the shape of the resonant cavities of the mouth and the pharynx.

Overtone singing should not be confused with throat singing, although many throat singing techniques include overtone singing. While overtone singing involves careful manipulation of the vocal tract, throat singing mostly involves the voice source.

== Asia ==
=== Mongolia and Buryatia ===
It is thought that the art of overtone singing originated in regions of central Asia, including Tuva, Altai, and Mongolia. Overtone singing can be found throughout Mongolia, which is often considered the world's most active area. The most commonly practiced style, (Cyrillic: хөөмий), comes in these varieties:

- Uruulyn / labial khöömii
- Tagnain / palatal khöömii
- Khamryn / nasal khöömii
- Bagalzuuryn, khooloin / glottal, throat khöömii
- Tseejiin khondiin, khevliin / chest cavity, stomach khöömii
- Turlegt, khosmoljin khöömii / khöömii combined with long song

Mongolians also have many other singing styles, such as karkhiraa (literally, "growling") and isgeree.

=== Tuva ===
Tuvan overtone singing is practiced in the Republic of Tuva (southern Siberia, Russia).

The Tuvan method of singing overtones is based on appreciation of complex sounds with multiple layers or textures. Tuvans have developed a wide range of rhythmic and melodic styles. Most are sung with korekteer (literally, "with chest voice"). Styles include:

- Khöömei
- Sygyt
- Kargyraa (which also uses a second sound source made by false vocal folds called "false-folds-diplophony")

Other sub-styles include:

- Borbangnadyr
- Chylandyk
- Dumchuktaar
- Ezengileer
- Byrlang (a unique type of vibrato, mainly applied to khöömei and kargyraa styles)

The melodies are traditionally created by using the 6th, 8th, 9th, 10th, 12th, 13th and sometimes the 16th harmonics, which form the major pentatonic scale, so the 7th and 11th harmonics are carefully skipped.

The most peculiar melody from the Tuvan tradition is "Artii Sayir", mostly performed in kargyraa style.

=== Altai and Khakassia ===
Tuva's neighbouring Russian regions, the Altai Republic to the west and Khakassia to the northwest, have developed forms of throat singing called kai (Altay: кай, qay) or khai (Khakas: хай, xay). In Altai, this is used mostly for epic poetry, with the instrumental accompaniment of a topshur. Altai narrators (kai-chi) perform in kargyraa, khöömei, and sygyt styles, which are similar to those in Tuva. They also have their own style with very high harmonics, related to kargyraa. Variations of kai are:

- Karkyra
- Sybysky
- Homei
- Sygyt

The first well-known kai-chi was Alexei Kalkin.

=== Chukchi Peninsula ===
The Chukchi people of the Chukchi Peninsula in the extreme northeast of Russia also practice a form of throat singing.

=== Tibet ===
Tibetan Buddhist chanting is a subgenre of throat singing, mainly practiced by monks of Tibet, including Khokhonor (Qinghai) province in the Tibetan Plateau area, Tibetan monks of Nepal, Bhutan, India, and various locations in the Himalayan region. Most often the chants hold to the lower pitches possible in throat singing. Various ceremonies and prayers call for throat singing in Tibetan Buddhism, often with more than one monk chanting at a time. There are various Tibetan throat singing styles, such as Gyuke (Standard Tibetan: རྒྱུད་སྐད་ Wylie: rgyud skad), which uses the lowest pitch of voice; Dzoke (མཛོ་སྐད་ mdzo skad); and Gyer (གྱེར་ gyer).

=== Uzbekistan and Kazakhstan ===
The poet-musicians of Kazakhstan and the Uzbek region of Karakalpakstan, known as zhirau, employ throat singing in their epic poetry recitations, accompanied by the dombra. Zhirau singers believe that the ability to throat-sing is an innate gift of selected Kazakhs, and that it cannot be taught.

Besides zhirau, there is another form of throat singing, "Kömeimen än aituw (Көмеймен ән айту)", in Kazakhstan. This technique is similar to throat singing in Altai Republic. Kömeimen än aituw is being revived by the Kazakh ethno-folk musical bands HasSak and Turan ensemble, after Kazakhs believed that this form of throat singing might have died out because of Russian conquest.

=== Pakistan, Iran, and Afghanistan ===
Balochi Nur Sur is one of the ancient forms of overtone singing and is still popular in parts of Pakistan, Iran, and Afghanistan, especially the Sulaiman Mountains.

=== Kurdistan ===
Dengbêj, the Kurdish-Yazidi style of bardic chanting, often incorporates overtones as part of the chant, and in a way which is distinct from other forms of overtone singing. Nick Hobbs's 2020 article "Dengbêj—Kurdish long song and overtone singing" discusses the use of overtones in dengbêj in detail. Dengbêj is largely a traditional style of Turkish Kurdistan and practitioners are mostly Anatolian. Dengbêj singers often also sing Kurdish folk song but overtones can rarely be heard in Kurdish traditional music outside of dengbêj.

== Europe ==
=== Sardinia ===
On the island of Sardinia (Italy), especially in the subregion of Barbagia, one of the two styles of polyphonic singing is marked by the use of throat singing. This kind of choir is called "singing a tenore". The other style, known as cuncordu, does not use throat singing. Cantu a Tenore is practiced by groups of four male singers, each of whom has a distinct role; the 'oche or boche (pronounced /oke/ or /boke/, "voice") is the solo voice, while the mesu 'oche or mesu boche ("half voice"), contra ("against"), and bassu ("bass")—listed in descending pitch order—form a chorus (another meaning of tenore). Boche and mesu boche sing in a regular voice, while contra and bassu sing with the false vocal folds, just like the Tuvan Khoomei and Kargyraa techniques. In 2005, Unesco classed the cantu a tenore as an intangible world heritage. The best-known groups who perform a Tenore are from Bitti, Orosei, Oniferi, and Neoneli. Each town has usually more than one group, and its name is based on a specific place or monument and its hometown, for example Tenore Su Remediu (place) de Orosei (town).

=== Northern Europe ===
The Sami people of the northern parts of Sweden, Norway, Finland, and the Kola Peninsula in Russia have a singing genre called yoik. While overtone techniques are not a defining feature of yoik, its singers sometimes use them.

=== Bashkortostan ===
The Bashkirs of Bashkortostan, Russia, have a style of overtone singing called özläü (sometimes spelled uzlyau; Bashkort Өзләү), which has nearly died out. Bashkorts also sing uzlyau while playing the kurai flute, a national instrument. This technique of vocalizing into a flute can also be found in folk music as far west as the Balkans and Hungary.

=== Andalusia ===
In Flamenco's Cante Jondo singers often include overtonal color at the end of phrases. This may have originated as a way of facilitating sustain and then become an appreciated ornamentation in its own right. Carmen Linares and Duquende, among others, often incorporate overtones.

== Africa ==
=== South Africa ===
Some Thembu Xhosa women of South Africa have a low, rhythmic style of throat-singing, similar to the Tuvan Kargyraa style, called umngqokolo. It is often accompanied by call-and-response vocals and complicated polyrhythms.

== Non-traditional styles ==
=== Canada, United States, and Europe ===
The 1920s Texan singer of cowboy songs Arthur Miles independently created a style of overtone singing, similar to sygyt, as a supplement to the yodeling of country western music. Blind Willie Johnson, also of Texas, is not a true overtone singer according to National Geographic, but his ability to shift from guttural grunting noises to a soft lullaby is suggestive of the tonal timbres of overtone singing.

Starting in the 1960s, some Western musicians collaborated with traditional throat singers and/or ventured into throat singing themselves. Some made original musical contributions. As harmonics are universal to all physical sounds, the notion of authenticity is best understood in terms of musical quality. Musicians of note in this genre include Collegium Vocale Köln (which began using this technique in 1968), Michael Vetter, Trần Quang Hải, David Hykes, Jill Purce, Jim Cole, Ry Cooder, Paul Pena (mixing traditional Tuvan style with American blues), Steve Sklar, and Kiva (specializing in jazz/world beat genres and composing for overtone choirs). Others include composer Baird Hersey and his group Prana with Krishna Das (overtone singing and Hindu mantra) and Canadian songwriter Nathan Rogers, who teaches Tuvan throat singing in Winnipeg.

Paul Pena was featured in the documentary Genghis Blues, which tells the story of his pilgrimage to Tuva to compete in its annual throat-singing competition. The film won the documentary award at the 1999 Sundance Film Festival, and was nominated for an Oscar in 2000.

Tuvan singer Sainkho Namtchylak has collaborated with free jazz musicians such as Evan Parker and Ned Rothenberg. Lester Bowie and Ornette Coleman have worked with the Tenores di Bitti and Eleanor Hovda has written a piece using the Xhosa style of singing. DJs and performers of electronic music like the KLF have also merged their music with throat singing, overtone singing, or the theory of harmonics behind it.

Trần Quang Hải, a researcher on overtone singing since 1969 in Paris, France, has published many articles, videos on overtone singing from 1971. His 1989 film The Song of Harmonics, directed by Hugo Zemp, won prizes in Estonia, France, and Canada.

David Hykes founded Harmonic Chant in New York in 1975, the year he also founded his group, the Harmonic Choir, considered one of the world's preeminent overtone ensembles.

Wolfgang Saus of Germany is considered one of Europe's major teachers/performers of "polyphonic overtone singing". His skills make him instantly recognizable. Trained as a classical baritone, he is also a composer and arranger of polyphonic overtone singing music for solo voice and choirs.

A cappella singer Avi Kaplan has done overtone singing during his group Pentatonix's performances. He merged throat singing with a cappella dubstep.

The Overtone Choir Spektrum, of Prague, Czech Republic, is unique among overtone choirs, particularly because it connects traditional choir singing with overtone techniques. It is the only one of its kind in the Czech Republic, and one of only a few in the world.

MuOM Ecstatic Voices is another unique overtone singing choir. It combines in its own compositions, Western overtone singing, and Tuvan/Mongolian throat singing techniques (such as kargyraa, khoomei, sygyt, ezengiler, and bonbarnadyr). Created in Barcelona in 2008, with eight singers on average, it specializes in the creation of overtone polyphony (each singer emits an overtone) and the polyphony of the fundamentals, creating two distinguishable sound planes.

Sherden Overtone Choir was founded in 2016 in Sardinia by Ilaria Orefice and Giovanni Bortoluzzi. The choir combines Tuvan throat-singing styles with Sardinian throat-singing.

Contemporary multi-instrumentalist performer The Suitcase Junket employs a self-taught overtone singing or throat-singing technique.

Several contemporary classical composers have incorporated overtone singing into their works. Karlheinz Stockhausen was one of the first, with Stimmung in 1968. Trần Quang Hải, a French national of Vietnamese origin, wrote "Về Nguồn" with the Vietnamese composer Nguyễn Văn Tường in 1975. "Past Life Melodies" for SATB chorus by Australian composer Sarah Hopkins also calls for this technique. In Tan Dun's Water Passion after St. Matthew, the soprano and bass soloists sing in a variety of techniques, including overtone singing of the Mongolian style.

In 2014 German singer Anna-Maria Hefele went viral on YouTube with her "polyphonic overtone" singing. The Huffington Post wrote of her "amazing ability", calling her singing "utterly bizarre". On 10 October 2014, she was number two on The Guardian's Viral Video Chart, with the video Polyphonic Overtone Singing, in which Hefele demonstrates and explains overtones.

Istanbul-based British singer Nikolai Galen incorporates overtones into his experimental work. They can be heard on his solo album Emanuel Vigeland, the Black Paintings album Screams and Silence and the Hoca Nasreddin album A Headful of Birds.

== See also ==
- Human voice
- List of overtone musicians
