= Mounds valley of Eastern Scythia =

- Interactive map of Mounds valley of Eastern Scythia
- 52°05′45″N 93°42′39″E

This site, informally known as "the Siberian Valley of the Kings", revealed a thousand earthen or stone-built mounds built by Scythians in the IX - VII centuries BC and revered by the local population since then.
It is located about 15km from Turan and from the border between Russia and Tuva.

The study of this site began in 1915–1916 with the first excavations by Alexander Vasilyevich Adrianov.

In 2021, a Polish-Russian team discovered the remains of a woman with a gold pectoral ornament and a bronze mirror.
