= Hefele =

Hefele is a German surname. Notable people with the surname include:

- Anna-Maria Hefele, German singer
- Karl Josef von Hefele (1809–1893), German Catholic bishop and theologian
- Michael Hefele (born 1990), German footballer
