= Turian (disambiguation) =

Turian is a fictional alien species in the Mass Effect video game franchise.

Turian may also refer to:

- Turian-Chay State Reserve, in Azerbaijan
- Mike Turian (fl. 1997–2004), American professional Magic: The Gathering player
- Roland Turian (fl. 1948), Swiss Olympic fencer
- Bedros Tourian, alternatively Petros Duryan, Turian (1851–1872), famous Armenian poet, playwright and actor
- Leon Tourian or Turian (1879–1933), Armenian Archbishop, primate of the Eastern Diocese of the Armenian Apostolic Church of America, assassinated in New York
- Yeghishe Tourian of Jerusalem, also Turian, Armenian Patriarch 1921 to 1929

== See also ==
- Tourian (disambiguation)
- Turan (disambiguation)
- Turin (disambiguation)
- Turina, a surname
- Turieno, a town in the municipality of Camaleño, Cantabria, Spain
- Turiyan, a village in Iran
