= Cendrós =

Cendrós is a Catalan surname. Notable people with the name include:

- Maria Remei Canals i Cendrós (1914–2010), known as Maria Canals, Spanish pianist
- Pau Cendrós (born 1987), Spanish footballer
