= Keydong Thuk-Che-Cho-Ling Nunnery =

The Keydong Thuk-Che-Cho-Ling Nunnery is the first Tibetan Institution to provide higher education for Buddhist nuns. This practice is a traditional way to purify the mind, and includes visualizations, verse recitations, distinction and beautiful overtone chanting, all complemented by heartfelt prayer.

Nuns from Keydong were among the first to learn the sacred art of mandala (a practice previously restricted to monks). A mandala is a graphic representation of the perfected environment of an enlightened being. A mandala can be read as a bird's-eye view of a celestial palace, with a highly complex and beautiful architecture adorned with symbols and images that represent both the nature of reality and the order of an enlightened mind. At a deeper level, a mandala is a visual metaphor for the path to enlightenment: its viewers ‘enter’ a world artfully designed to evoke attitudes and understandings of their deepest nature. First Tibetan Buddhist nuns in history to embark on the sacred journey of mandala building, and for their ancient tradition of providing sanctuary for cows and sheep that escape from slaughterhouses near their Kathmandu convent, the Nunnery received the Courage of Conscience Award from the Peace Abbey.

More recently, the nuns have been learning the art of mani, an oral storytelling tradition that communicates the spiritual and cultural values of Tibetan Buddhism to lay audiences and threatens to go into extinction without this important revival.
