= Piy-Khemsky District =

Piy-Khemsky District Пий-Хемский кожуун (Russian)
- District

Other transcription(s)
  - Tuvan: Бии-Хем кожуун
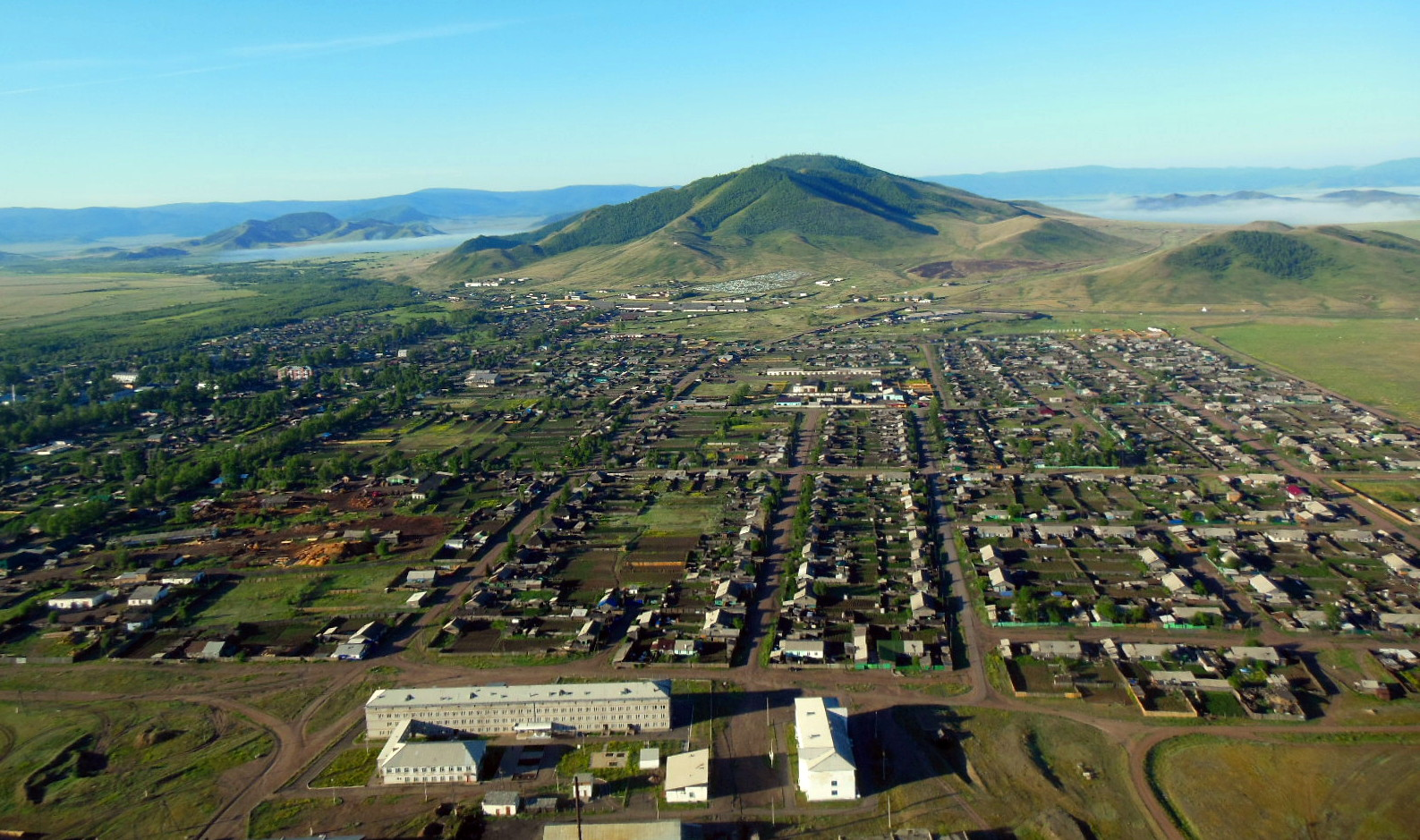
- Town of Turan, Piy-Khemsky District

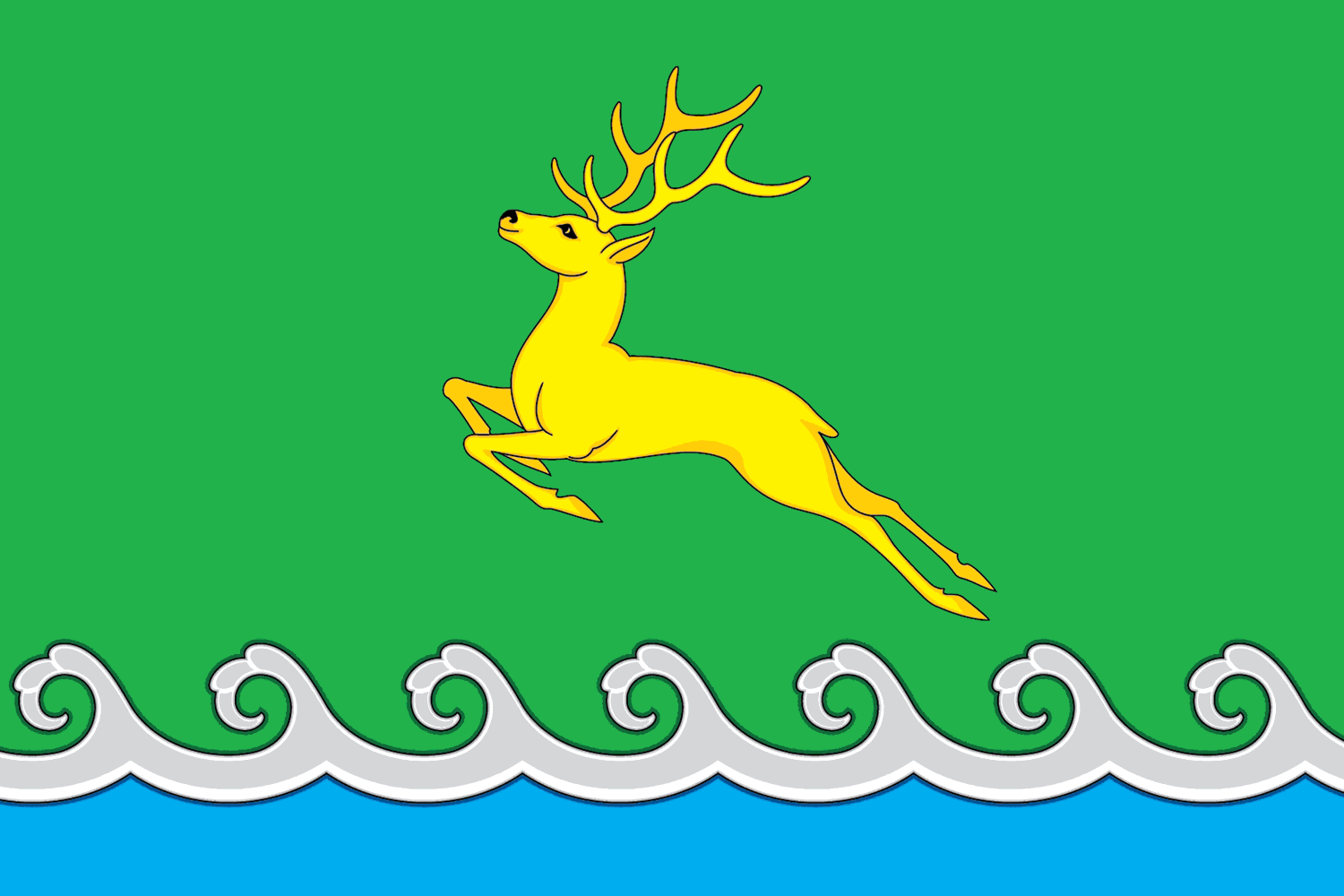
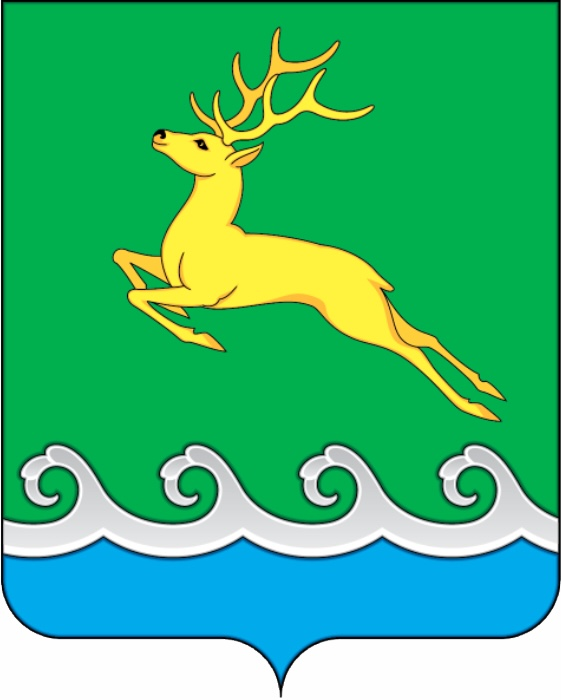
- Flag Coat of arms
- Location of Piy-Khemsky District in the Tuva Republic
- Coordinates: 52.228°N 92.853°E
- Country: Russia
- Federal subject: Tuva Republic
- Administrative center: Turan

Area
  - Total: 9,200 km^{2} (3,600 sq mi)

Population (2010 Census)
  - Total: 10,092
  - Density: 1.1/km^{2} (2.8/sq mi)
  - Urban: 49.4%
  - Rural: 50.6%

Administrative structure
  - Administrative divisions: 1 Towns under district jurisdiction (urban settlements), 7 Sumons
  - Inhabited localities: 1 cities/towns, 13 rural localities

Municipal structure
  - Municipally incorporated as: Piy-Khemsky Municipal District
  - Municipal divisions: 1 urban settlements, 7 rural settlements
- Time zone: UTC+7 (MSK+4)
- OKTMO ID: 93635000
- Website: http://xn----jtbhccdfpwz5b.xn--p1ai/

Piy-Khemsky District (Russian: Пий-Хе́мский кожуун; Tuvan: Бии-Хем кожуун, Bii-Xem kojuun) is an administrative and municipal district (raion, or kozhuun), one of the seventeen in the Tuva Republic, Russia. It is located in the north of the republic. The area of the district is 9,200 square kilometers (3,600 sq mi). Its administrative center is the town of Turan, Tuva Republic. Population: 10,092 (2010 census); 11,431 (2002 Census); 14,236 (1989 Soviet census). The population of Turan accounts for 49.4% of the district's total population.
