= Tourian =

Tourian, alternative writing Turian is a common family name in Armenian.

It may refer to:

== Persons ==
- Bedros Tourian, alternatively Petros Duryan, Turian (1851–1872), famous Armenian poet, playwright and actor
- Leon Tourian or Turian (1879–1933), Armenian Archbishop, primate of the Eastern Diocese of the Armenian Apostolic Church of America, assassinated in New York
- Yeghishe Tourian of Jerusalem, also Turian, Armenian Patriarch 1921 to 1929

== Fiction ==
- Tourian, a central base on planet Zebes in the fictional Metroid series

== Locations ==
- Tourian, Iran, a village in Hormozgan Province, Iran

== See also ==
- Turian (disambiguation)
