= Arthur Miles (country singer) =

American singer-songwriter

Arthur R "Mockingbird" Miles (August 28, 1904 – June 15, 1984) was an American singer of cowboy songs in the 1920s. He died in Loraine, Texas.

Born in Jasper, Texas, Miles is credited with independently utilizing a style of overtone singing, similar to the Tuvan style called sygyt, as a supplement to the normal yodeling of Country Western music.

Two recordings from 1929 exist that are attributed to Miles. The recordings are the first and second parts of a tune titled "Lonely Cowboy".
