= Maria Canals (pianist) =

Spanish pianist

Maria Canals as a young woman, learning to play the piano

Maria Remei Canals i Cendrós (March 12, 1914 – July 28, 2010) was a Spanish pianist and music educator from Barcelona who founded the Maria Canals International Music Competition. Through her performing career, teaching, publications and the piano competition that bears her name, Canals made a significant contribution to musical education and piano performance in Catalonia. She received several distinctions during her career, including the Creu de Sant Jordi and appointment as an Officer of the French Ordre des Arts et des Lettres.

== Life and career ==
Maria Canals studied with Joaquim Canals (her father), Lluís Millet (founder of Orfeó Català and the Palau de la Música Catalana) and Ricardo Viñes (Ravel's disciple).

At 15, she started her international career as a concertist collaborating with orchestras and with the most important directors of her time, with a wide repertoire in which the premieres of some works by the most important Catalan composers of the first half of the 20th century stand out, along with a predilection for French music.

In 1950, she and her husband founded the prestigious Acadèmia de Música Ars Nova, and in 1954 she founded the International Music Competition Maria Canals Barcelona (Concurs Internacional d'Execució Musical Maria Canals de Barcelona).

In 1965 the President of the Italian Republic conceded her the "Stella della Solidarità Italiana", and in 1981 the Minister of Culture of the French Republic named her "Chevalier de l'Ordre des Arts des Lettres". In 1990 she was awarded the "Creu de Sant Jordi" by the Generalitat de Catalunya and the Medal for Merit in Fine Arts silver category conceded by the Ministerio de Cultura. In 1994 Barcelona's city hall conceded her the Medal for Artistic Merit gold category.

Maria Canals published the books A life in music (Una vida dins la música, Editorial Selecta) and Forty Years of life of the Musical execution Competition, some memories (Quaranta anys de vida del Concurs d'Execució Musical, alguns records, Publicacions de l'Abadia de Montserrat).

=== From musical beginnings to the first concerts ===
From the first years of her childhood, Maria Remei Canals had been musical. She started her piano studies with her father, Joaquim Canals, who then was a piano teacher in the Municipal Conservatory of Barcelona. When she was 11 years old she enrolled in the Municipal Conservatory of Barcelona and there she continued her studies with her father while she studied solfeo, music theory and composition with Lluís Millet. Later, he also offered her private lessons, from which a relationship of precious spiritual wealth and affect grew.

In April 1932 she debuted professionally with two recitals in the Municipal Conservatory.

During her early years of study, Maria received private instruction from pianist Ricard Viñes, who taught her at his home for two years (1941–1943). These lessons contributed to her technical development and familiarity with French music. During this period, Viñes also introduced her to concert performances, including recitals held in private residences.

After the Spanish Civil War, on May 30, 1942, she attended a concert together with Ricard Viñes in the Palau de la Música Catalana, where she debuted solo in November of the same year.

=== Artistic trajectory and professional contacts ===
Thanks to her career in the world of music and her progress with the technique of the piano, Maria Canals slowly earned recognition from great composers and performers who saw her as an excellent performer for their works. She also had a close friendship with Manuel Blancafort, a friend of the family since 1933.

Blancafort introduced her in the musical environments of Barcelona and presented her to the composers Frederic Mompou and Xavier Montsalvatge, among other personalities from the world of culture and music. It was precisely Blancafort who proposed to the renowned pianist Ricard Viñes that he could give her piano lessons. From Blancafort, Maria Canals premiered many works, such as the Iberian Concert on March 3, 1950, and Nocturn nº 2 on November 9, 1947, among others.

Throughout her long career as a pianist we observe her predilection to interpret music of the moment and of the country; Thus, she premiered works by Xavier Montsalvatge, Frederic Mompou, or her own husband, Rossend Llates. Maria Canals, then, became a pianist who promoted both the premiere and the interpretation of contemporary work.

"Blancafort used to come every week once. He brought me the pieces of music that he had been able to compose in the last few days and I executed the ones he brought me the previous week. [...] I noticed that in Blancafort although he was not a pianist, he gave me some advice that I highly appreciated and agreed with the way of playing of the great pianists [...] ", (UVDLM, p. 99-100).

=== From concerts at home to international tours ===
Maria Canals began her career as a pianist in the 1940s, just after the Civil War. Her career appearances ranged across the main European capitals: in addition to Madrid, also in France, Italy, Switzerland and Germany, but without forgetting the numerous appearances in the Palau de la Música after her first solo concert on November 10 of 1942. That first program included a series of works for which the main composers of the moment complimented the pianist. And since then, at Palau, Canals has offered recitals that included premieres, until the sixties, when the performer gave way to a fuller dedication to her own contest and to pedagogy.

Maria Canals promoted in the majority of her concerts, the work of the Spanish authors Granados, Falla, Turina, Blancafort and Mompou, which is the reason why she became one of the main ambassadors of piano music from Catalonia, and Spain.

"I have never put my personality into the interpretation, I have tried to understand what the composer wanted to say and convey it." Interview Diari Avui.

=== Ars Nova Academy. ===
In 1948, with the help of her fiancée and shortly thereafter husband and musical critic, writer and composer Rossend Llates, she created the Ars Nova Academy. For a long time, the number of students who went to their particular address was increasingly difficult to conceive and thought that the best way to offer good education would be to open a music academy. Initially, the academy began to work in the same private home, but two years later it moved to a new attic in the Rambla de Catalunya, becoming a prestigious training centre. According to what Maria Canals explains in her book Una vida dins la música:

"We were very enthusiastic about Ars Nova and my mother and Rossend both stood firm to create a school with equivalent education to the best conservatories," (UVDLM, p. 214-215).

=== The Ars Nova Academy. Broadcasting activities and prestigious students ===
From the beginning, the academy not only wanted to offer excellence in its classes but also considered it important to organize recitals of the students in different spaces, such as in the Sala Lluís Millet of the Palau de la Música, at the Municipal Library or the French Institute of Barcelona. For Maria Canals, it was very important to train the students to play in front of the public so that they could gain security.

In addition to recitals, the academy also offered conferences and music courses with widely respected speakers, as well as the creation of prizes to spur the interpretive quality of the students. As a result of this intense musical activity, some outstanding disciples began to emerge, including: Maria Neus Miró, Maria Roma, Pere Carboné, Núria Escofet and Leonora Milà, whom was a surprising case of precociousness, as she debuted with only seven years at the Palau de la Música on January 6, 1950, and became a predilect student of Maria Canals; and in 1966, with 24 years, she won the first prize of the Maria Canals International Competition.

In addition to the activities of the academy, Maria Canals created an International Music Course in Sitges with the support of a board of trustees and the organization in charge of the Sitges City Council and Conciertos Aster. The course was carried out between the years 1960 and 1963, with the objective of bringing in good young executants from different countries and different schools.

== Works ==
- A life in music, stories in pink and black (Barcelona: Editorial Selecta, 1970)
- Le Fou de Bor i cavitats de l'Alta Vall del Segre (colab. Carles Ribera i Ramón Viñas; Barcelona: Montblanc, 1970)
- Forty years of the Musical Execution Contest, some memories (presentation by Joan Rigol i Roig, Barcelona: Abadia de Montserrat, 1998)

== Awards ==
- 1965: Order of the Star of Italian Solidarity, conceded by the President of the Italian Republic
- 1979: Diploma of the Generalitat de Catalunya and the Molt Honorable president Josep Tarradellas in acknowledgement of her task in Catalan musical culture.
- 1981: Ordre des Arts et des Lettres awarded by the Minister of Culture and Communication of the French Republic.
- 1990: Creu de Sant Jordi awarded by the Generalitat de Catalunya.
- 1990: Gold Medal of Merit in the Fine Arts silver category awarded by the Ministry of Culture.
- 1994: Gold medal for artistic merit awarded by the City Council of Barcelona.

== The International Music Competition Maria Canals ==
In 1954 the great dream of Maria Canals came to light, a piano contest organized by the same Academy Ars Nova, the Maria Canals International Music Competition. The idea of the contest began to take shape at the academy, but it was not until 1953 that it began to take shape. It was an advanced concern since, in fact, there was no such initiative in Spain.

The competition would have the main venue of the Concert Hall of the Palau de la Música and at the same time, and from the beginning, an international character. In 1958 the Contest entered into the World Federation of International Music Contests, which promoted internationalization and consolidation, achieving great international prestige.

The founding board, along with the civil entities that have been supporting it, has also been increasing over the years, which has allowed the activity of the Competition, not for profit, to be consolidated as a worldwide benchmark for piano interpretation contests.

Among the main objectives, there is currently the incentive for young performers to develop their career as piano professionals and, at the same time, bring closer music and also the same piano as an instrument to society and do so in unconventional areas and spaces. This objective is part of the activities called Off Contest, which includes a set of activities in which music and the instrument are presented in parallel to the Contest, which also promotes knowledge and dissemination at the state level of a competition that from the beginning is one of the main world references.
