= Robert P. Smith (philanthropist) =

American philanthropist (1940–2019)

- Born: February 18, 1940; Boston, Massachusetts, U.S.
- Died: January 7, 2019 (aged 78); Boston, Massachusetts, U.S.
- Occupations: Investment manager, financial pioneer
- Known for: Investing in developing world sovereign debt
- Spouse: Salwa Smith
- Children: 2

Robert Peter (Bob) Smith (February 18, 1940 – January 7, 2019) was an American financial pioneer, philanthropist and author.

== Early life ==
Robert P. Smith (also known as Bob Smith) was born on February 18, 1940, in Boston. Smith grew up in Brookline, Massachusetts as one of two children in his family, with his father practicing law.

== Education ==
Smith attended Bowdoin College and received his undergraduate degree, going on to receive his law degree from Boston University.

== Career ==
In 1978, Smith became the founder and managing director of Turan Corporation. His company went on to become one of the largest privately held sovereign debt trading firms in the world. Peter Marber, the author of From Third World to World Class: The Future of Emerging Markets in the Global Economy (Marber 1998), credits Smith as one of four individuals who contributed "significantly to the birth of the debt market, and possibly even the entire emerging markets investment community, well ahead of Wall Street's more prominent houses."

Smith was the author of Riches Among the Ruins: Adventures in the Dark Corners of the Global Economy, which details his more than 30 years' experience in emerging markets. Riches Among the Ruins chronicles Smith's time spent buying and selling high-risk securities in some of the most downtrodden economies in Latin America, Africa, Russia, Asia, and the Middle East.

With his wealth, Smith served as a benefactor to the David Saul Smith Union at Bowdoin College and the Robert P. Smith Art Center and Theater at the Roxbury Latin School. He also served as a trustee for organizations including Plimoth Plantation and the Fessenden School.

He joined the United States Agency for International Development during the Vietnam War, working for the US Government in Saigon as well as the Dominican Republic.

== Public Profile ==
Robert Lenzner, writing for Forbes Magazine, compared Smith to Indiana Jones:

"If Robert P. Smith didn't exist, Eric Ambler would have to invent him. One night in the early 1980s, an explosion shook the Sheraton in San Salvador. Awakened in his room five floors up, Smith was amazed at his good fortune-not simply that he was unhurt, but that the violence would keep his competitors out of El Salvador for a while"

Robert Smith was an authority on developing world debt and was cited or quoted in numerous publications including The Providence Journal, The Wall Street Journal, The Financial Times and various publications of Euromoney Publications of London.

== Death ==
Robert Smith died by natural causes on January 7, 2019, at 78 years old. He is survived by his wife, Salwa, two children and two grandchildren who reside in Boston and New York City.
