= Trần Văn Khê =

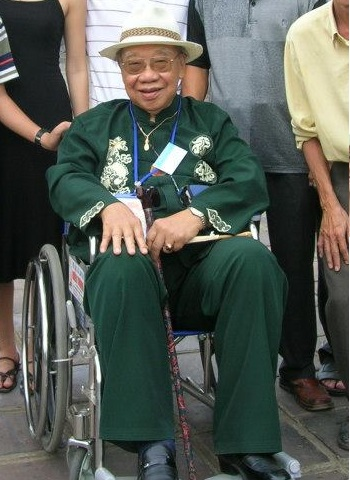
Trần Văn Khê

Trần Văn Khê (24 July 1921 – 24 June 2015) was a Vietnamese musicologist, academic, writer, teacher and performer of traditional music. He was father of the musician ethnomusicologist Trần Quang Hải. His La musique viêtnamienne traditionnelle (Paris, 1962) was for many years a standard text of Vietnamese musicology.

He was director of research at CNRS and professor at the Sorbonne. In 2008 he was named Honorary Member of the International Music Council of UNESCO, where he coordinated the project "The Universe of Music, A History".
