= Turan, Russia =

Turan (Russian: Туран or Турань) is the name of several inhabited localities in Russia:

- Turan, Tuva Republic, a town in Piy-Khemsky District
- Turan, Republic of Buryatia, a selo in Tunkinsky District
- Turan, Nizhny Novgorod Oblast, a selo in Vetluzhsky District
- Turan Urban Settlement, a municipal division of Turan Town Under District Jurisdiction in Piy-Khemsky District
