= Touran =

Touran may refer to:

== People ==
- Dana Touran (born 1993), Jordanian taekwondo practitioner
- Touran Mirhadi (1927–2016), Iranian educator, researcher, and author

== Other uses ==
- Touran Wildlife Refuge, a national park in Semnan, Iran
- Volkswagen Touran, a 2003–present German compact MPV
