= Turan Corporation =

American investment firm

- Type: Private company
- Industry: Emerging market debt
- Founded: 1978; 48 years ago
- Headquarters: Boston, United States
- Key people: Robert P. Smith (Managing Director)
- Products: Investments in emerging market debt
- Website: www.turancorp.com

Turan Corporation is an American investment firm that was founded as Turam ("Turkish-American") Corporation by Robert P. Smith in 1978, and soon became one of the largest privately held sovereign debt trading firms in the world. According to Smith, after a dispute with the original partners, Smith sold his interest to another party and reformed as Turan Corporation, in effect "selling the M".

It was notable for being the first Western company to invest in Turkish sovereign debt, setting the investment strategy the company would follow later on in Argentina, Nigeria, and El Salvador.

== History ==
Peter Marber, the author of From Third World to World Class: The Future of Emerging Markets in the Global Economy (Marber 1998), credits Smith as one of four individuals who contributed "significantly to the birth of the debt market, and possibly even the entire emerging markets investment community, well ahead of Wall Street's more prominent houses." The other individuals cited by Marber in this context are Giacomo DeFillippis of Giadefi, J. Player Crosby: of Finamex: and Martin Schubert of Eurinam.

In pioneering the trade in emerging market debt, Turan became involved with a number of risky assets, including Iraq, Ecuadorian and even Soviet-era Russian debt More recently, they profited from the Dubai World 2009 debt standstill by investing in Nakheel bonds that were in severe danger of default.

Turan Corporation are one of the major private, non-governmental parties who did not accept the results of the Argentine debt restructuring and remain in litigation to recover funds from the Argentine government.
