= Anna-Maria Hefele =

German overtone singer

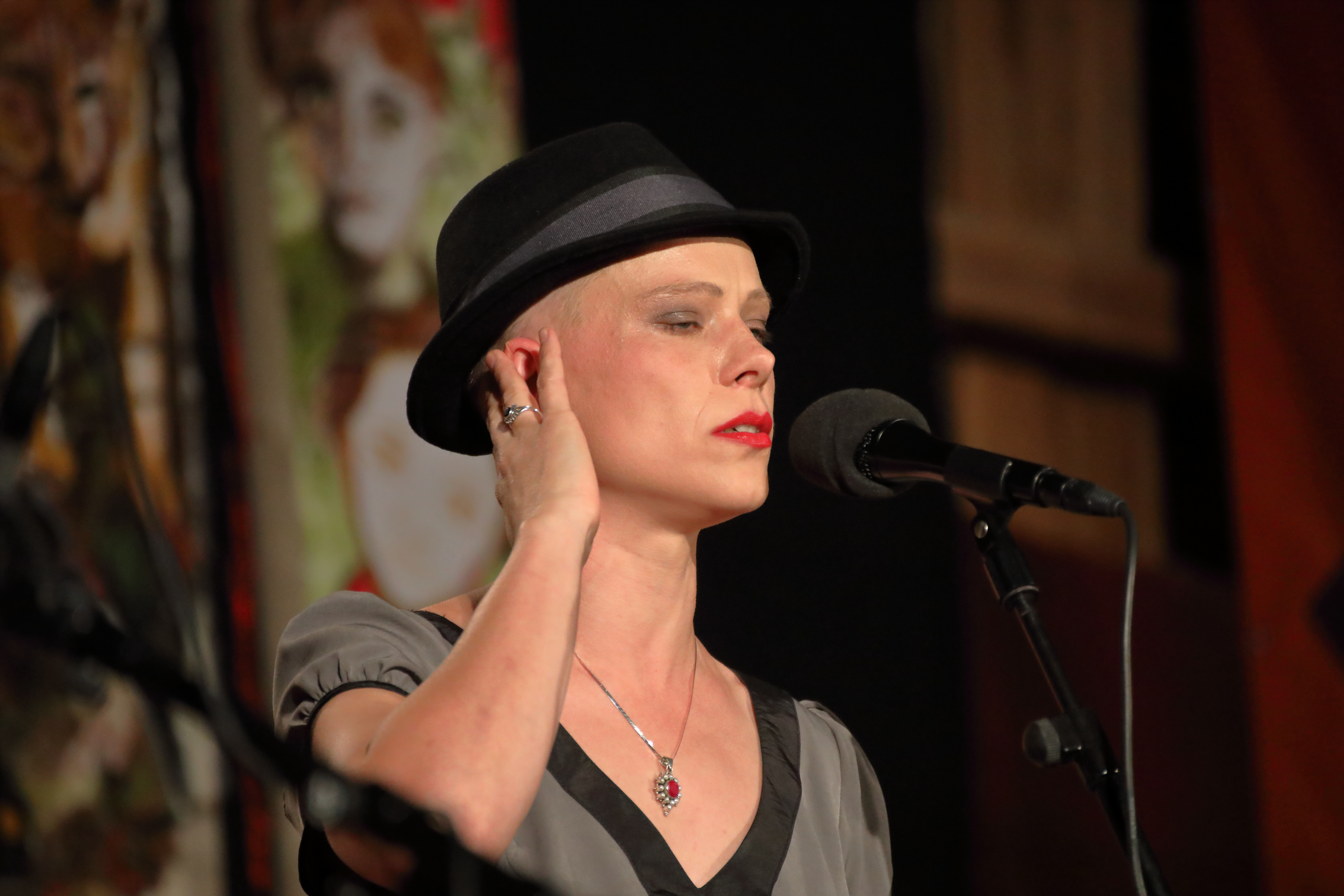
Anna-Maria Hefele at INNtöne Jazzfestival in 2019

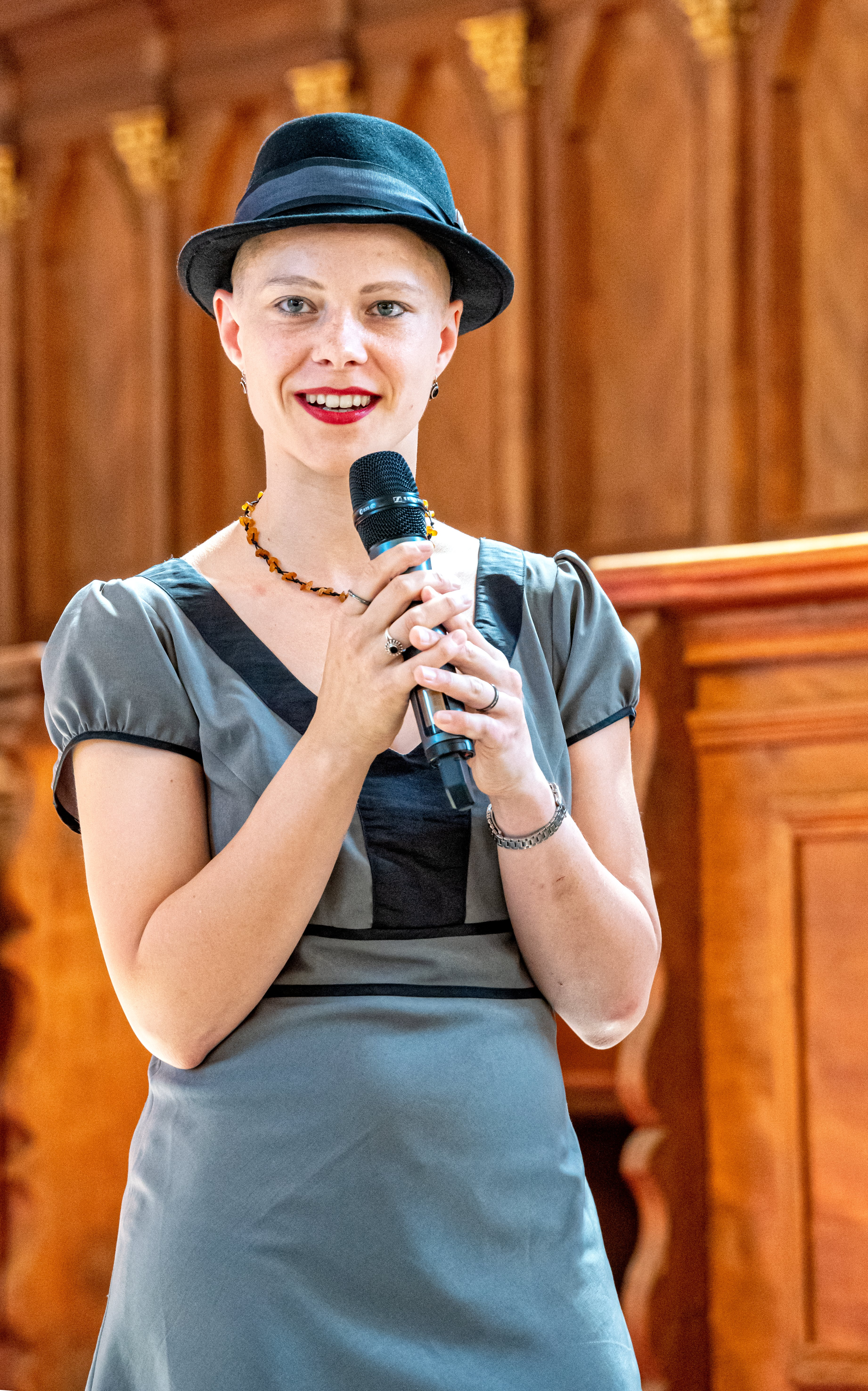
Anna-Maria Hefele at Black Forest Voices Festival in 2019

Anna-Maria Hefele is a German overtone singer. Hefele is from Grafing near Munich.

This technique of singing polyphonic overtones is also known as "throat singing," and Hefele has been practicing it since 2005.

There are several styles of overtone singing found around the world. Canadian Inuit and several forms displayed in Mongolia and surrounding regions are the most recognized. Hefele's style is culturally practiced in the Siberian region of Tuva. This whistling vocal version is called sygyt.

The Huffington Post has commented on her "amazing ability" and her singing being "utterly bizarre". On 10 October 2014, she was number two on The Guardian's Viral Video Chart, with one online video titled Polyphonic Overtone Singing, which features Hefele as she demonstrates and explains overtones. As of June 2021, this video has received more than 21 million hits.
