= Trần Quang Hải =

Vietnamese ethnomusicologist

- Born: 13 May 1944; Gia Định, French Indochina
- Died: 28 December 2021 (aged 77); Limeil-Brévannes, France
- Occupation: Ethnomusicologist
- Parent: Trần Văn Khê (father)

Trần Quang Hải (13 May 1944 – 28 December 2021) was a Vietnamese ethnomusicologist. He was a recipient of the Legion of Honour (2002).

Hải died on 28 December 2021 of blood cancer in Limeil-Brévannes, at the age of 77.
