= Óscar Esplá =

Spanish composer

The Most Excellent Óscar Esplá
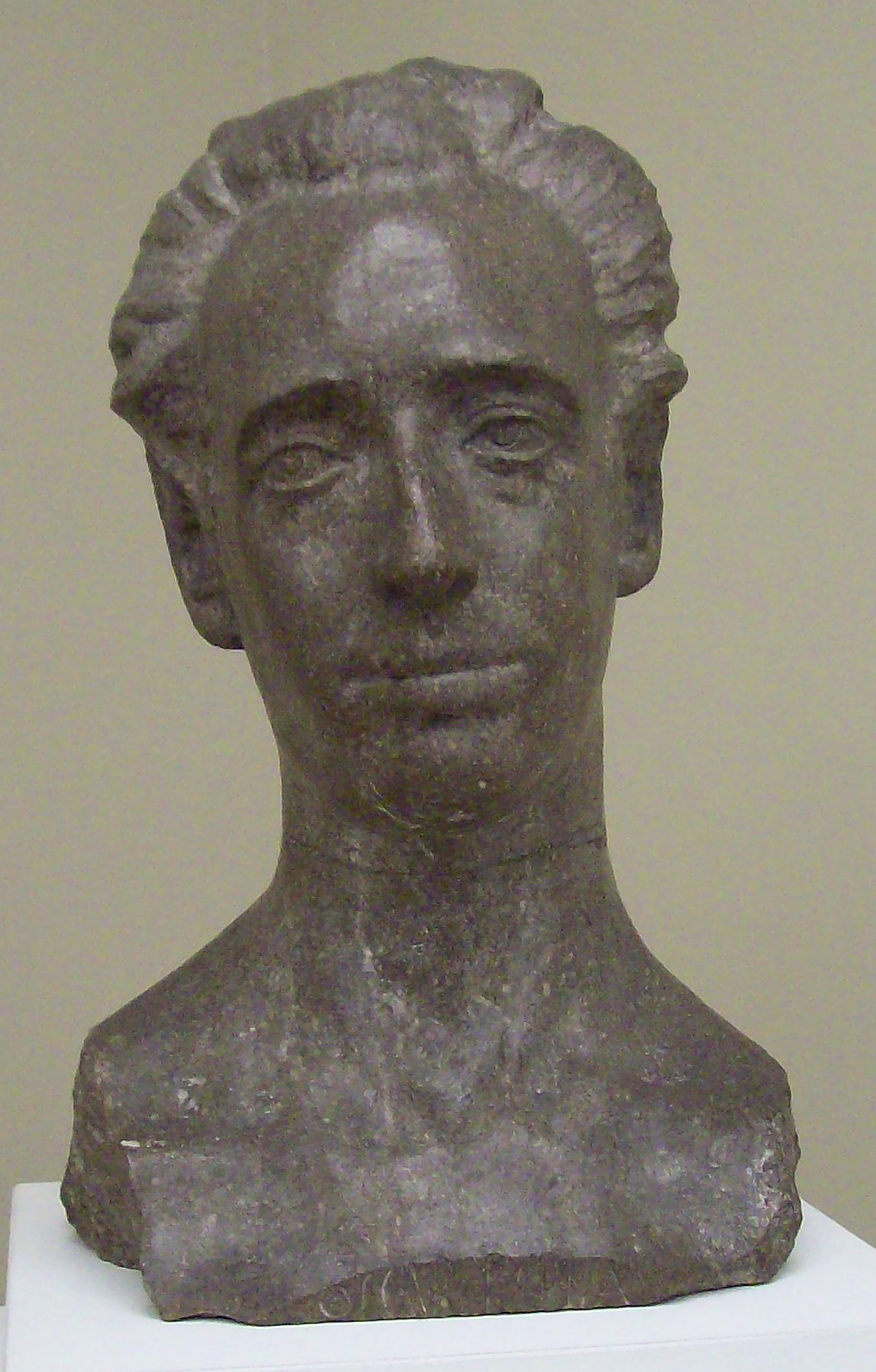
- Bust by Vicente Bañuls, 1923
- Born: Óscar Esplá y Triay; 5 August 1886; Alicante, Spain
- Died: 6 January 1976 (aged 89); Madrid, Spain
- Occupation: composer

Signature
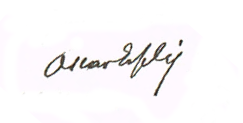

Óscar Esplá y Triay (5 August 1886 (Note: The date of his birth is in question, and is sometimes given as 1889; there is no birth certificate.) – 6 January 1976) was a Spanish composer. The Conservatorio Superior de Música (conservatory) of the city of Alicante is dedicated to him. The Premio internacional de composición Óscar Esplá (Óscar Esplá international prize for composition) was created in 1955 and is awarded by the city of Alicante.

== Life ==
Óscar Esplá was born on 5 August 1886 in Alicante, in the Kingdom of Spain. His early musical studies were with his father, Trino Esplá, and with Fernando Lloret and Juan Latorre Baeza. In 1903 he went to Barcelona to study industrial engineering, but later changed to study philosophy. He studied composition with Francisco Sánchez Gavagnac. In 1911, after winning an international prize, he went to Austria and Germany; he met Ferdinand Löwe in Vienna, and Max Reger in Meiningen. In 1912–13 he was in Paris; he met Saint-Saëns, but there is no evidence that he studied with him.

In 1936 Esplá was appointed director of the Conservatorio Nacional de Música y Declamación in Madrid, but did not take up the position. Instead, because of the Spanish Civil War, he left Spain and went with his family to Belgium, where he worked for Le Soir, which at that time was under Nazi control. He was not permitted to return to Spain until 1950. With Roberto Gerhard, Frederic Mompou and Adolfo Salazar, he was a part of the Spanish Grupo de los cuatro.

He died in Madrid on 6 January 1976, and was buried in the church of the Monasterio de la Santa Faz in Alicante.

== Honours ==
Esplá was elected to the Académie des Beaux-Arts de Paris on 9 May 1956. In 1959 he received the Grand Cross of the Orden de Alfonso X el Sabio. He was elected an honorary member of the International Society for Contemporary Music in 1965.

== Works ==
- El sueño de Eros (1910), symphonic poem
- Suite levantina (1911)
- La nochebuena del diablo (1923), cantata
- Don Quijote velando las armas (1924), symphonic poem
- Himno republicano (1931), which contributed to the official version of the Himno de Riego under the Second Spanish Republic (1931–1939)
- Tres Canciones (1952)
- Sinfonía Aitana (1964)
- Tres Movimientos para piano
- Sonata Española para piano
- Crespusculum op. 15 para piano
