= Turan, Tuva Republic =

Town in the Tuva Republic, Russia

Turan Туран
- Town

Other transcription(s)
  - Tuvan: Туран
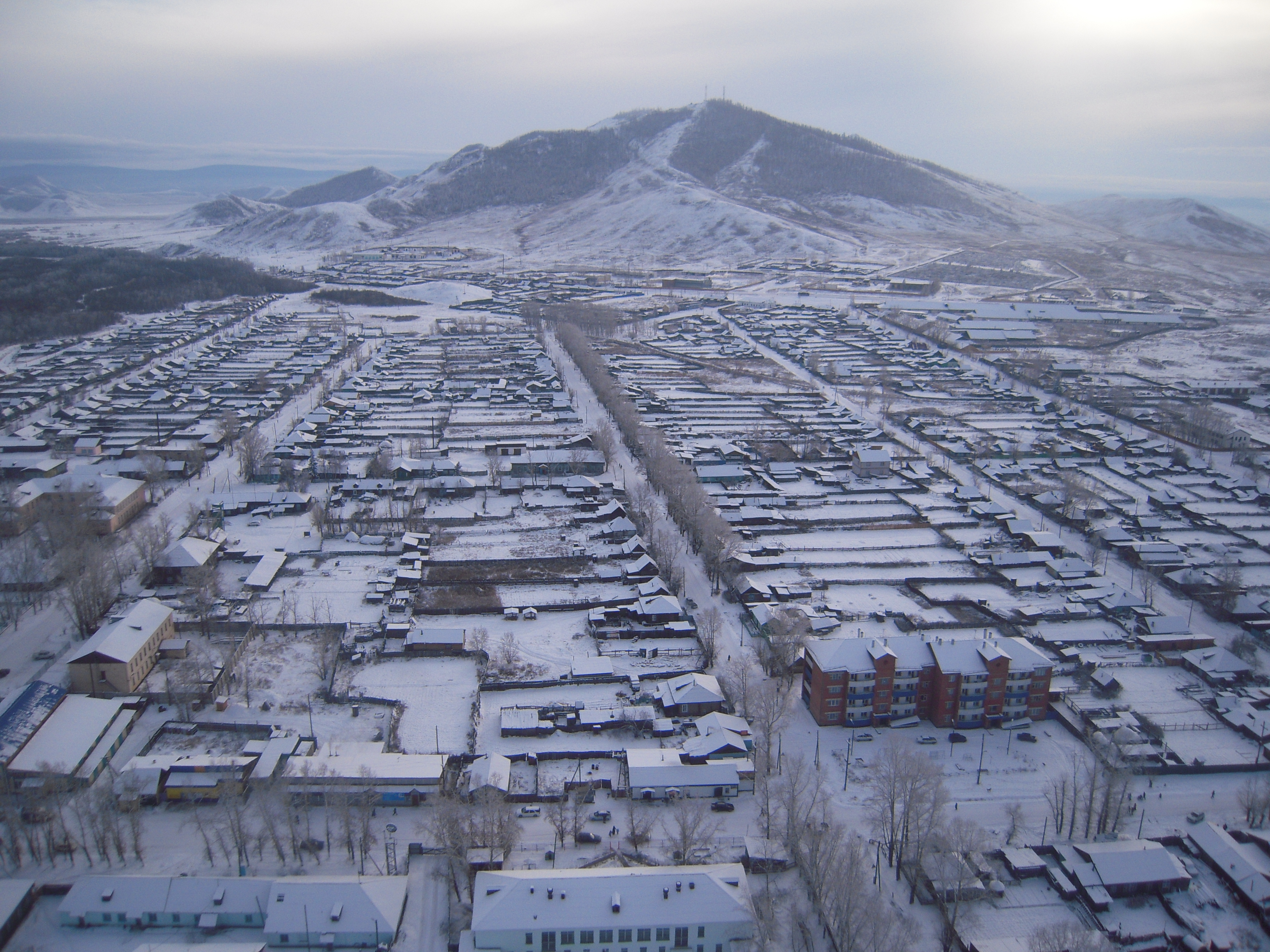
- View of Turan

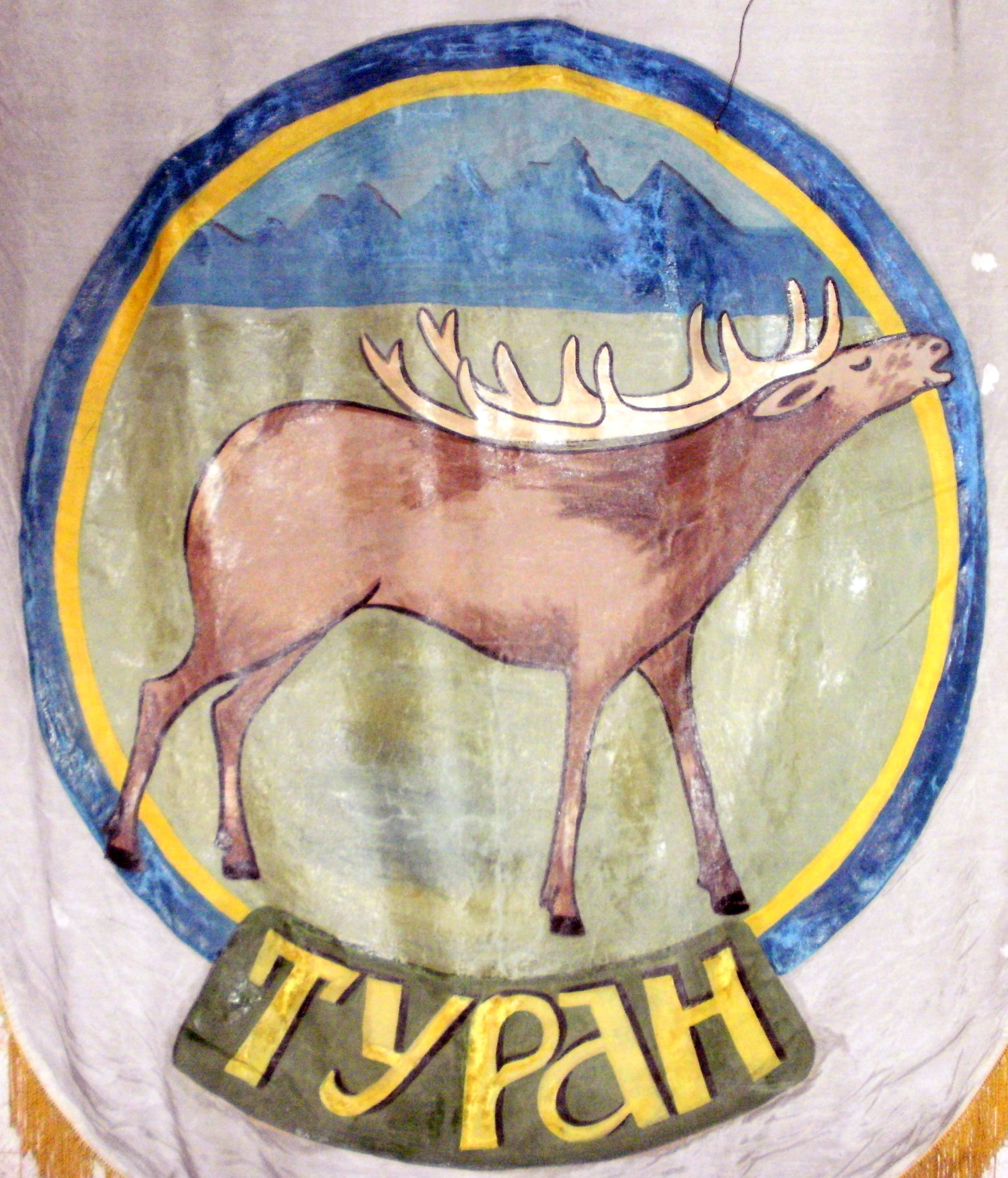
- Flag Coat of arms
- Interactive map of Turan
- Location of Turan Turan (Tuva Republic)
- Coordinates: 52°08′N 93°54′E
- Country: Russia
- Federal subject: Tuva
- Administrative district: Piy-Khemsky District
- Town under district jurisdictionSelsoviet: Turan
- Founded: 1885
- Town status since: 1945
- Elevation: 860 m (2,820 ft)

Population (2010 Census)
  - Total: 4,981
  - Estimate (2021): 5,044 (+1.3%)

Administrative status
  - Capital of: Piy-Khemsky District, Turan Town Under District Jurisdiction

Municipal status
  - Municipal district: Piy-Khemsky Municipal District
  - Urban settlement: Turan Urban Settlement
  - Capital of: Piy-Khemsky Municipal District, Turan Urban Settlement
- Time zone: UTC+7 (MSK+4)
- Postal codes: 668510, 668518
- OKTMO ID: 93635101001

Turan population
- 2010 Census: 4,981
- 2002 Census: 5,598
- 1989 Census: 5,976
- 1979 Census: 5,139

Turan (Russian: Тура́н; Tuvan: Туран) is a town and the administrative center of Piy-Khemsky District in the Tuva Republic, Russia, located 70 kilometers (43 mi) northwest of Kyzyl, the capital of the republic. As of the 2010 Census, its population was 4,981.

== Etymology ==
The name of the town comes from the Turkic word for "saline land."

== History ==
It was founded in 1885 by Russian settlers from Siberia; town status was granted to it in 1945.

== Administrative and municipal status ==
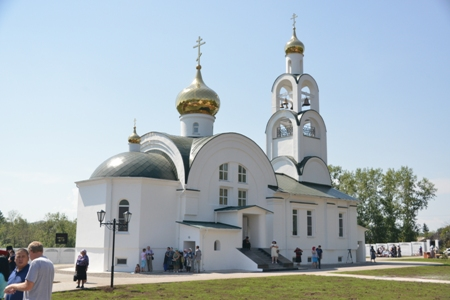
Church of Saint Vladimir

Within the framework of administrative divisions, Turan serves as the administrative center of Piy-Khemsky District. As an administrative division, it is, together with three rural localities, incorporated within Piy-Khemsky District as Turan Town Under District Jurisdiction. As a municipal division, Turan Town Under District Jurisdiction is incorporated within Piy-Khemsky Municipal District as Turan Urban Settlement.

== Transportation ==
There is an airport in the town.
