= Turan Ensemble =

Band from Kazakhstan

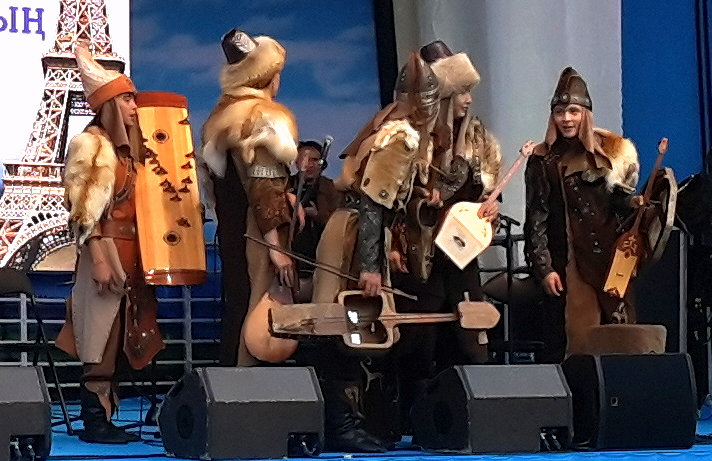
Turan Ensemble in Paris, 1 November 2014

Turan Ensemble (also named Тұран, or Turan Ethno Folk Band) is a Kazakh folk music band, which was created in 2008 by several students of Kazakh National Conservatory named after Kurmangazy.

The Turan ensemble is a band composed of five members: Abzal Arykbaev who is the group's throat singer, Maxat (Maksat) Medeubek, Bauirzhan Bekmukhanbetov, Serik Nurmoldaev, Erzhigit Aliyev.

The band usually play popular folk instruments such as dombra, zhetigen, kobyz, sybyzgy, sherter, shankobyz and some others. In their performances the Turan ensemble often wears traditional Kazakh costume to invoke links to an ancient Turkic past. As artists-in-residence at the Museum of Kazakh Folk Musical Instruments, the Turan ensemble seeks new ways to remodel folk music by using these traditional Kazakh musical instruments.

== Experience ==
Under the auspices of the Kazakh Ministry of Culture, the Turan ensemble has toured Central Asia, Europe and the United States. The ensemble has participated in a number of international events, and has released recordings of their work:

- From 2008 to 2015, Turan ensemble attend a lot of music festivals, and made numerous successful performances all over the world.
- In August 2008, Turan became a member of the international festival "Young Euro Classic" in Berlin, and their performance in Germany received a good response
- In November 2009, the Turan ensemble made a very successful concert tour of the United States, performing in Los Angeles, San Francisco, Washington DC, Boston and New York.
- Spring 2010, the ensemble's first CD Turan was released.
- April 2010, Turan conduct a solo concert in Israel.
- August 2010, Ensemble became a member of the World Grand kurultay "Turan" in Hungary. The world media reported their performance.
- In 2011, Turan ensemble performed in many countries representing Kazakhstan.
- Performance In Bundestkunsthalle (Berlin).
- Attend the opening of the first Kazakh cinema festival "Kazakhstan: a kaleidoscope of pictures" in Los Angeles, USA.
- performance in Hammer Museum, University of California, Los Angeles.
- Award winner at ethnic festival "Sharq Taronalari 2011" in Samarkand, Uzbekistan
- Solo concert in Barcelona, Spain; in Yekaterinburg, Russia; in Stuttgart, Frankfurt, Munich, Düsseldorf (Germany).
- Release the second album "El turan"
- October 2013, performed at the 8-day "IIC Experience" festival in New Delhi, India
- November 2013, Turan ensemble conduct "Величие кюя" concert-lecture in Museum of Kazakh folk musical instruments.
- November 2014, solo concert in an exhibition about Kazakhstan culture, at Place du Palais-Royal, Paris, France, for the opening of direct Paris to Almaty airline (.
- December 2014, made a solo concert called "Ер Тұран" for the independence of Kazakhstan.
- October 2015, Turan attended the World Music Shanghai in China and performed at several places in Beijing and Shanghai.

== Photographs ==
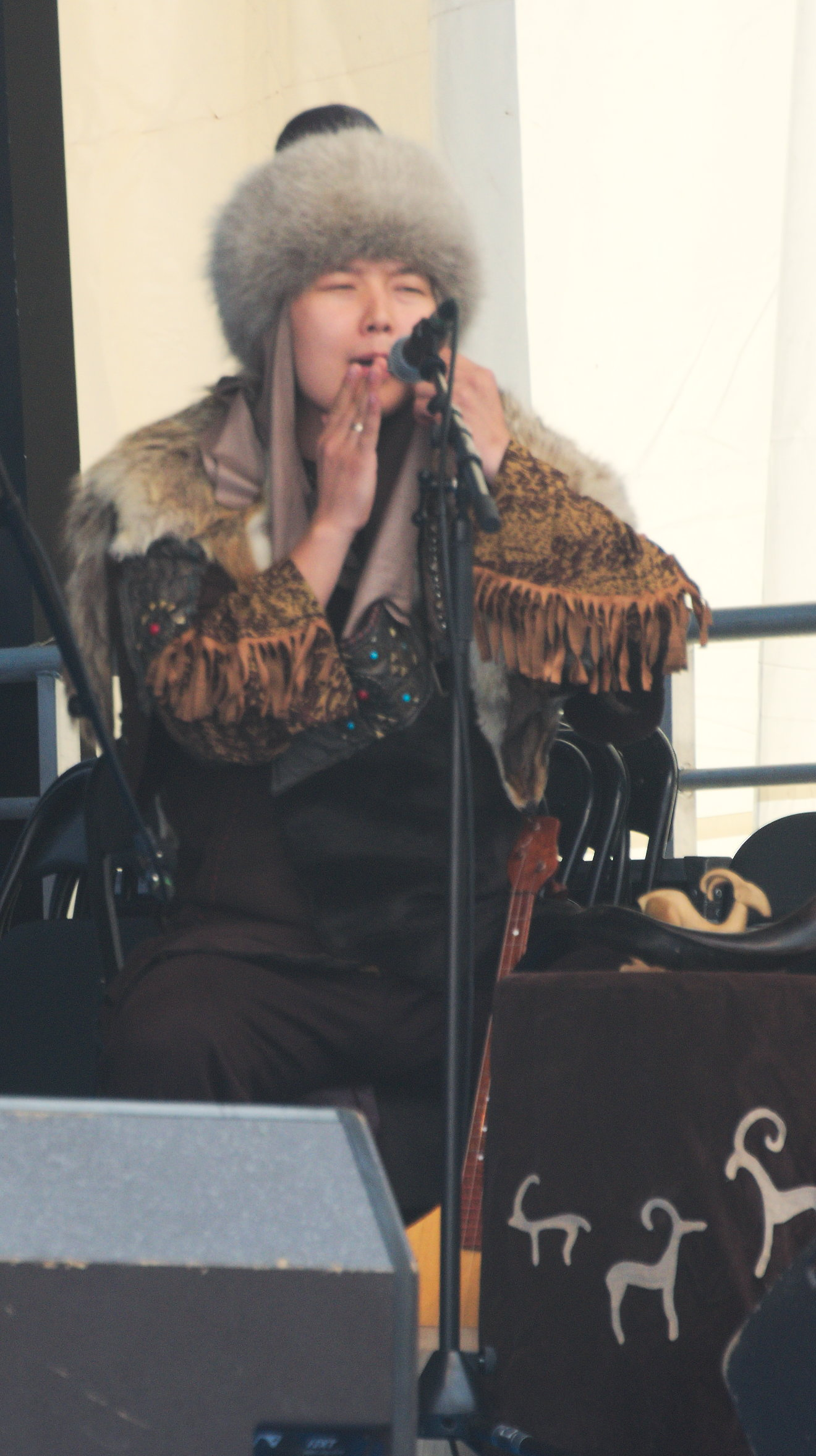
Abzal Arykbaev
shankubyz

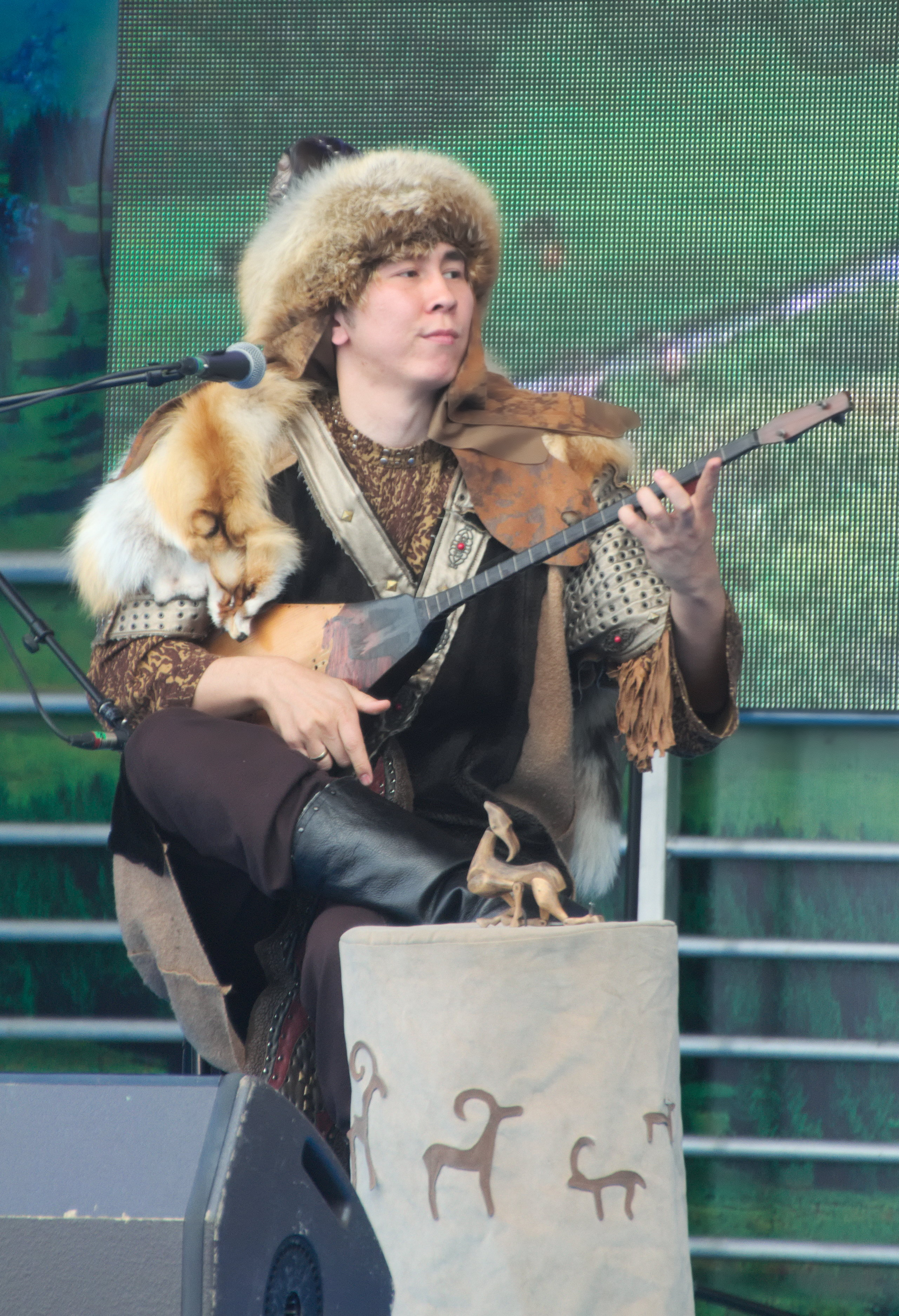
Bauirzhan Bekmukhanbetov
dombra

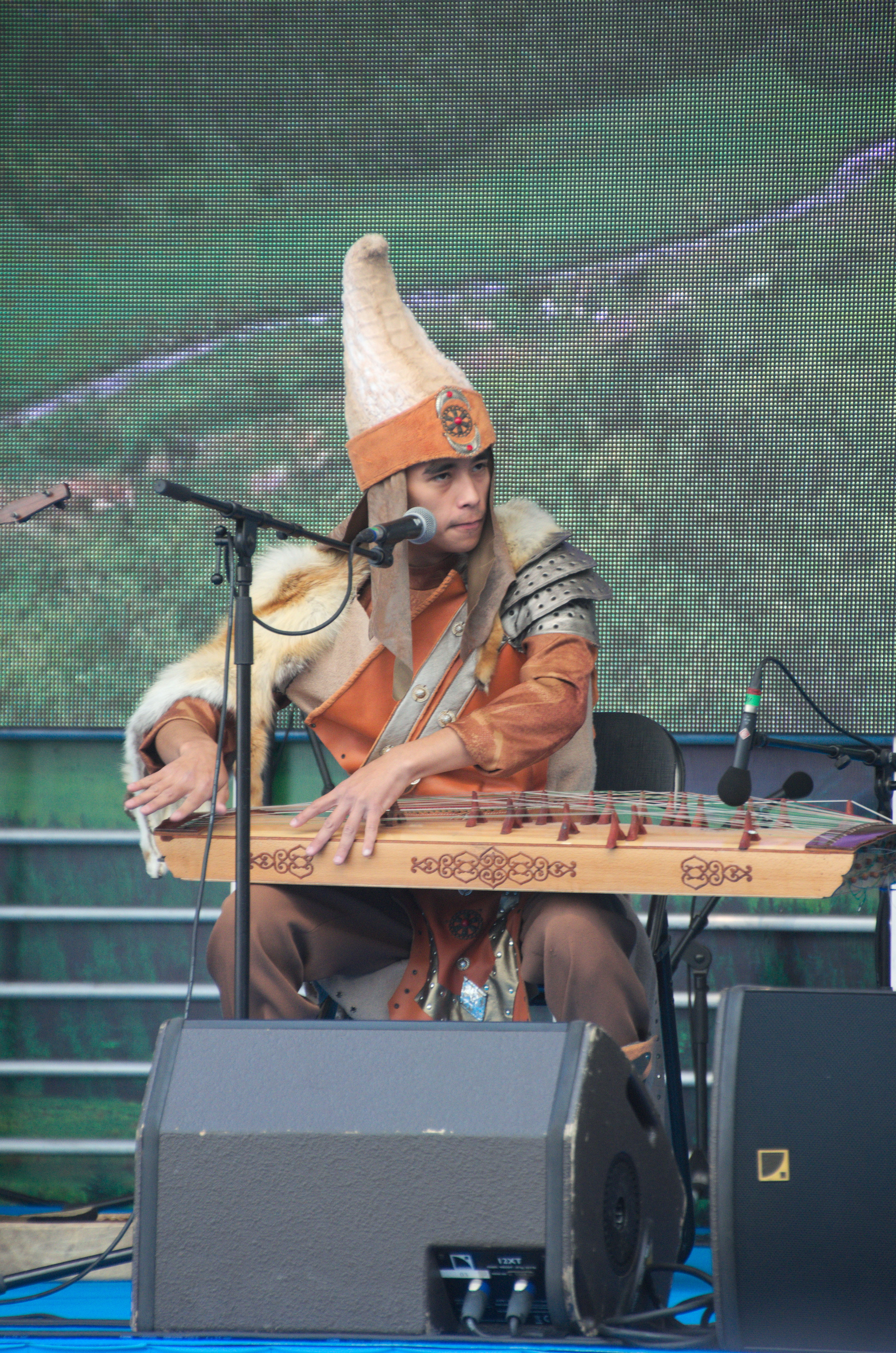
Erzhigit Aliyev
jetigen

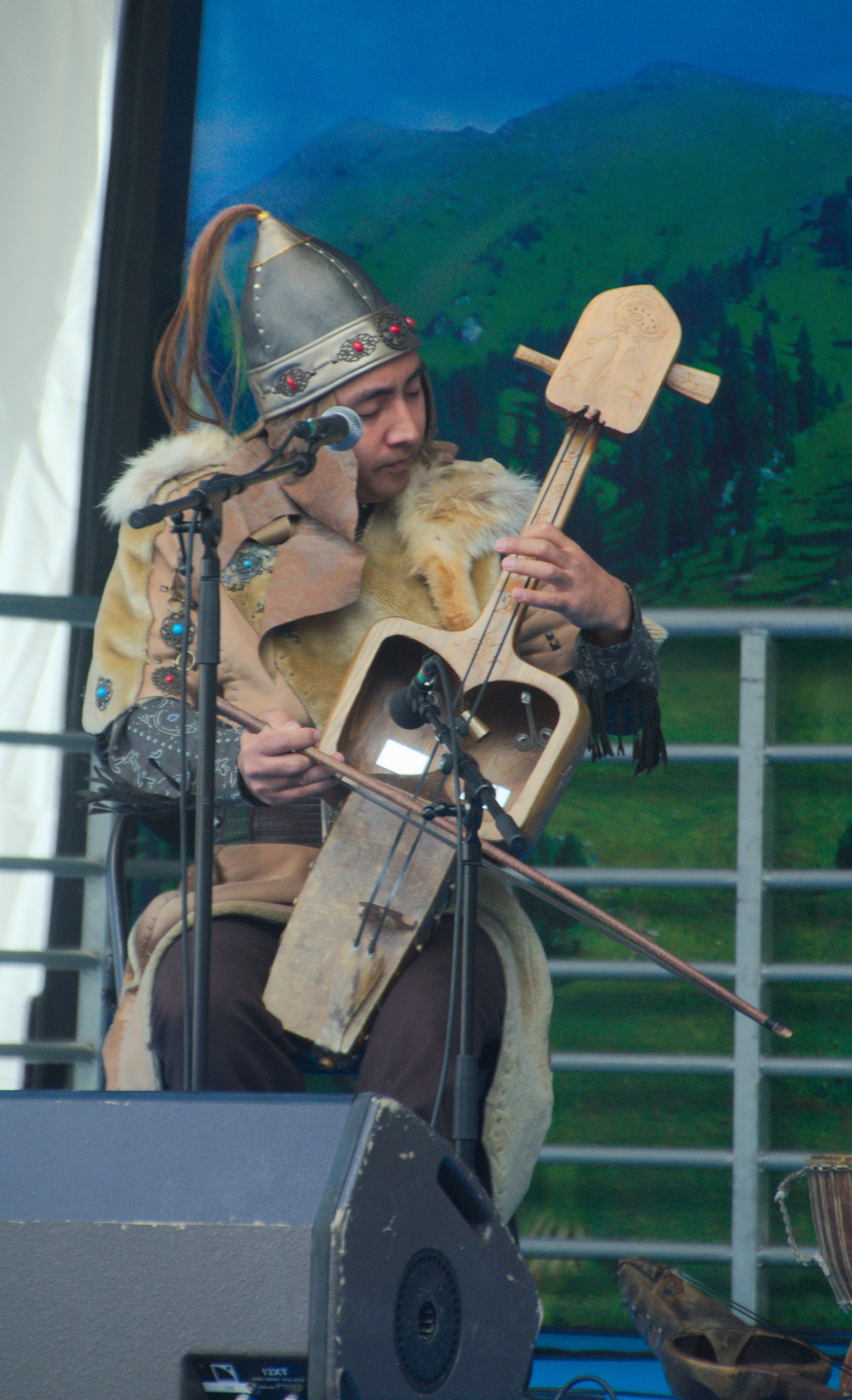
Maxat Medeubek
kobyz

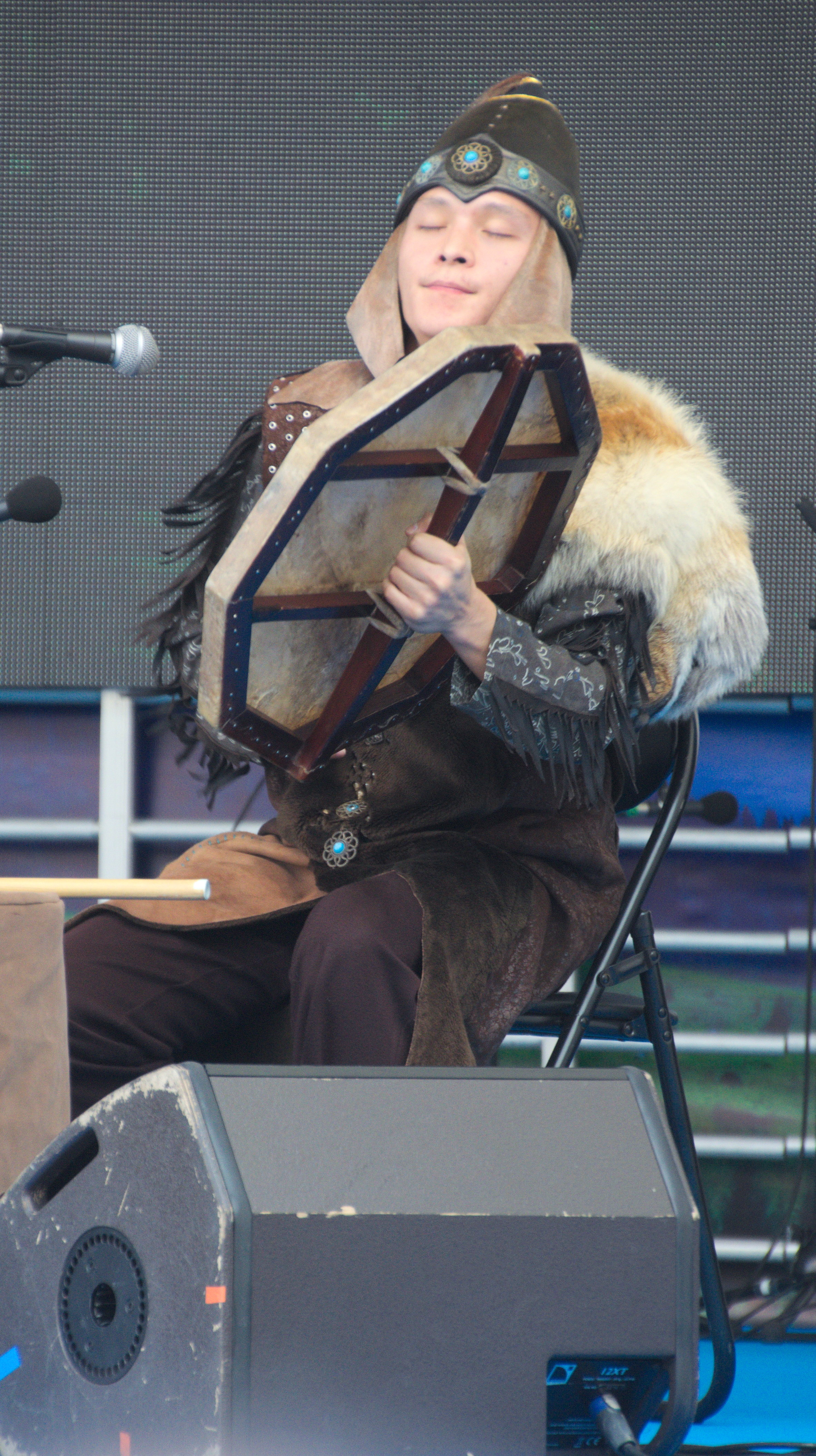
Serik Nurmoldaev
shaman drum

== Classical tracks ==
Their classical tracks include:

- 01-Er Turan【Anshilik – Аңшылық】<Ер Тұран>
- 02-Er Turan【Elim ai – Елім ай】<Ер Тұран>
- 03-Er Turan【Er Turan – Ер Тұран】<Ер Тұран>
- 04-Er Turan【Inspiration – Вдохновение】<Ер Тұран>
- 05-Er Turan【Jarapazan – Жарапазан】
- 06-Er Turan【Kara jorga – Кара жорга】<Ер Тұран>
- 07-Er Turan【Kazajstan – Қазақстан】
- 08-Er Turan【Kazak land – Казак елi】<Тұран>
- 09-Er Turan【Koroglu – Короглы】<Ер Тұран>
- 10-Er Turan【Kossbassar】
- 11-Er Turan【Lullaby – Колыбельная】<Тұран>
- 12-Er Turan【Mothers Hand – Ана алақаны】<Тұран>
- 13-Er Turan【Mukkagali Tolgyi – Мұқағали толғауы】<Ер Тұран>
- 14-Er Turan【Orteke – Ортеке】<Ер Тұран>
- 15-Er Turan【Koroglu – Короглы】<Тұран>
- 16-Er Turan【Secret of feeling – Сезім сыры】<Тұран>
- 17-Er Turan【Shaman】
- 18-Er Turan【Swan – Аққу】<Ер Тұран>
- 19-Er Turan【Tolgau – Толгау】<Тұран>
- 20-Er Turan【Toy duman – Тоң думан】<Тұран>
- 21-Er Turan【Zharapazan】
- 22-Uly Turan Mangilik 【Uly Turan Mangilik – Ұлы Тұран – Мәңгілік】<Тұран>
- 23-Uly Turan Mangilik 【Eagle – Бүркіт】<Тұран>
- 24-Uly Turan Mangilik 【Difficult time – Қилы заман】<Тұран>
- 25-Uly Turan Mangilik 【Syrlasu – Сырласу】<Тұран>
- 26-Uly Turan Mangilik 【Ansa janym – Аңса жаным】<Тұран>
- 27-Uly Turan Mangilik 【Lame Kulan – Ақсақ құлан】 <Тұран>
- 28-Uly Turan Mangilik 【Caravan – Керуен】 <Тұран>
- 29-Uly Turan Mangilik 【Zheldirme – Желдірме】 <Тұран>
- 30-Uly Turan Mangilik 【Balbobek – Балбөбек】 <Тұран>
- 31-Uly Turan Mangilik 【Kara jorga – Кара жорга】 <Тұран>
