= Turina =

Turina is a surname. Notable people with the surname include: Turina is an Italian surname https://www.mappadeicognomi.it/index.php?sur=TURINA&s=Genera

- Delia Turina (1936–2001), Egyptian-Spanish oriental dancer
- Ivan Turina (1980–2013), Croatian footballer
- Joaquín Turina (1882–1949), Spanish classical composer
- José Luis Turina (born 1952), Spanish composer
- Luciana Turina (born 1946), Italian singer, actress and television personality
- Marko Turina (born 1937), Croatian cardiac surgeon
- Alberto Turina (born in Verona in 1967), Italian designer and artist
