= Makarov (surname) =

Makarov/Makarova (masculine/feminine) (Russian: Макаров/Макарова) is a Russian patronymic surname that is derived from the male given name Makar (in turn derived from the Greek name Macarius) and literally means Makar's. The surname may also be transcribed as Makaroff or Makarow. Notable people with the surname include:

- Aleksandr Makarov (javelin thrower) (born 1951), javelin thrower
- Aleksandr Makarov (goalkeeper) (born 1978), Russian football goalkeeper
- Aleksandr Makarov (winger) (born 1978), Russian football winger
- Aleksandr M. Makarov (1906–1999), director of Ukrainian rocket factory Yuzhmash
- Aleksandr Makarov (footballer, born 1996), Russian football midfielder
- Aleksandr Aleksandrovich Makarov (1857–1919), Imperial Russian politician
- Aleksandr Makarov (physicist) (born 1966), Russian inventor in the field of mass spectrometry
- Aleksandr Sergeyevich Makarov (born 1946), mayor of the city of Tomsk, Russia
- Alexander Makarov (ice hockey, born 1962), Russian ice hockey player
- Alexander Makarov (ice hockey, born 1989), Russian ice hockey player
- Alexei Makarov, Russian statesman
- Alexandra Makarova, Slovak filmmaker
- Andrei Makarov (ice hockey, born 1964), Russian ice hockey forward who played with Ak Bars Kazan
- Andrei Makarov (ice hockey, born 1966), Russian ice hockey forward who played with Metallurg Novokuznetsk
- Andrey Makarov (ice hockey) (born 1993), Russian ice hockey goaltender
- Andrey Makarov (racewalker) (born 1971), Belarusian race walker
- Andrey Makarov (politician), Russian lawyer and politician
- Andrey Makarov (weightlifter), Kazakhstani weightlifter
- Anna Makarova, Ukrainian and Russian volleyball player
- Antonina Makarova, Soviet executioner and Nazi collaborator
- Ekaterina Makarova, Russian tennis player
- Elena Makarova, Russian tennis player
- Igor Makarov (footballer, born 1961), Russian footballer
- Igor Makarov (businessman) (born 1962), Turkmeni-born Cypriot entrepreneur, philanthropist and former cyclist
- Igor Makarov (footballer, born 1970), Russian footballer
- Igor Makarov (ice hockey) (born 1987), Russian professional ice hockey player
- Igor Makarov, Russian name of Ihar Makarau (born 1979), Belarusian judoka
- Igor Makarov, Russian name of Ihar Makaraw (born 1985), Belarusian footballer
- Ivan Makarov, Russian painter
- Kira Makarova, Estonian-American biologist
- Konstantin Makarov, Soviet Navy admiral
- Konstantin Makarov (ice hockey)
- Ksenia Makarova, Russian-American figure skater
- Natalia Makarova, Russian-American ballerina
- Nikolay Makarov (firearms designer) (1914–1988), Soviet firearms designer
- Nikolai Georgievich Makarov (born 1955), Russian mathematician
- Nikolay Mikhaylovich Makarov (born 1948), Soviet ice hockey player
- Nikolay Makarov (general) (born 1949), Russian general and Chief of the General Staff
- Oleh Makarov (footballer) (1929–1995), Soviet footballer
- Oleh Makarov (politician), Ukrainian lawyer and politician
- Oleg Makarov (cosmonaut) (1933–2003), Russian cosmonaut
- Oleg Makarov (figure skater) (born 1962), Soviet figure skater
- Sergei Makarov (ice hockey), Russian ice hockey player
- Sergey Makarov (athlete), Russian javelin thrower
- Stepan Makarov, Russian admiral
- Tamara Makarova, Soviet actress
- Tatyana Makarova, Soviet World War II pilot
- Vladimir Makarov (1947–1979), Soviet footballer
- Vyacheslav Makarov, Russian politician
- Michail Makarow, German bobsledder

== Fictional characters ==
- Vladimir Makarov, the primary antagonist in the video game Call of Duty: Modern Warfare 3
