= Shoigu (name) =

Shoigu, also spelled Shoygu (Russian: Шойгу), is a Tuvan given name and surname. Notable people with the surname include:

- Larisa Shoigu (1953–2021), Russian politician
- Sergei Shoigu (born 1955), Russian politician and military officer
- Yulia Shoigu (born 1977), Russian politician

All three individuals listed are descendants of Kuzhuget Shoigu (né Shoigu Kuzhuget), whose first name and surname were transposed on official forms due to a Soviet government-ordered name change.
