= Aleksandr Makarov =

Aleksandr or Alexander Makarov may refer to:

- Aleksandr Makarov (javelin thrower) (born 1951), javelin thrower
- Aleksandr Makarov (goalkeeper) (born 1978), Russian football goalkeeper
- Aleksandr Makarov (winger) (born 1978), Russian football winger
- Aleksandr M. Makarov (1906–1999), director of Ukrainian rocket factory Yuzhmash
- Aleksandr Makarov (footballer, born 1996), Russian football midfielder
- Aleksandr Aleksandrovich Makarov (1857–1919), Imperial Russian politician
- Aleksandr Makarov (physicist) (born 1966), Russian inventor in the field of mass spectrometry
- Aleksandr Sergeyevich Makarov (born 1946), mayor of the city of Tomsk, Russia
- Alexander Makarov (ice hockey, born 1962), Russian ice hockey player
- Alexander Makarov (ice hockey, born 1989), Russian ice hockey player
