= Andrei Makarov =

Andrei Makarov or Andrey Makarov may refer to:

- Andrei Makarov (ice hockey, born 1964), Russian ice hockey forward who played with Ak Bars Kazan
- Andrei Makarov (ice hockey, born 1966), Russian ice hockey forward who played with Metallurg Novokuznetsk
- Andrey Makarov (ice hockey) (born 1993), Russian ice hockey goaltender
- Andrey Makarov (racewalker) (born 1971), Belarusian race walker
- Andrey Makarov (politician) (born 1954), Russian lawyer and politician
- Andrey Makarov (weightlifter) (born 1972), Kazakhstani weightlifter

== See also ==
- Makarov (surname)
