= Lev Panin =

Lev Yevgenievich Panin (Russian: Лев Евгеньевич Панин; 1935–2013) was a Soviet and Russian scientist, doctor of medicine sciences, corresponding member of RAMS (1986), professor, academician of RAMS (1993) and RAS (2013).

== Biography ==
Panin was born on November 15, 1935, in Tobolsk. In 1960 he graduated from the Tomsk Medical Institute. Until 1963, he was a post-graduate student at the department of biochemistry of this educational establishment, then a post-graduate student in the Leningrad Sanitary and Hygienic Medical Institute.

In 1963–1971, Panin worked as an assistant at the department of biochemistry of the Tomsk Medical Institute.

From 1971 to 1988, he headed the laboratory of biochemistry in the Research Institute of Clinical and Experimental Medicine SB AMS USSR (Novosibirsk) and in 1981–1987 he served as deputy director for scientific work in this organization. In 1989, Panin became director of the Research Institute of Biochemistry SB AMS USSR.

He was a board member of the International Union of Circumpolar Medicine.

Panin died November 20, 2013.

== Scientific interests ==
His research interests included homeostasis and metabolic types of humans in the conditions of the Far North and the Arctic; scientific foundations of rational nutrition in the severe climate of the North and Siberia; and the significance of resident macrophages for the regulation of gene expression.

== Work in scientific journals ==
He served on the editorial boards of the Nutrition Issues (Вопросы питания), Human Ecology (Экология человека), Physical Chemical Biology and Medicine.

== Awards ==
Panin was awarded the Order of Friendship of Peoples, medals and the badge "Overachiever in Health Care". He was also a laureate of the International Hildes Prize.
