= Makaroff =

Makaroff is a Germanized form of the Russian surnamer Makarov. Notable people with the surname include:

- Eduardo Makaroff
- Marika Makaroff
- Mia Makaroff
- Peter Makaroff
- Makaroff Brothers, Argentinian music duo:
  - Eduardo Makaroff
  - Sergio Makaroff
