= Siberian State Medical University =

University in Tomsk, Russia

- Сибирский государственный медицинский университет
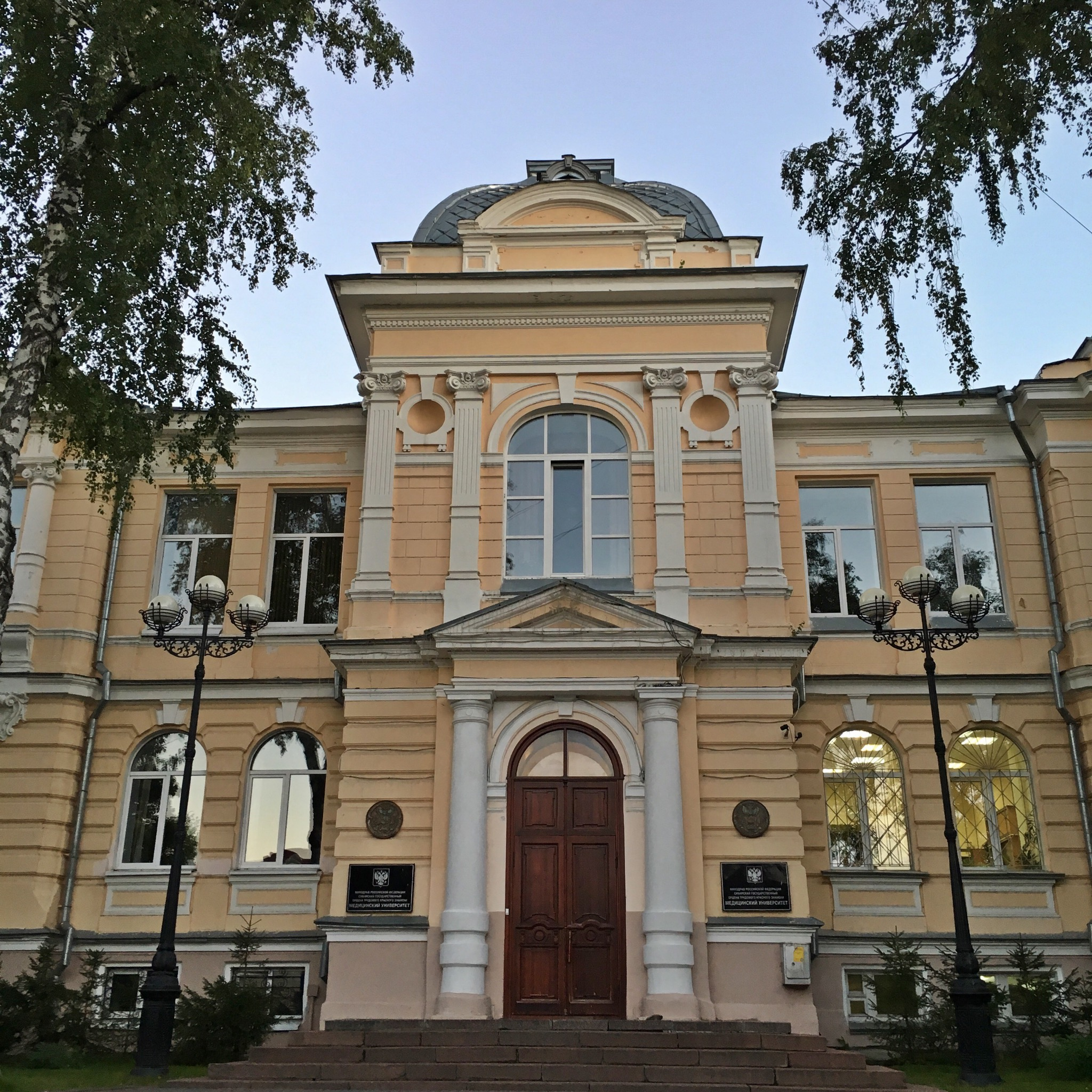
- Former names: The Siberian Imperial University (1878–1888); Tomsk University (1888–1934); Tomsk State Medical Institute (1930–1991); Tomsk State Medical Institute named after V.M. Molotov (1938–1956)
- Type: Public
- Established: 1888
- Rector: Evgeny S. Kulikov
- Academic staff: 790
- Students: 6788
- Location: 2 Moskovsky trakt, Tomsk, Tomsk Oblast, 634055, Russia, Tomsk, Russia
- Language: Russian, English
- Website: sibmed.ru/ru/

The Siberian State Medical University, SibMed (Russian: «Сибирский государственный медицинский университет», СибГМУ) is a public medical school in Tomsk, Russia. It was founded in May, 1878 by the decree of Emperor Alexander II. Today, Siberian State Medical University provides undergraduate, graduate, and postgraduate degrees in biochemistry, biophysics, general medicine, pediatrics, dentistry, pharmacy, and nursery fields. It is one of the few universities in Russia that has its own hospital that is not only providing medical care for citizens in Tomsk Region and other regions but, also, is a training center for students and medical professionals. It has more than 6 500 students that come from 39 countries worldwide. In 2017, SibMed obtained the status of the only flagship medical university in Russia.

== History ==
=== Siberian Imperial University 1888-1930 ===
Siberian Imperial University in Tomsk was founded in 1878. It was the ninth university opened in Russia at that time. The university started fully functioning only in 1888 when construction activities were over. For more than ten years, the Faculty of Medicine was the only faculty in the university. Shortly after the Faculty started operating, the construction of a university hospital and infectious diseases unit begun. In 1893, a Hygiene Unit was opened. Later, Imperial University grew to include an Outpatient Clinic and Bacteriological Institute. In 1907, three store buildings were given to Anatomy Institute that had one of the best Anatomy museums in Russia.

=== Tomsk State Medical Institute 1930-1991 ===
In 1930, Tomsk State Medical Institute was organized. It was independent institution, a merger of two faculties, Faculty of Medicine and Faculty of Sanitation and Hygiene that separated from Tomsk Imperial University. In 1938–1956, it was known as Medical Institute named after V.M. Molotov. Just before the World War II started, the Institute consisted of 2 faculties, 40 departments and 17 clinics with 700 beds. There was also a blood transfusion station, a vivarium with 1200 laboratory animals, 3 museums, a library with 150 thousand books. All professors, doctors and students were helping soldiers during the War. Some of them went directly to the battlefield, some of them were treating injured in the hospital in Tomsk.

In September 1945, the Tomsk Medical Institute received 2 400 students most of whom were demobilized soldiers. Some of the graduates in that period choose to continue their studies in Tomsk and proceed to a graduate school. Also, after war the Institute ‘s composition changed. The Institute could offer studies with 5 different faculties, Faculty of Medicine, Faculty of Sanitation and Hygiene, Faculty of Dentistry, Faculty of Pediatrics and Faculty of Pharmacy.

=== Siberian State Medical University 1992 ===
In 1992, Tomsk State Medical Institute was one of the first institutions in Russian Federation to receive the university status.

== Reputation ==
Siberian State Medical University is often regarded as one of the best academic institutions in Russia having medical profile. According to Interfax National Rankings, SibMed took 48th position among all Russian universities in 2019. Also, in 2019 it entered The Three University Missions Moscow International University Ranking, where it was ranked in 701-800 interval group among world universities and 25-32 interval group among all Russian universities. Based on Round University Rankings, SibMed enters the World League of universities.

== Departments ==
The university has the following departments:

- Department of General Medicine
- Department of Pediatrics
- Department of Pharmacy
- Department of Biomedicine
- Institute of Integrative Health
- Department of Professional Development and Retraining
- Department of Distance Learning

== Activities ==
=== Education ===
SibMed offers specialist degrees in general medicine, pharmacy, pediatrics and dentistry that usually take 5 to 6 years of study. For international students, general medicine degree has a fully English taught track. For those willing to specialize further in different medical fields, SibMed has more than 45 different residency tracks, namely allergy and immunology, diabetology, infectious diseases, endocrinology, plastic surgery, and many others. Residency studies are offered in Russian language. Students studying at SibMed have many options to practice their skills. SibMed has well quipped Simulation Center that provides various specialized training in emergency care, first aid and other topics. The center is equipped with AR technologies, 3D lecture halls, special wards that allow to simulate different medical situations. Also, medical professionals from the different Siberian regions can pursue their medical accreditation in the center.

A list of degrees conferred and the required study:

- Medical Doctor (MD) (6 years)
- Medical Doctor — Pediatrician (MD) (6 years)
- Master of Pharmacy (5 years)
- Doctor – Biochemist (6 years)
- Doctor – Biophysicist (6 years)
- Doctor – Cyberneticist (6 years)
- Economist – Manager in Health Care (5 years)
- Medical Nurse with Higher Education (4 years)
- Candidate of Medical Science (postgraduate program)
- Doctor of Medical Science (D.M.Sc. program)
- Clinical Psychologist (5.5 years)
- Social Worker (5 years)

=== Science and innovation ===
SibMed focuses its research activities in the following areas: increasing life expectancy and people's well-being, decreasing the burden of chronic noncommunicable diseases, finding new effective models for managing the health care systems, antimicrobial resistance, developing new medicines and a personalized approach based on the 4P model.

Digital Hospital is one of the projects that was designed to cover the issues related to health care systems management.

As part of its innovation strategy the university obtained the license to produce pharmaceuticals from the Ministry of Industry and Trade of the Russian Federation. SibMed Technology Transfer Center has necessary facilities, equipped production site that allows for production and testing of various medicines. The center, also, conducts pre-clinical testing of drugs developed by other universities or pharmaceuticals companies.

The vast part of the developments in SibMed were completed in collaboration with the industry partners. This was the case for virtual simulator to restore motor function in patients who have suffered a stroke. Moreover, the university research team developed a system for remote monitoring of chronic noncommunicable diseases and new generation telemedicine spirograph.

In 2019, SibMed received support for two projects in National Technological Initiative, 37 grant applications from Russian Scienсe Foundation and completed 35 research projects under partnership agreements. Also, it publishes 2 journals, namely Bulletin of Siberian Medicine and Drug Development & Registration, that are indexed in Scopus, and two in WoS.

=== International cooperation ===
SiBMed collaborates with the DAAD Academic Exchange Fund (Germany) and Fulbright Foundation Scholarship Program. Every year SibMed welcomes Fulbright scholars that take active part in helping developing English language proficiency among SibMed staff and students.

Many SibMed partnerships received an extensive support from European Union. In 2015, together with Tomsk State University, SibMed won the Erasmus + grant for the implementation of the project „Bridging Innovations, Health and Societies: Educational capacity building in the Eastern European Neighbouring Areas / BIHSENA“. In 2017, the university received another round of funding from EU Erasmus+ for the implementation of the educational project „Improving Healthcare Outcomes in Chronic Diseases - Enhancing the Curriculum at Masters Level / IHOD“. Moreover, the university received support for several applications for Erasmus +, Key Action-1 grants with the Medical University of Plovdiv (Bulgaria) and Leiden University (Netherlands) in 2019.

Tomsk Opisthorchiasis Consortium (TOPIC) is a collaboration of research groups from Russia, Netherlands, USA, Germany, Thailand, Switzerland, United Kingdom that focus on the study of liver fluke infections and associated diseases. The Consortium is aimed at intensifying studies that expand knowledge about the epidemiology, pathogenesis and long-term effects of invasion of the hepatic flukes, as well as allowing the development of new tools for the diagnosis, treatment and prevention of opisthorchiasis. TOPIC was initiated by SibMed team with the support from Russian Academy of Science, Pfizer company and Technology Platform “Medicine of the Future”.

== Hospital ==
SibMed Hospital is a teaching hospital of Siberian State Medical University in Tomsk, Russia. It is one of the main medical institutions in Tomsk Region, located in the city center of Tomsk. The hospital provides inpatient and outpatient care. Also, it has emergency care unit serving to Tomsk citizens several times a week.

SibMed Hospital is using modern equipment that allows to perform complicated surgeries in difficult medical cases. Also, it has well equipped diagnostics center.

The hospital consists of several specialized clinics:

- "Professor" multidisciplinary medical center,
- Assisted Reproductive Technology Center (ART Center)
- Obstetrics and Gynecology Clinic
- Urology Department
- Surgery Department
- Neurology Clinic
- Children's Clinic
- Endocrinology Department
- Rheumatology Department
- Ophthalmology Clinic
- Infectious Disease Clinics
- Surgical Oncology Department
- General Medicine Clinic
- Dental Clinic

== Alumni ==
- Alexander Sergeyevich Makarov
- Lev Panin
- Larisa Shoygu
