= Sergei Shoigu =

Russian politician (born 1955)

- Сергей Шойгу
- Official portrait, 2014

Secretary of the Security Council of the Russian Federation
- Incumbent
- Assumed office 12 May 2024
- Chairman: Vladimir Putin
- Preceded by: Nikolai Patrushev

7th Minister of Defence
- In office 6 November 2012 – 12 May 2024
- Prime Minister: Dmitry Medvedev; Mikhail Mishustin
- First Deputy: Arkady Bakhin; Ruslan Tsalikov
- Preceded by: Anatoly Serdyukov
- Succeeded by: Andrey Belousov

Chairman of the Council of Ministers of Defense of the CIS
- In office 11 December 2012 – 3 July 2024
- Preceded by: Anatoly Serdyukov
- Succeeded by: Andrey Belousov

Governor of Moscow Oblast
- In office 11 May 2012 – 6 November 2012
- Deputy: Ruslan Tsalikov
- Preceded by: Boris Gromov
- Succeeded by: Ruslan Tsalikov (acting)

Leader of United Russia
- In office 1 December 2001 – 27 November 2004 Serving with Yury Luzhkov and Mintimer Shaimiev
- Preceded by: Party established
- Succeeded by: Boris Gryzlov

Deputy Prime Minister of Russia
- In office 10 January 2000 – 18 May 2000
- Prime Minister: Vladimir Putin; Mikhail Kasyanov (acting)

Leader of Unity
- In office 3 October 1999 – 1 December 2001

Minister of Emergency Situations
- In office 17 April 1991 – 11 May 2012
- President: List: Boris Yeltsin; Vladimir Putin; Dmitry Medvedev; Vladimir Putin
- Prime Minister: List: Ivan Silayev; Oleg Lobov (acting); Boris Yeltsin (as President); Yegor Gaidar (acting); Viktor Chernomyrdin; Sergey Kiriyenko; Viktor Chernomyrdin (acting); Yevgeny Primakov; Sergei Stepashin; Vladimir Putin; Mikhail Kasyanov; Viktor Khristenko (acting); Mikhail Fradkov; Viktor Zubkov; Vladimir Putin; Viktor Zubkov (acting); Dmitry Medvedev
- Preceded by: Office established
- Succeeded by: Ruslan Tsalikov (acting); Vladimir Puchkov

Member of the Security Council of the Russian Federation
- In office 6 November 2012 – 12 May 2024

Personal details
- Born: 21 May 1955 (age 71) Chadan, Tuvan Autonomous Oblast, Russian SFSR, Soviet Union
- Party: Communist Party of the Soviet Union (1977–1991); Independent (1991–1995); Our Home – Russia (1995–1999); Unity (1999–2001); United Russia (2001–present)
- Spouse: Irina Shoigu
- Children: 2, including Yulia
- Parent: Kuzhuget Shoigu (father)
- Relatives: Larisa Shoigu (sister)
- Education: Krasnoyarsk Polytechnical Institute
- Awards: Hero of the Russian Federation; Order of St. Andrew (with swords)
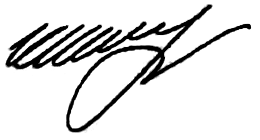
- Signature

Military service
- Allegiance: Russia
- Branch/service: Ministry of Emergency Situations; Russian Armed Forces; Military Council of the Civil Defence Troops
- Years of service: 1991–present
- Rank: General of the Army
- Battles/wars: Insurgency in the North Caucasus; Syrian Civil War; Russo-Ukrainian War; Annexation of Crimea; Russo-Ukrainian war (2022–present) (chairman)
- Sergey Shoigu's voice Recorded 16 September 2020

Sergei Kuzhugetovich Shoigu (Note: Russian: Сергей Кужугетович Шойгу, romanized: Sergey Kuzhugetovich Shoygu, IPA: [sʲɪrˈɡʲej kʊʐʊˈɡʲetəvʲɪtɕ ʂɐjˈɡu]; Tuvan: Сергей Күжүгет оглу Шойгу, romanized: Sergey Kyzhyget oglu Shoygu, IPA [siɾˈɡɛj kyʒyˈɣɛt ɔˈɣlu ʃɔjˈɣu].) (Note: In this name that follows East Slavic naming customs, the patronymic is Kuzhugetovich and the family name is Shoigu. The correct name should be Sergei Shoiguevich Kuzhuget as the Soviet official swapped the name of his father, Shoigu Kuzhuget to Kuzhuget Shoigu.) (born 21 May 1955) is a Russian politician and military officer who has served as secretary of the Security Council since 2024. He served as Minister of Defence of Russia from 2012 to 2024. Shoigu served as the chairman of the Council of Ministers of Defense of the Commonwealth of Independent States from 2012 to 2024.

Shoigu was the Minister of Emergency Situations from 1991 to 2012. He briefly served as the governor of Moscow Oblast in 2012. A close confidant and ally of president Vladimir Putin, Shoigu belongs to the siloviki of Putin's inner circle. He was entrusted with the task of supervising the Russo-Ukrainian war since 2022. A feud between Shoigu and Yevgeny Prigozhin led to a mutiny by the Wagner Group in June 2023. The International Criminal Court has issued an arrest warrant for Shoigu on charges of alleged war crimes during the Russian invasion of Ukraine.

In May 2024, Putin replaced Shoigu with Andrey Belousov as defense minister, appointing the former to be the secretary of the Security Council of the Russian Federation.

== Early life and education ==
Shoigu was born on 21 May 1955 in Chadan, Tuvan Autonomous Oblast, to an ethnic Tuvan father, newspaper editor Kuzhuget Shoigu (Note: Born Shoigu Kuzhuget, the Soviet officials swapped the name and surname.) (1921–2010) and a Ukrainian-born Russian mother, Alexandra Yakovlevna Shoigu (1924–2011). Alexandra Shoigu grew up in the Donbas town of Kadiivka and had traumatizing experiences while under detention of the German occupation forces during World War II. Later in her career she became a member of the Tuva Regional Council of People's Deputies. Kuzhuget Shoigu rose to secretary of the Tuvan Regional Committee of the Communist Party, becoming a major figure in the Communist power structure of the republic.

After graduating from Kyzyl Number 1 School in the Tuvan ASSR, Shoigu studied at the Krasnoyarsk Polytechnic Institute. Shoigu graduated in 1977 with a degree in civil engineering.

== Early career and first steps in CPSU ==
Shoigu worked in construction projects nationwide for the next decade, advancing from low levels to become an executive. In 1988, Shoigu became a minor functionary in the Abakan branch of the Communist Party of the Soviet Union, and then in the Komsomol for a few years. In 1990, Shoigu moved to Moscow from Siberia, and was appointed deputy chairman of the State Architecture and Construction Committee of the Russian Federation, assisted by his father's connections. Future president Boris Yeltsin had held a similar position in the Construction Committee, and had also come from a civil engineering and party background, so Shoigu gained Yeltsin's trust.

== Minister of Emergency Situations (1991–2012) ==
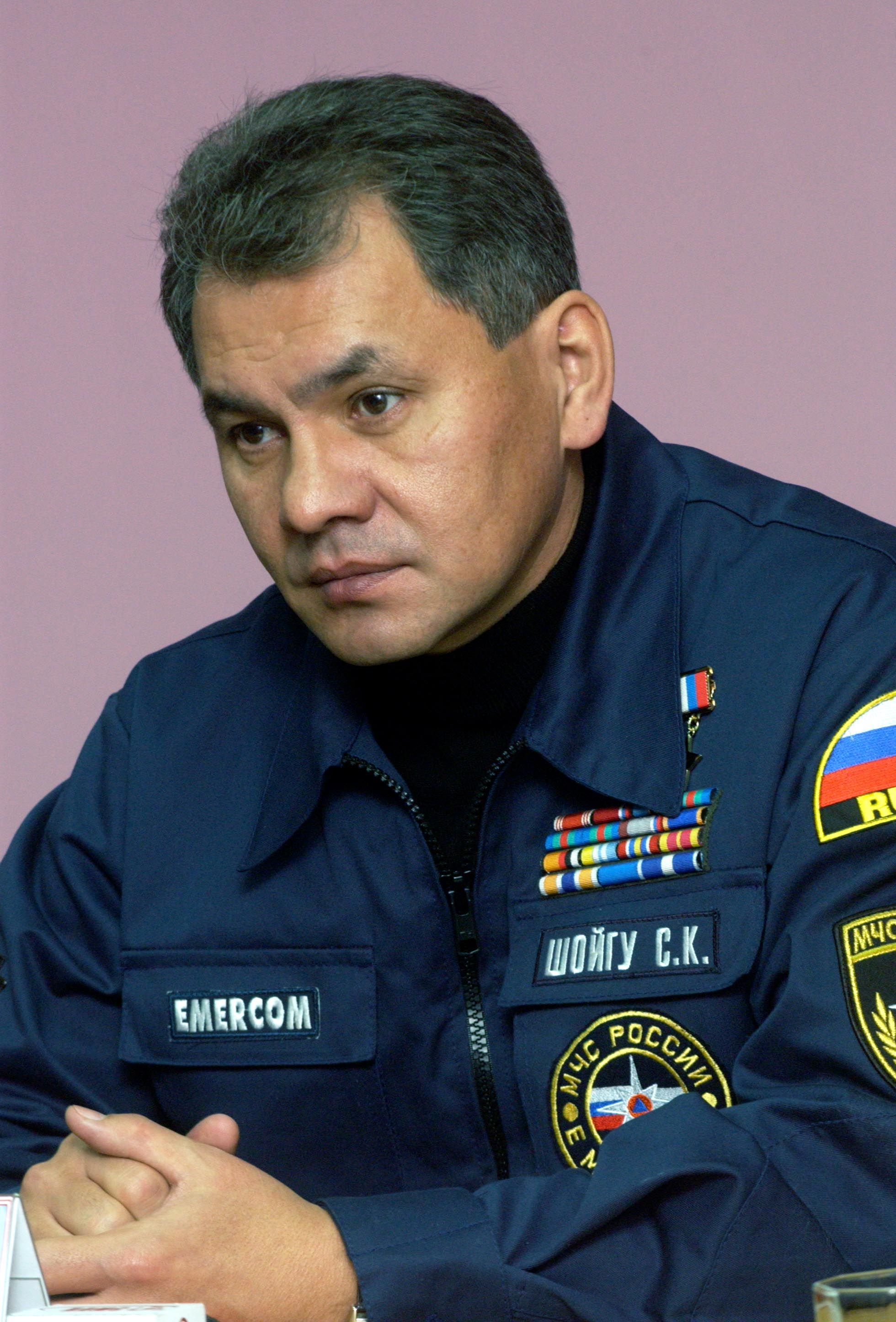
Shoigu as Minister of Emergency Situations, 2003

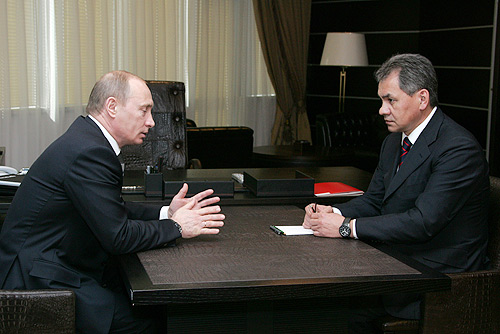
Shoigu and Vladimir Putin in April 2008

In 1991, Yeltsin appointed him head of the newly established Russian Rescue Corps, responsible for the rescue and disaster response system. The Rescue Corps replaced the previous Soviet civil defense system and soon absorbed the 20,000-strong militarized Civil Defense Troops of the Ministry of Defense, with Shoigu being appointed chairman of the State Committee of the Russian Federation for Civil Defense, Emergency Situations and Elimination of the Consequences of Natural Disasters. Civil Defense remained a quasi-military organization in continuation of Soviet practice and Shoigu was politically involved, such as an unsuccessful attempt to evacuate Russian-backed Afghan president Mohammad Najibullah in 1992 and the intended distribution of weapons from the Civil Defense stocks to Yeltsin supporters during the October 1993 coup. In keeping with the militarized nature of Russian civil defense, Shoigu received the rank of major general in 1993, and was promoted swiftly to lieutenant general in 1995, colonel general in 1998, and to army general, in practice the highest Russian military rank, in 2003. The committee was renamed the Ministry of Emergency Situations (MChS) in 1994, making Shoigu a government minister. He became popular because of his hands-on management style and high visibility during emergency situations, such as floods, earthquakes and acts of terrorism. Under Shoigu, the responsibilities of the ministry were expanded to take over the Russian State Fire Service in 2002, making the MChS Russia's third-largest force structure.

In 1999 he became one of the leaders of the Russian pro-government party Unity, created by the Kremlin in opposition to the anti-Yeltsin elites of the Fatherland – All Russia alliance. Unity allowed for the rise of Vladimir Putin to president and in 2001 was combined into the ruling United Russia party, although Shoigu was the only delegate to vote against the merger. In 1999, Shoigu was awarded Russia's most prestigious state award: Hero of the Russian Federation.

In March 2009, he proposed a law that would criminalize criticism of Soviet military tactics during World War II, which resulted in large numbers of Soviet casualties.

== Governor of Moscow Oblast (2012) ==
With over twenty years of service as Minister of Emergency Situations, Shoigu established a close relationship with Vladimir Putin, and was rewarded by being appointed Governor of Moscow Oblast in 2012, taking office on 11 May of that year.

== Minister of Defence (2012–2024) ==
On 6 November 2012, Shoigu was appointed Minister of Defence by Putin, succeeding Anatoly Serdyukov, who had implemented sweeping reforms of the Russian Armed Forces in response to performance in the Russo-Georgian War. According to expert Sergey Smirnov, the so called "Petersburg group" of siloviki (Sergei Ivanov, Sergey Chemezov and Viktor Ivanov) had wanted one of its associates to succeed Serdyukov, but Putin was reluctant to strengthen the clan and opted for the neutral Shoigu. As defence minister, Shoigu on multiple occasions accompanied Putin during weekend breaks that the pair would spend at undisclosed locations in the Siberian countryside.

Serdyukov was unpopular with senior military leaders and seen by them as a civilian with no military background, something that Shoigu attempted to address by symbolically tying himself to the military through wearing an army general's uniform, reviving historical units dissolved under the reforms, and reinstating officials dismissed by Serdyukov. Furthermore, Shoigu appealed for support for reform within the army rather than taking a confrontational stance, appointed deputy ministers of defense from the military, and removed Serdyukov-appointed civilian tax service officials from the top echelons of the Ministry of Defense.

As defence minister, Shoigu continued aspects of Serdyukov's attempts at modernizing the Russian Armed Forces through reform. This included the creation of the Special Operations Forces Command to facilitate rapid intervention in conflicts within the perceived Russian sphere of influence and counterterrorism efforts. Serdyukov's goals of increasing the share of the Russian Armed Forces made up of professional contract servicemen rather than conscripts continued under Shoigu. However, the demographic challenge of a decreasing pool of military-aged and -eligible males forced him to increase national conscription quotas in early 2013, including even North Caucasians perceived as a security risk by authorities such as Chechens. This followed on from Serdyukov's initiatives of reducing available draft exemptions.

In November 2012, Shoigu decided to resurrect the tradition of Suvorov and Nakhimov cadets participating in the 9 May parade.

In July 2013 Shoigu ordered commanders to begin every morning in the barracks with a rendition of the Russian anthem, to compile an obligatory military-patriotic book reading list and to take responsibility for the preparation of demobilization albums (a type of memento scrapbook, which in Russian military tradition is given to conscripts upon completion of their service). In August 2013 he ordered all Defense Ministry civilian workers, other staff and management employees to wear uniforms.

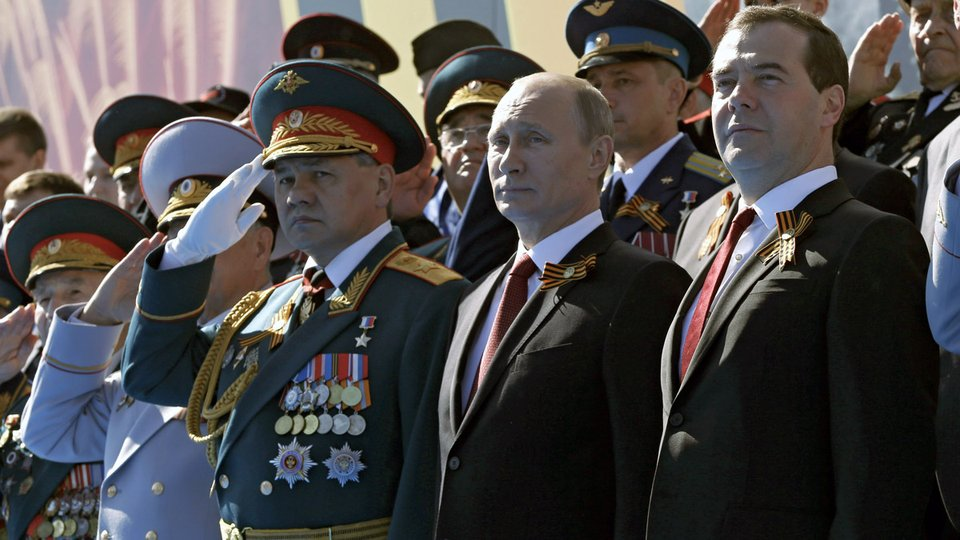
Shoigu, Vladimir Putin and Dmitry Medvedev at the Moscow Victory Day Parade, May 2014

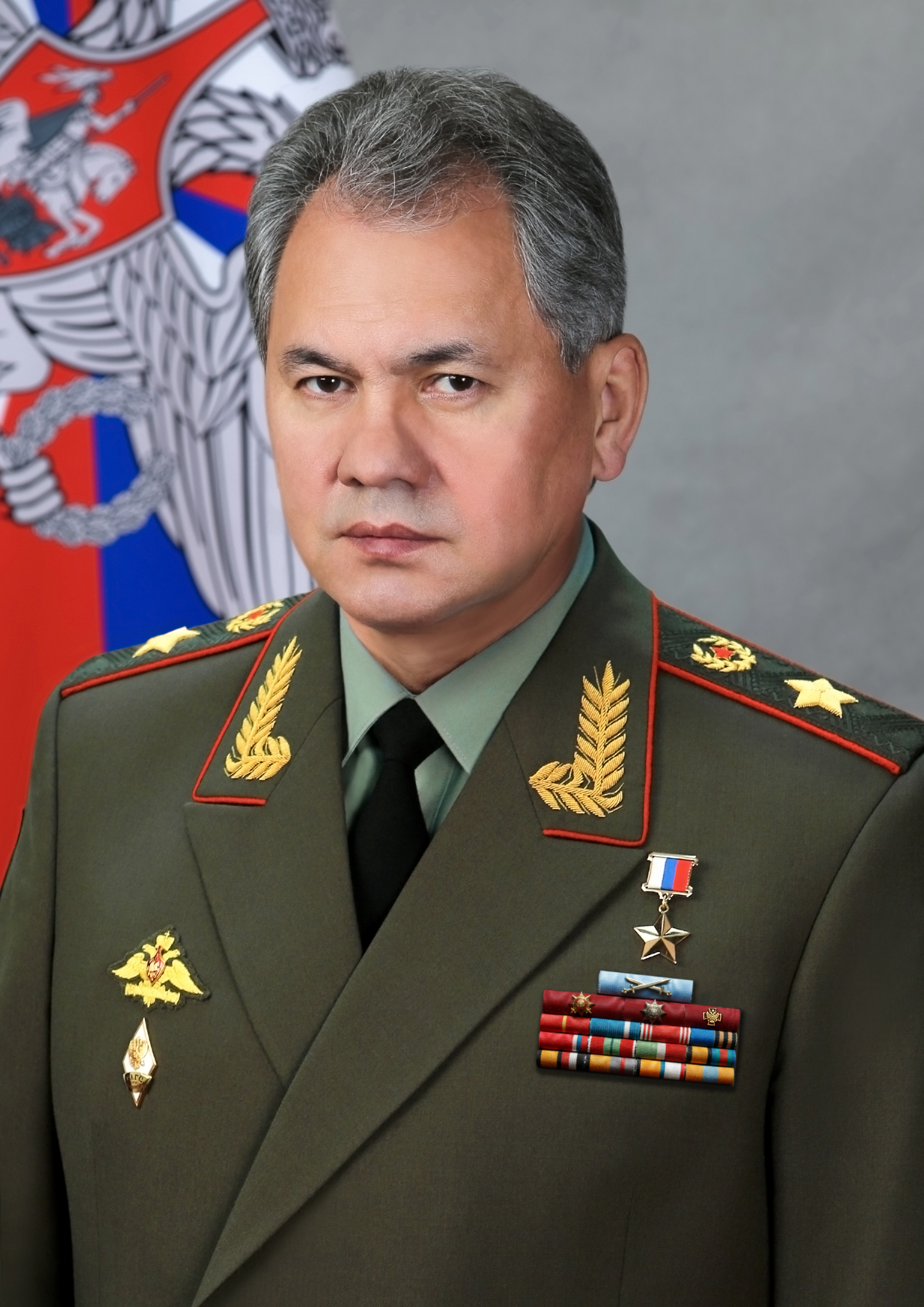
Shoigu's official portrait as Minister of Defence of the Russian Federation, c. 2014

In February 2014, Shoigu said Russia was planning to sign agreements with Vietnam, Cuba, Venezuela, Nicaragua, the Seychelles, Singapore, and several other countries either to house permanent military bases and/or to house airplane refueling stations in those countries. Over the next year, only an agreement with Vietnam was effectively signed.

=== Activities related to treaties and military exercises ===
From early 2013 the Shoigu ministry made use of snap exercises as a means to ensure combat readiness of the Eastern Military District, the Western Military District, and the Central Military District. Already in 2015 western observers mentioned the Vienna Document while they spoke of "the deteriorating European security environment.. producing an action-reaction cycle involving Russia, NATO and other European countries, all seeking to demonstrate the readiness of their armed forces."

In March 2015 Russia under Shoigu's defence ministry halted all activities related to the Treaty on Conventional Armed Forces in Europe.

In October 2016 Shoigu hosted 56 representatives from 31 different OSCE nations, with Shoigu stating that the observers "had a chance to see with their own eyes that Russia had fully implemented its obligations on ensuring confidence and security in Europe". The observers were also shown new weapons deployed to the Russian Aerospace Force, Ground and Airborne Forces. The previous visit of the OSCE observers took place in 2011.

=== Activities related to the revolution in Ukraine ===
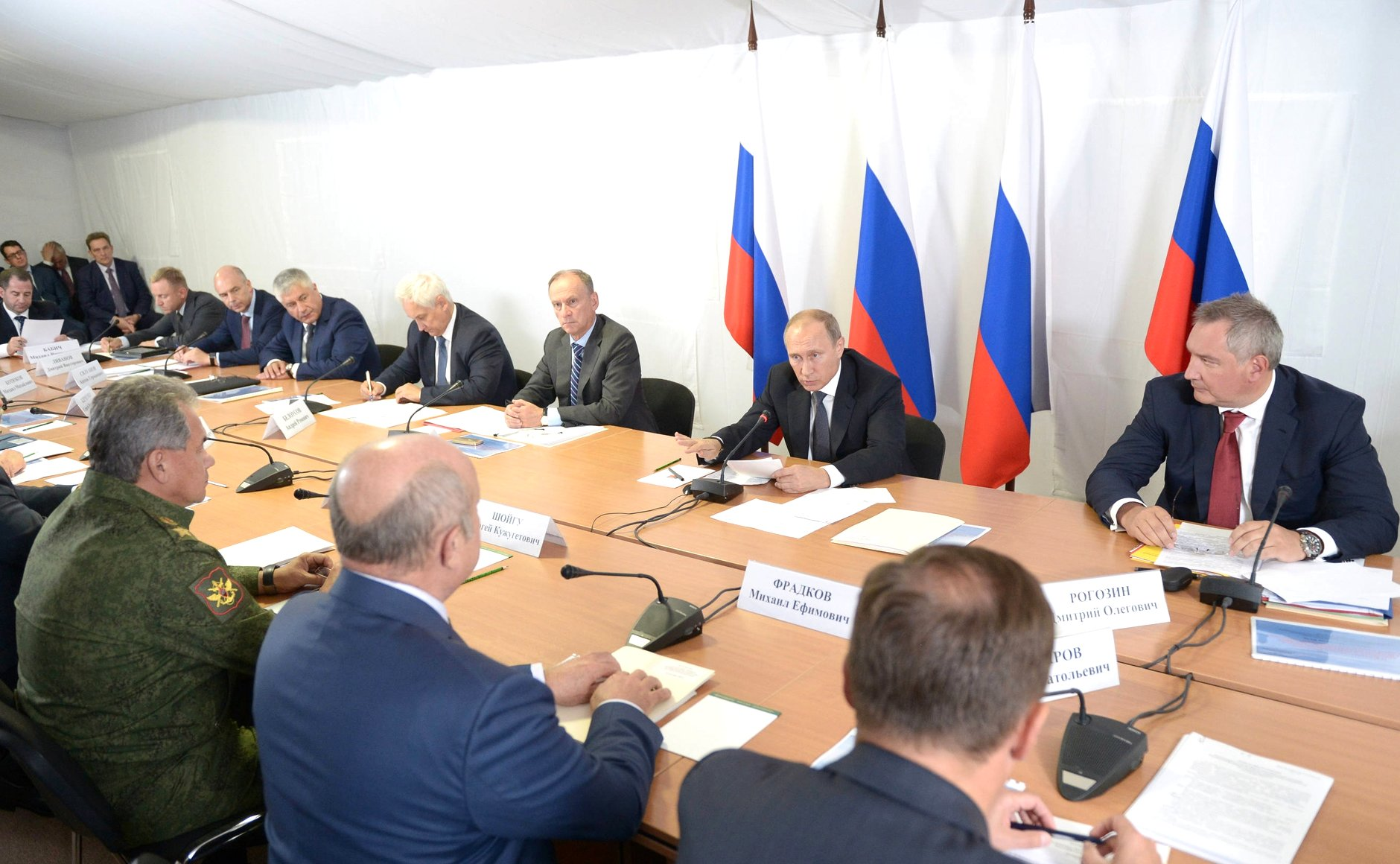
Shoigu, Putin, Nikolai Patrushev and Dmitry Rogozin at a meeting of the Military-Industrial Commission of Russia on 19 September 2015

In July 2014, Ukraine opened a criminal case against Shoigu. He was accused of helping to form "illegal military groups" in Eastern Ukraine who at the time fought against the Ukrainian army. The Ukrainian authorities alleged that Shoigu coordinated all of DPR Supreme Commander Igor Girkin's actions, supplying him and "other terrorist leaders" with "the most destructive weapons" since May and instructing him directly, with Putin's approval.

In July 2016 Shoigu said that he had "deployed more air defense systems in the southwest [of Russia]" and "also deployed a 'self-sufficient' contingent of troops in Crimea", adding "Since 2013 ... we have formed four divisions, nine brigades and 22 regiments. They include two missile brigades armed with Iskander missile complexes, which has allowed to boost fire power to destroy the potential adversary."

In July 2018 Shoigu warned that the Poroshenko administration of Ukraine was not fulfilling the Minsk agreements which were signed in order to end the war in Donbas.

=== Activities related to Syria ===
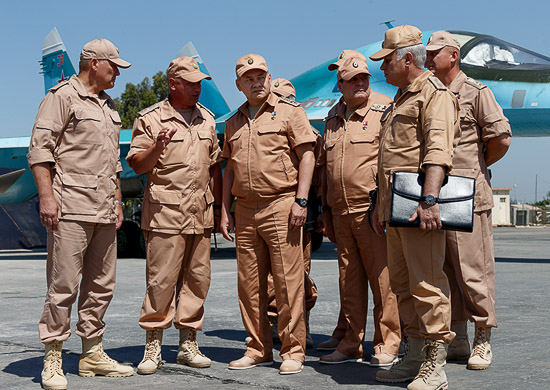
Shoigu and Dvornikov (2nd from the left) alongside other Russian advisors at Khmeimim Air Base, June 2016

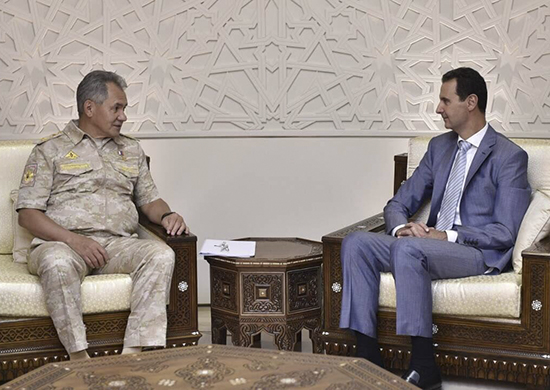
Shoigu with Syrian president Bashar al-Assad, September 2017

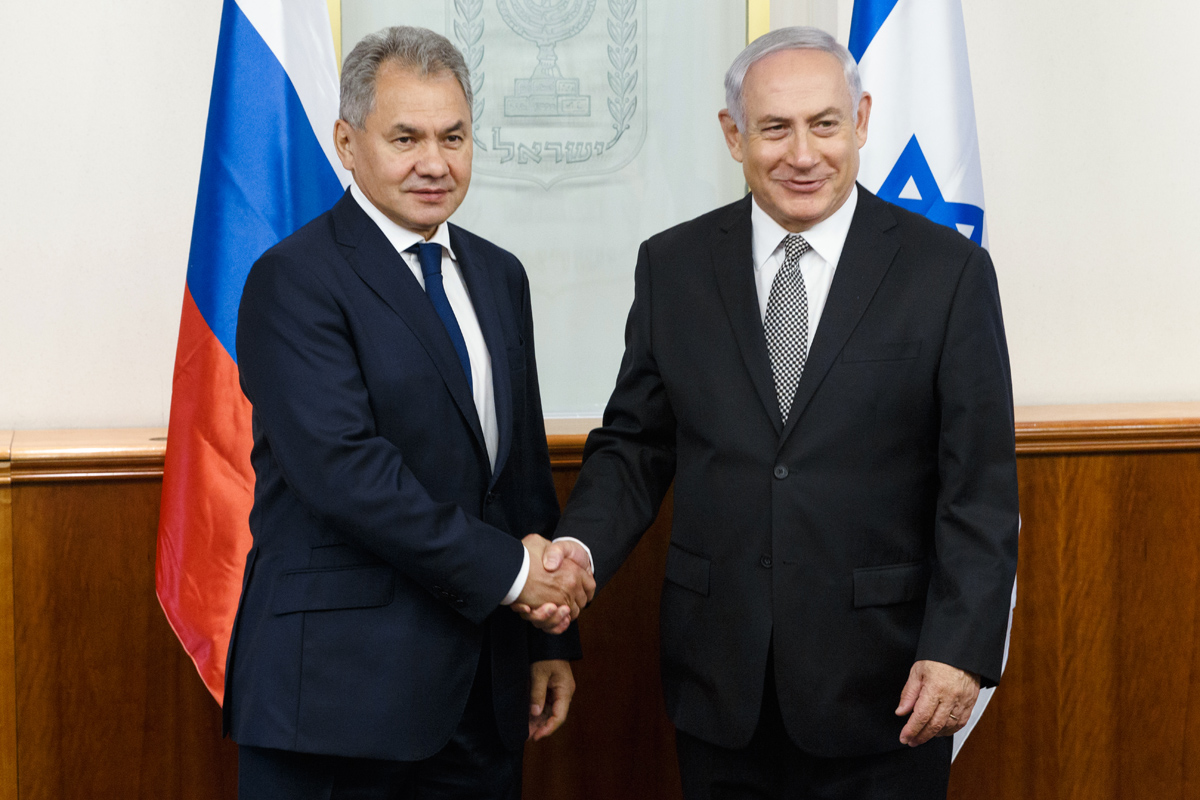
Shoigu with Israeli prime minister Benyamin Netanyahu, October 2017

On 30 September 2015, Russia began a military operation in Syria. The operation was carried out by the Russian Aerospace Forces, with the support of the Russian Navy and Bashar al-Assad's Syrian Armed Forces.

On 16 December 2015, speaking to the members of the State Duma behind closed doors, Shoigu mentioned the possibility of the Russian forces "reaching the Euphrates" in Syria.

In June 2016, Russia Today, while reporting minister Shoigu's visit to Hmeymim air base, showed RBK-500 ZAB-2.5SM incendiary cluster bombs being loaded onto Russian airplanes. After this information was discovered to be inconsistent with official Russian statements, the video was removed. It was later reinstated. An editorial note below the video made no mention of the weapon, saying a frame in the video has caused "concern for personnel safety" because of a pilot's close-up. "Upon re-evaluation it was deemed that the frame did not pose any risks; it had since been restored and the video is up in its original cut", the RT statement said.

On 11 December 2017, days after declaring Syria had been "completely liberated" from ISIL and with the campaign liberating the western bank of the Euphrates in its final days, Putin visited the Russian base in Syria, where he announced that he had ordered the partial withdrawal of the forces deployed to Syria. Several hours later, Shoigu said the troops had already begun to return.

On 26 December 2017, Shoigu said that Russia had set about "forming a permanent grouping" at the Tartus naval facility and the Hmeymim airbase, after Putin approved their structure and personnel strength. On the same day, the upper chamber of parliament approved the ratification of an agreement between Russia and Syria on expanding the Tartus naval facility, which envisages turning it into a full-fledged naval base.

On 17 September 2018, during multiple missile strikes by Israeli F-16 jets at targets in western Syria, Russia's Il-20 ELINT reconnaissance plane returning to Khmeimim Air Base, with 15 Russian servicemen on board, was inadvertently downed by a Syrian S-200 surface-to-air missile. Russia's defence minister the following day blamed Israel's military for the accident and re-affirmed its stance in a minute-by-minute report presented on 23 September. Early on 20 September, Russia's government-run news agency reported Russia had announced multiple areas of eastern Mediterranean "near Syria, Lebanon, and Cyprus" shut for air and sea traffic until 26 September, due to the Russian Navy's drills in the area. Following the shoot down incident, Shoigu on 24 September said that within two weeks, the Syrian army would receive S-300 air-defense missile systems to strengthen Syria's combat air defence capabilities; a series of other military measures were announced such as radio-electronic jamming of "satellite navigation, onboard radars and communications systems used by military aircraft attacking targets in Syrian territory", in the areas of the Mediterranean off the Syrian coast.

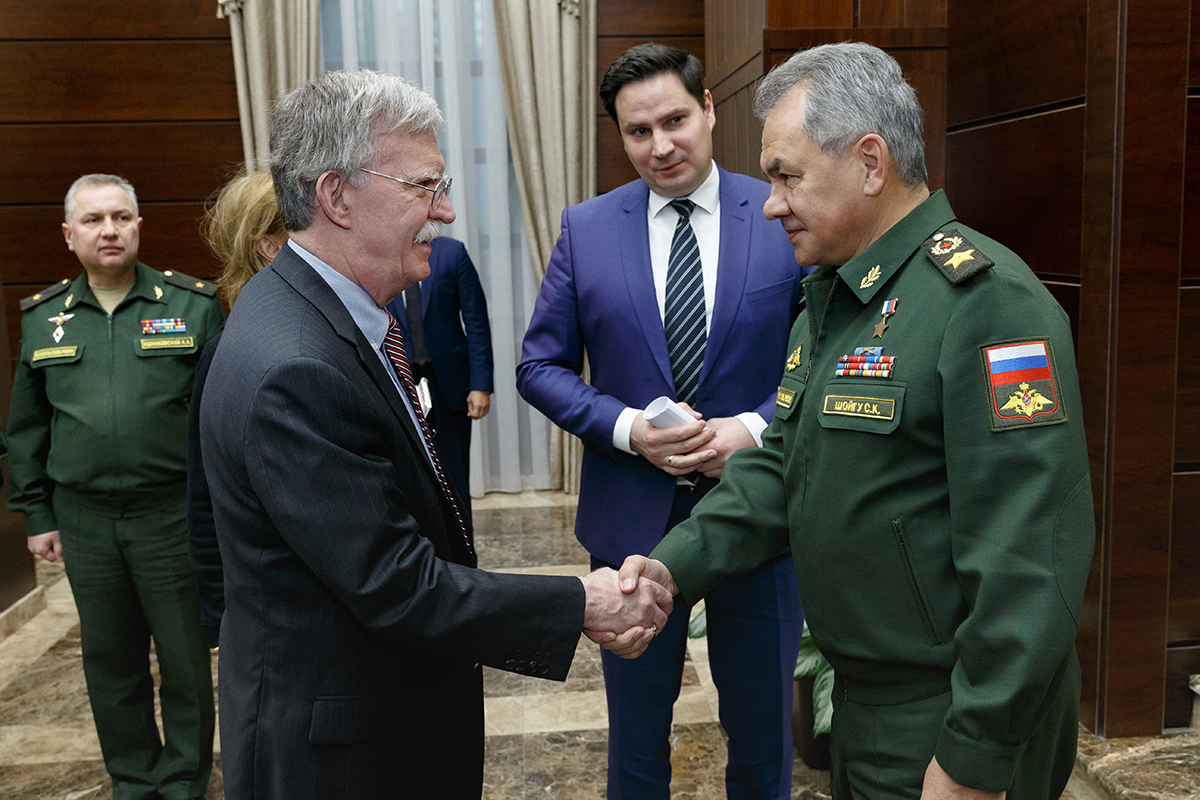
Shoigu meets U.S. National Security Advisor John R. Bolton in Moscow in October 2018.

Shoigu said in August 2021 that Russia had tested 320 new weapons over the course of its campaign in Syria.

=== In Medvedev government ===
Shoigu was reappointed as defence minister in 2018 in the Medvedev second government.

=== In Mishustin government ===
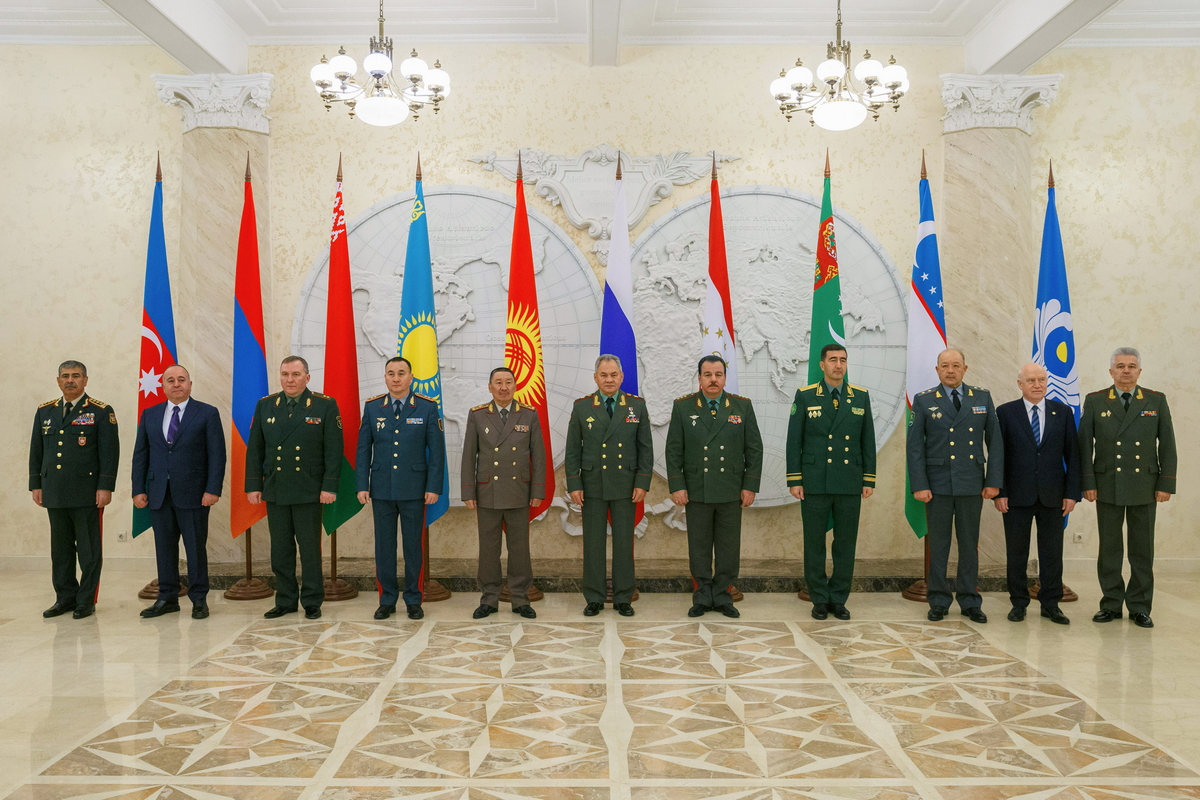
Members of the Council of Ministers of Defense of the CIS at the meeting in Moscow in November 2021

Shoigu was reappointed as defence minister in 2020 in the Mishustin government.

In an August 2021 "Solovyov Live" YouTube channel interview, Shoigu said referring to his tenure in the Ministry that "The requirements for fulfilling the defense procurement plan have risen dramatically. Over the past nine years, we have received 15,500 weapon systems for the ground forces. In 1999–2002, we had gotten 10 or 19 aircraft at best, that is, fixed- and rotary-wing aircraft all together. That's why now that we receive 140–150 aircraft annually, this is quite a different story."

In August 2021, Shoigu praised military cooperation between Russia and China.

=== Activities related to 2022 invasion of Ukraine ===
On 29 August 2021, Shoigu was recorded as saying that "Russia doesn't consider Ukraine as threat", while he expressed the hope that the situation in Ukraine would ultimately change and the "nationalist mayhem" would be stopped. Shoigu said that the Ukrainians "are not just our neighbors, we are a single people".

On 11 February 2022, Shoigu met UK Defense Secretary Ben Wallace. Shoigu denied that Russia was planning an invasion of Ukraine. Wallace agreed at the meeting which also included General Valery Gerasimov that it was important to implement the Minsk agreements "as a clear way forward".

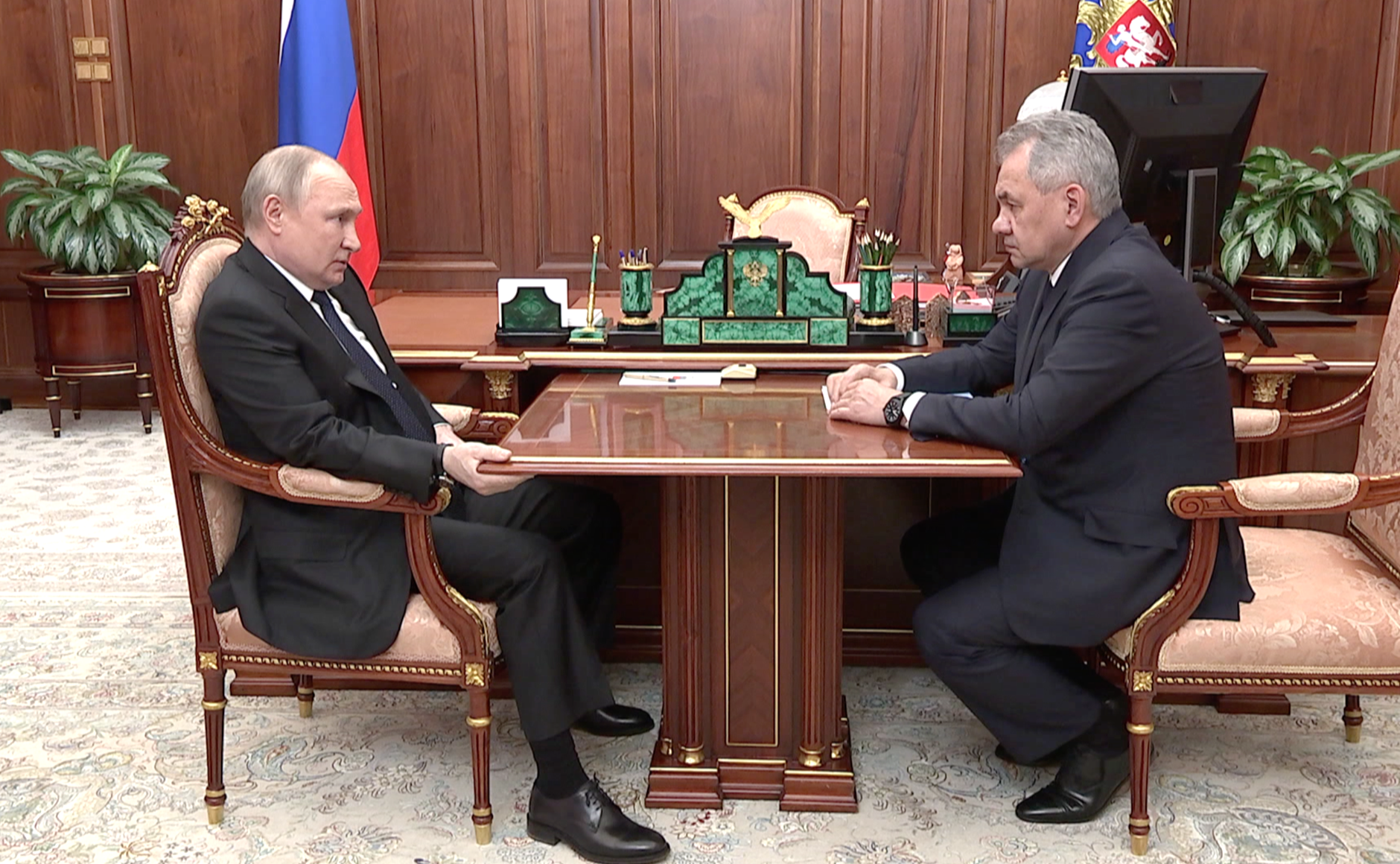
Putin meeting with Shoigu in April 2022, after Russia's defeat at the Battle of Kyiv

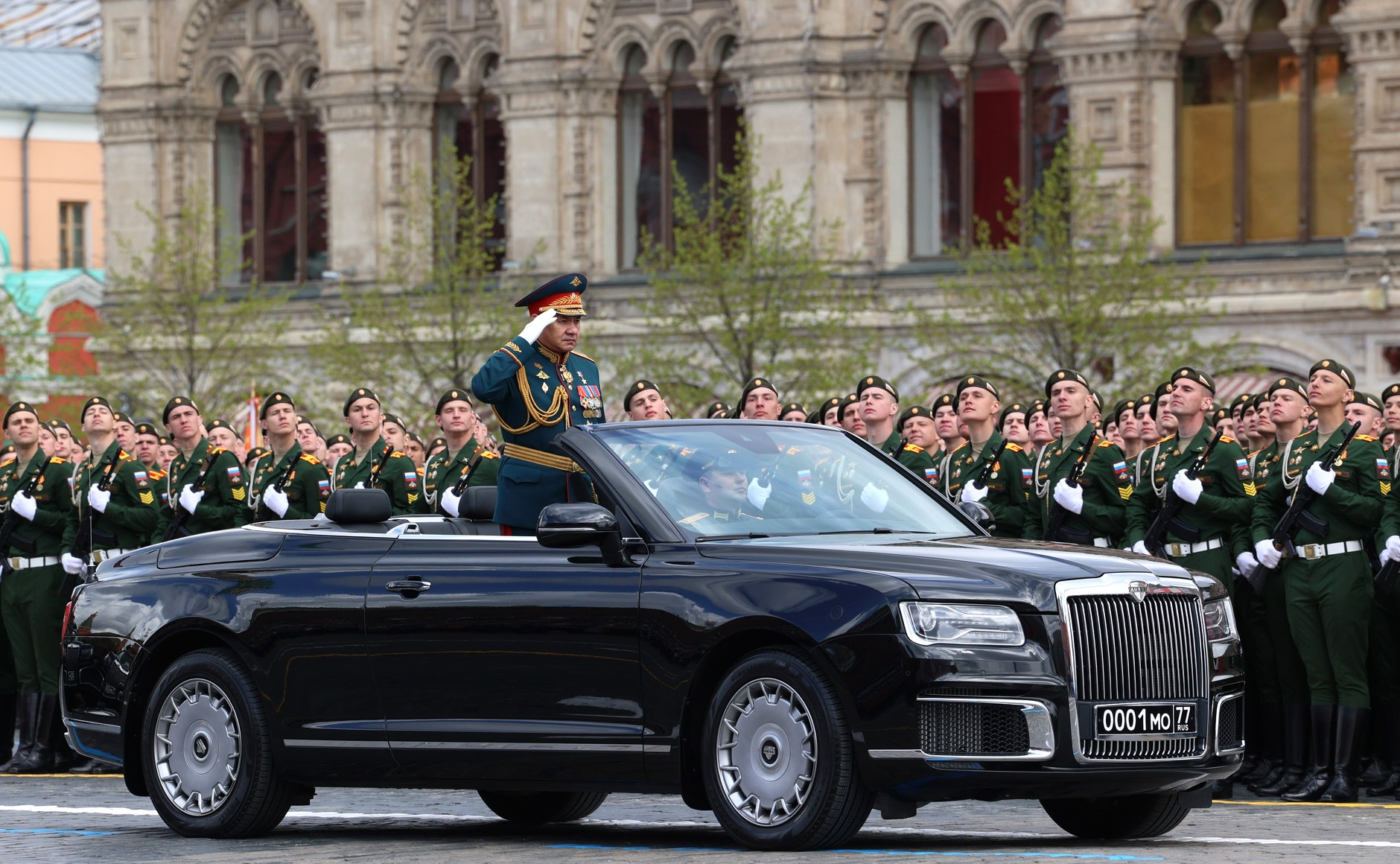
Shoigu in May 2022

On 24 February 2022, Russia launched a large-scale military invasion of Ukraine. Shoigu said the purpose of the invasion "is to protect the Russian Federation from the military threat posed by Western countries, who are trying to use the Ukrainian people in the fight against our country". The sources say the decision to invade Ukraine was made by Putin and a small group of war hawks in Putin's inner circle, including Sergei Shoigu and Putin's national security adviser Nikolai Patrushev. In a 11 March video conference with Putin, Shoigu claimed that "everything is going to plan".

On 24 April, Putin decided to broadcast with English subtitles an 11-minute long Siege of Mariupol situation report meeting with Shoigu.

On 13 May, U.S. Secretary of Defense Lloyd Austin initiated a telephone conversation with Shoigu, the first call since 18 February. The call lasted about an hour with Austin urging an immediate ceasefire in Ukraine.

Also on 13 May, former FSB officer and former DPR Supreme Commander Igor Girkin harshly criticized Shoigu, accusing him of "criminal negligence" in conducting the invasion.

On 16 August, Shoigu said that Russia does not need to use nuclear weapons in Ukraine, as "its main purpose is to deter a nuclear attack. Its use is limited to extraordinary circumstances."

At the 10th Moscow Conference on International Security in August 2022, Shoigu hosted 35 defense ministers from Asia, Africa and Latin America. He described South Africa as a "friendly state" and that South Africa's support has helped counter NATO pressure on Russia.

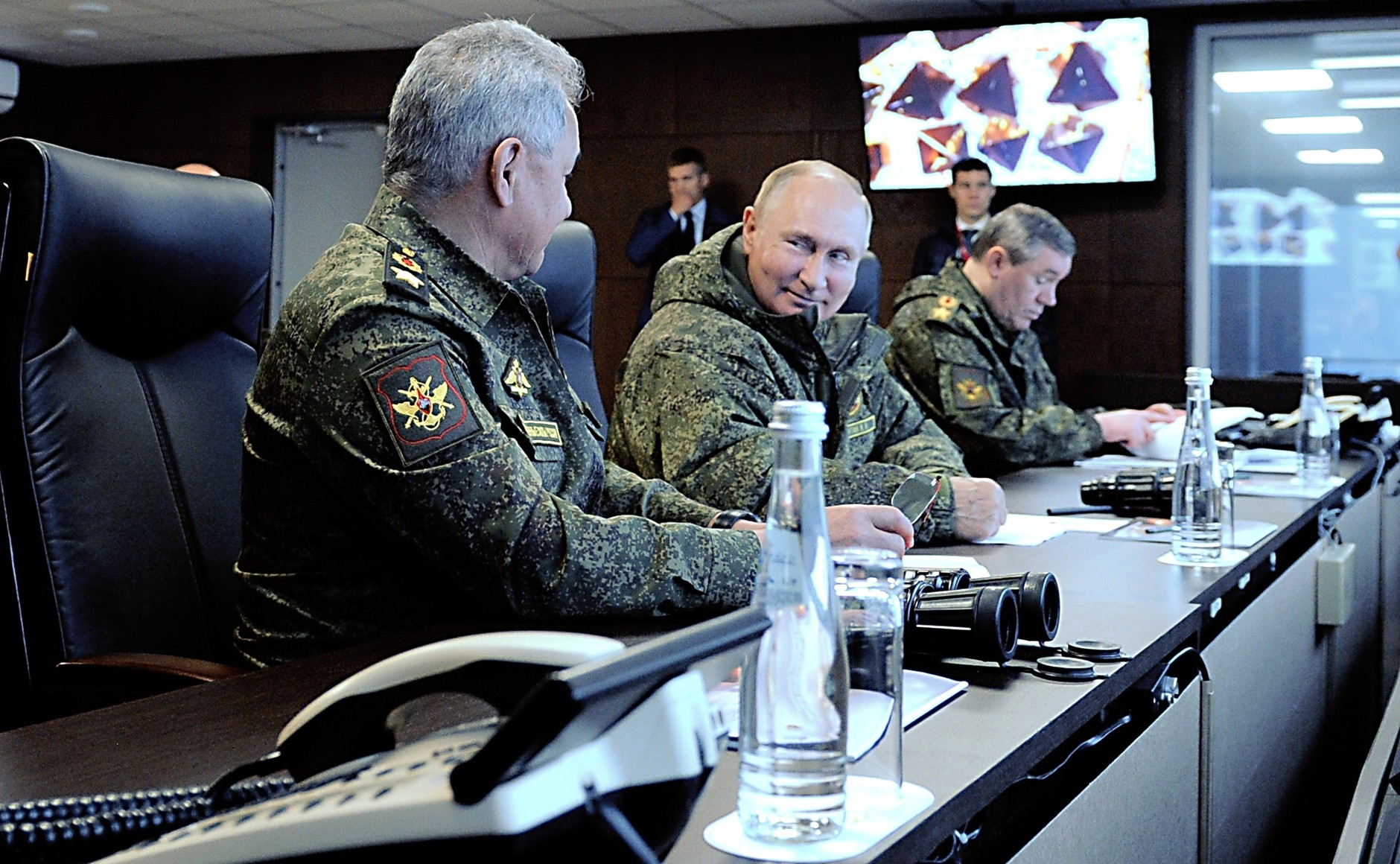
Putin, Shoigu and Gerasimov at the Vostok-2022 military exercise in the Russian Far East, September 2022

Shoigu and Putin attended the Vostok-2022 military exercise in the Russian Far East. Beyond Russian troops, the exercises also included military forces from China, India, Mongolia and several post-Soviet states, among others.

After large Ukrainian counteroffensives in September 2022, Igor Girkin said that Shoigu should be executed by firing squad. The Russia-installed governor of Ukraine's Kherson region Kirill Stremousov said in a video shared on social media that "Many are saying that the Defense Minister – who allowed things to come to this – should simply shoot himself like a [real] officer."

On 21 September 2022, Shoigu said in a televised speech that Russia was not so much at war with Ukraine and the Ukrainian army as with the "collective West" and NATO.

In September 2022, Shoigu claimed that 5,397 Russian soldiers had been killed in the war in Ukraine. He said that the 2022 Russian mobilization is being carried out to control "already liberated territories" in Ukraine. According to Shoigu, it is planned to mobilize 300,000 reservists. Shoigu said the mobilized people could only be sent to combat zones after "training and combat coordination". However, some of the mobilized Russian men were killed less than two weeks after being drafted, meaning conscripted civilians are being sent to a combat zone without basic military training. On 28 October, Shoigu said that 82,000 mobilized reservists had already been deployed in the combat zone.

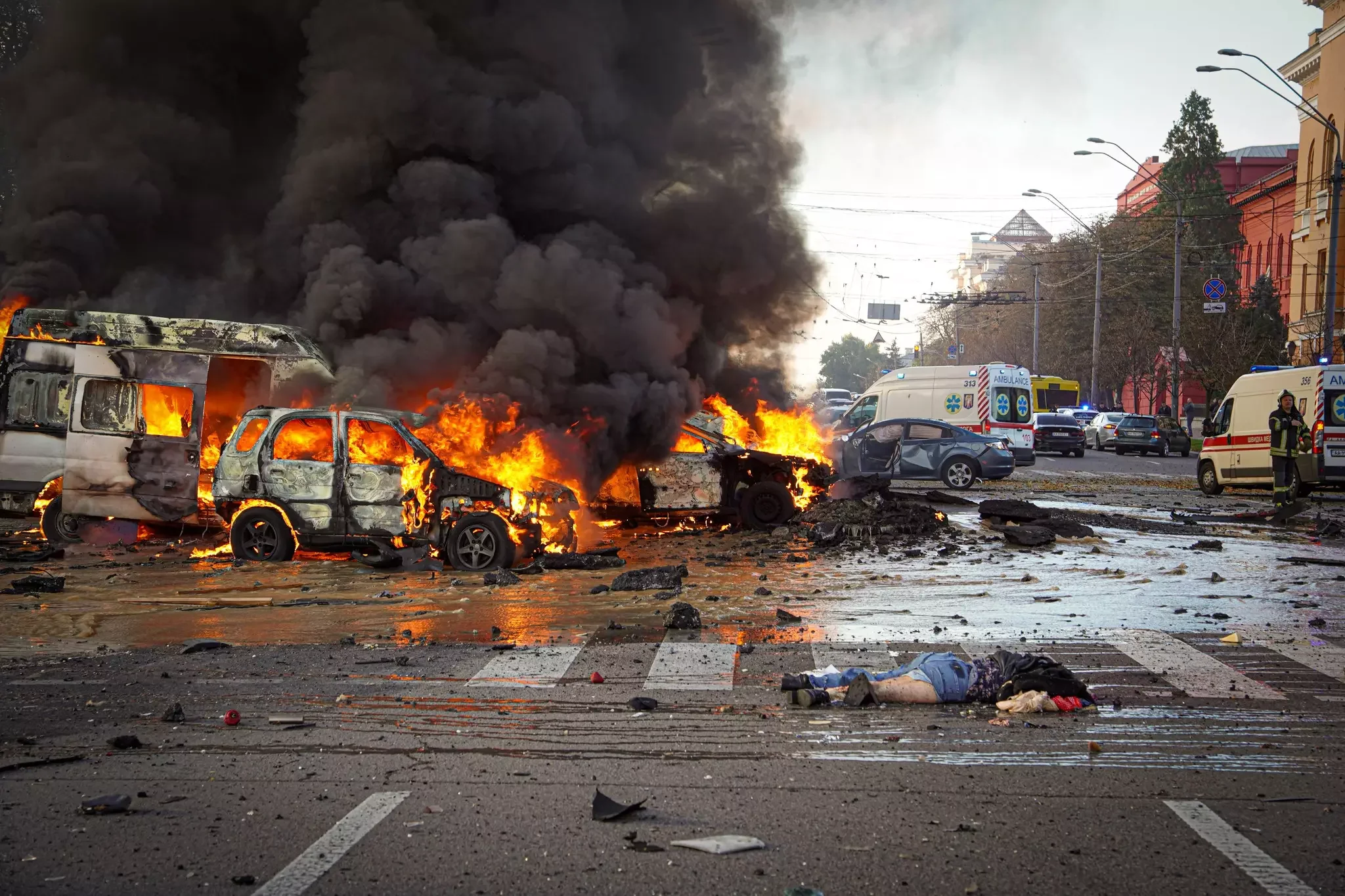
Streets of Kyiv following Russian rocket strikes on 10 October 2022. Ukraine has identified more than 600 suspected war criminals from Russia, including Shoigu.

On 12 October 2022, the independent Russian media project iStories reported that more than 90,000 Russian soldiers had been killed, seriously wounded or gone missing in Ukraine, citing sources close to the Kremlin.

On 23 October 2022, Shoigu said, without providing evidence, that Ukraine could escalate the war with a dirty bomb—or an explosive that contains radioactive waste material. The UK, US and French governments rejected what they called "Russia's transparently false allegations" against Ukraine, adding: "The world would see through any attempt to use this allegation as a pretext for escalation."

On 1 November 2022, Shoigu admitted that the Russian military was destroying Ukrainian energy facilities. On 6 December 2022, he said that Russian forces are "inflicting massive strikes" on Ukraine.

On 21 December 2022, Shoigu said that the war in Ukraine would continue in 2023 "until the tasks are completed". He declared that victory was "inevitable" and claimed that Russian troops were fighting what he called "neo-Nazism and terrorism".

On 18 April 2023, Shoigu met with Chinese Defence Minister Li Shangfu in Moscow. Shoigu said that their countries' military cooperation was a "stabilising" force in the world. They discussed expanding military cooperation.

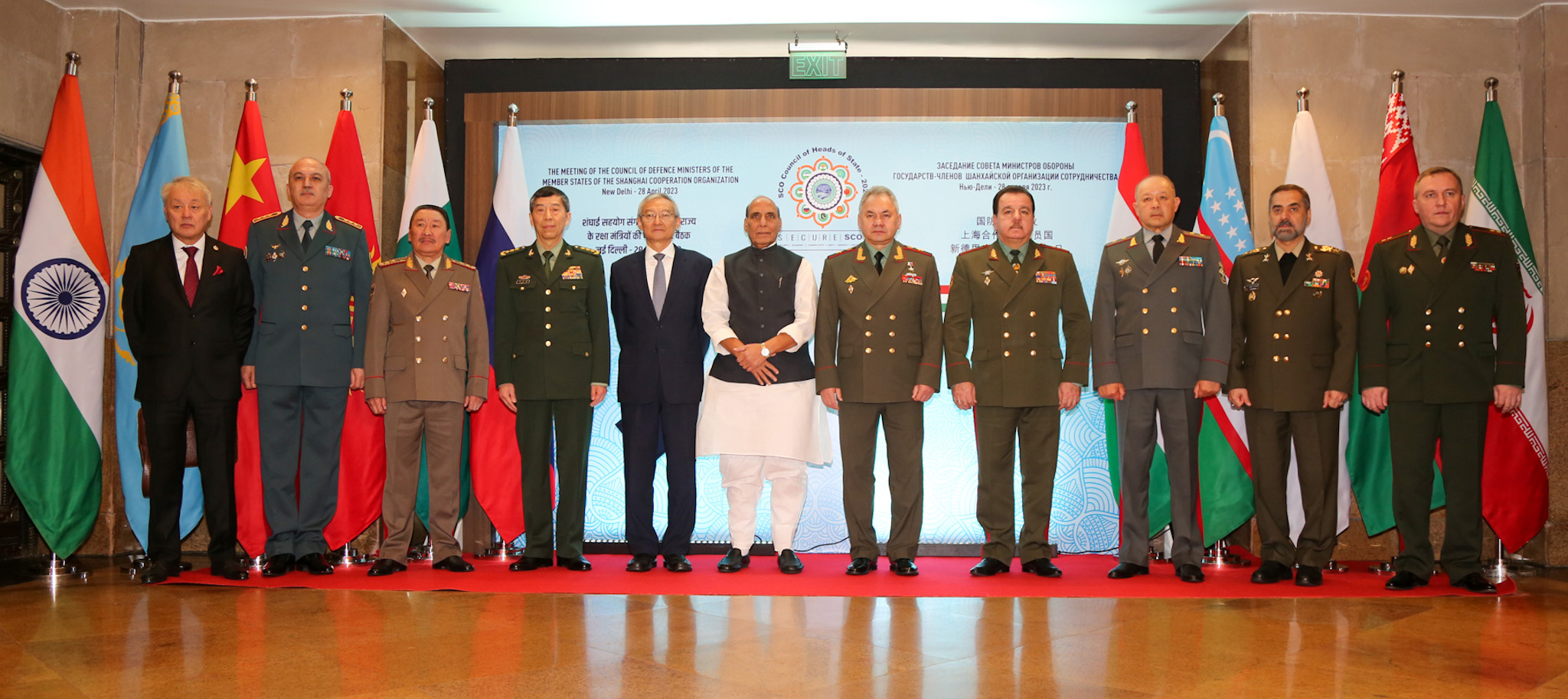
Shoigu at the SCO defence ministers' meeting in New Delhi, India, 28 April 2023

On 28 April 2023, he met with Indian Minister of Defence Rajnath Singh as part of the Shanghai Cooperation Organisation defence ministers' meeting in New Delhi, India.

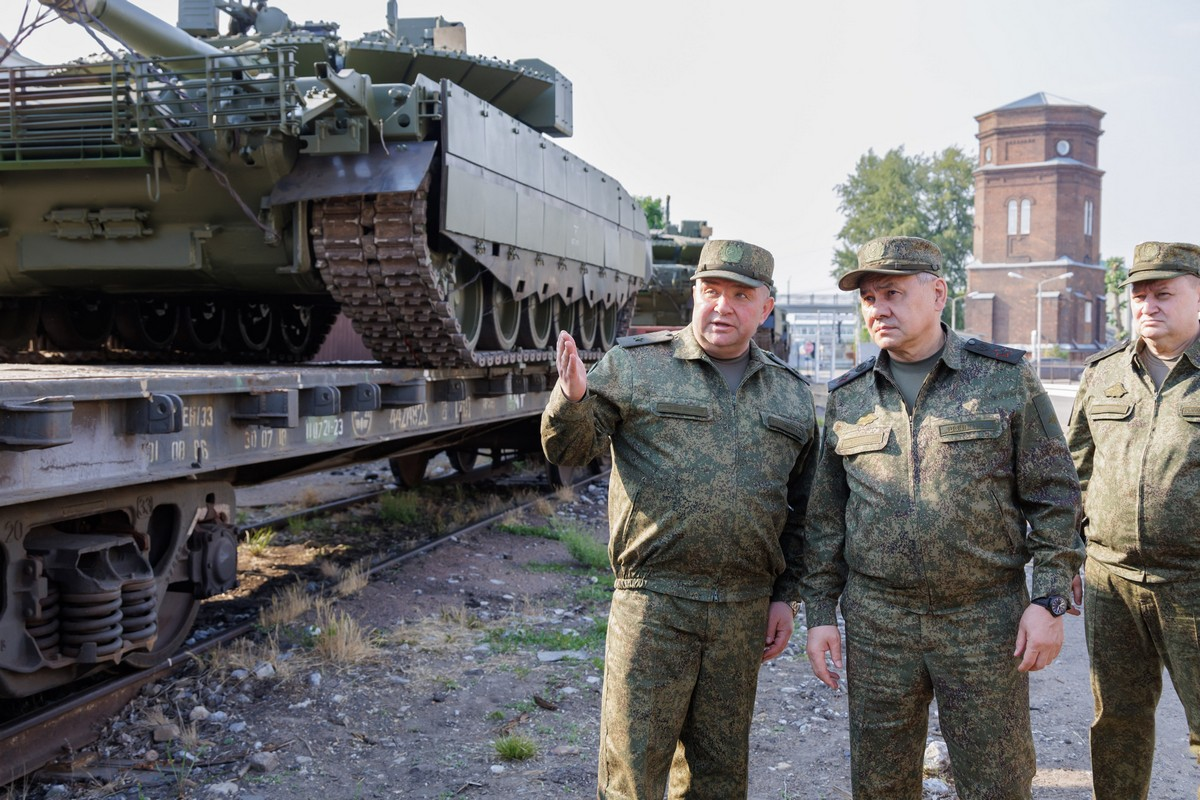
Shoigu inspects T-90M tanks ready for combat in Ukraine, June 2023.

On 6 June 2023, Shoigu said that Ukrainian "offensive attempts were thwarted, the enemy was stopped, Russian soldiers and officers showed courage and heroism in the battles", while claiming Ukraine had suffered "significant and incomparable casualties". On 20 June 2023, Shoigu stated that the Ukrainian counteroffensive began on June 4, and since then Ukraine had launched 263 attacks on Russian positions, all of which have been unsuccessful, and that Russian forces had lost no territory or settlements. The statement, which is directly contradictory to publicly available information, has been assessed by the ISW as "even-keeled" and an adaption to Russian command strategy following the chaos in the Russian information space during the Kharkiv and Kherson counteroffensives of 2022.

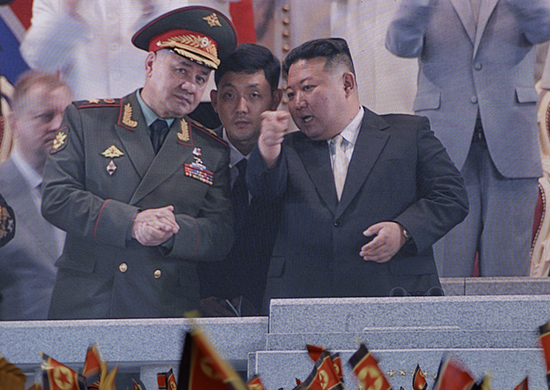
Shoigu with North Korean leader Kim Jong Un in Pyongyang, North Korea, 27 July 2023

In July 2023, the UK Ministry of Defense reported that Russia had suffered an average of around 400 casualties per day for 17 months. As of July 2023, the Russian Ministry of Defense was still keeping secret the actual number of casualties.

In July 2023, Shoigu and a Chinese delegation led by Communist Party Politburo member Li Hongzhong arrived in North Korea for the 70th anniversary of the end of the Korean War. He met with North Korean leader Kim Jong-un and North Korean Defense Minister Kang Sun-nam.

On 23 April 2024, Shoigu’s deputy Timur Ivanov was arrested for taking bribes.

=== Falling out with Wagner ===
On 5 May 2023, Wagner chief Yevgeny Prigozhin blamed Shoigu and Valery Gerasimov for "tens of thousands" of Wagner casualties, saying "Shoigu, Gerasimov, where ... is the ammunition? They came here as volunteers and are dying so you can sit like fat cats in your luxury offices."

In a video released on 23 June 2023 at the start of the Wagner Group rebellion, Prigozhin said that Russian government justifications for the Russian invasion of Ukraine were based on lies. He accused the Russian Defense Ministry under Shoigu of "trying to deceive society and the president and tell us how there was crazy aggression from Ukraine and that they were planning to attack us with the whole of NATO". According to Prigozhin, "Shoigu killed thousands of the most combat-ready Russian soldiers in the first days of the war. The mentally ill scumbags decided 'It's okay, we'll throw in a few thousand more Russian men as 'cannon fodder'. 'They'll die under artillery fire, but we'll get what we want'."

Despite being the target of Prigozhin's ire, Shoigu made no public appearances during the incident, leading Russian media to speculate that he had lost Putin's confidence and that his removal had been a condition of the agreement that ended the rebellion on 24 June. However, on 26 June, the Russian Ministry of Defence published a video allegedly showing Shoigu meeting Russian officers in Ukraine.

== Secretary of the Security Council ==
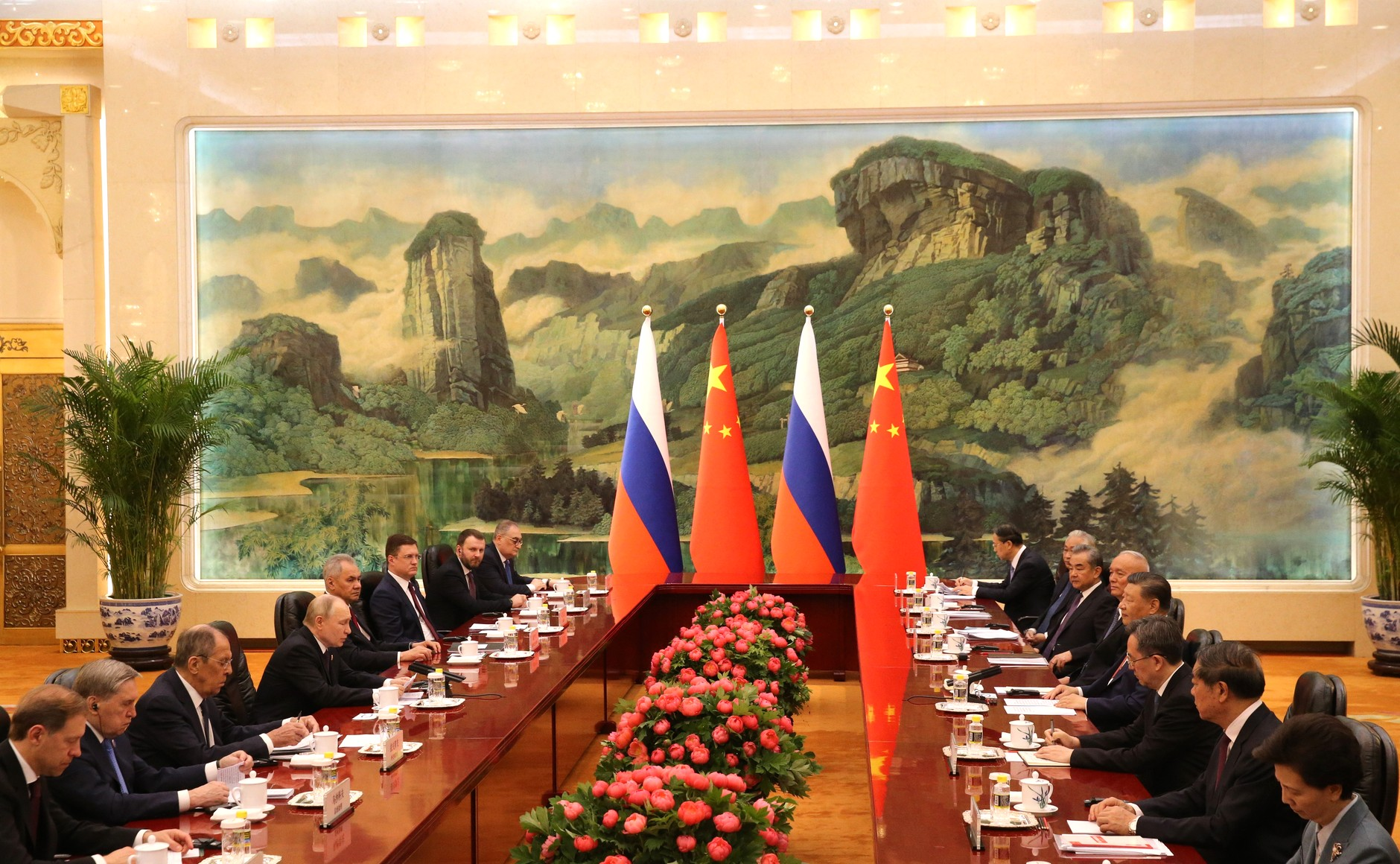
Shoigu in Beijing during Putin's visit to China on 16 May 2024

On 12 May 2024, soon after Putin's re-election, Shoigu replaced Nikolai Patrushev as Secretary of the Security Council of the Russian Federation. According to analysts, the replacement of Sergei Shoigu by Andrey Belousov as defense minister signals that Putin is preparing for a long war of attrition against Ukraine.

On 25 June 2024, the International Criminal Court issued an arrest warrant for Shoigu on charges of alleged war crimes for missile strikes against Ukrainian energy infrastructure.

On 5 August 2024 Shoigu visited Tehran for high-level meetings with the new Pezeshkian government, the General Staff of Iran and members of Iran's Supreme National Security Council.

On 4 and 17 June 2025, Shoigu visited Pyongyang to meet with Kim Jong-un, amid calls in Russian state media for increased North Korean military support in the war in Ukraine.

Shoigu met with Chinese Foreign Minister Wang Yi on 3 December 2025, where Russia announced its support for China amidst a diplomatic crisis with Japan. After the meeting, the two sides released a joint statement saying that they had "conducted strategic alignment on issues related to Japan, reaching a high degree of consensus" and "agreed to resolutely uphold the outcomes of World War II victory, firmly oppose any attempts to whitewash colonial aggression and resolutely counter any attempts to revive fascism or Japanese militarism". Shoigu added that "the hydra of militarism is once again raising its head" but that China and Russia "will not allow the revival of criminal regimes in Europe and Tokyo".

== Sanctions ==
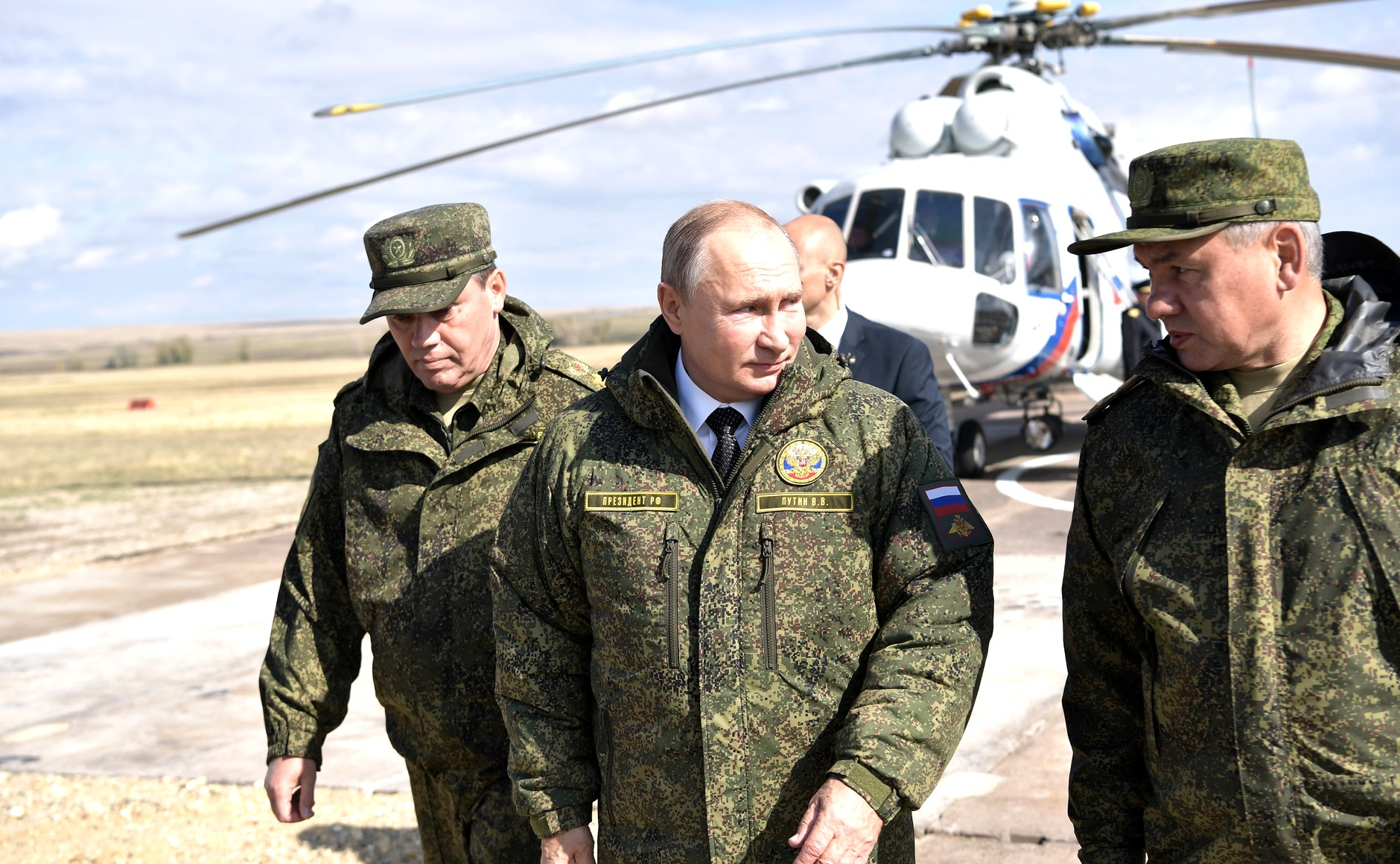
Sergei Shoigu, President of Russia Vladimir Putin and Chief of the General Staff Valery Gerasimov at the Center-2019 military exercises. Orenburg Oblast, 2019.

On 23 February 2022, the European Union considered Shoigu responsible for actively supporting and implementing actions and policies that undermine and threaten the territorial integrity, sovereignty and independence of Ukraine as well as the stability or security in Ukraine. Therefore the European Union added Shoigu to the list of natural and legal persons, entities and bodies set out in Annex I to Regulation (EU) No 269/2014.

On 25 February 2022, following Russia's invasion of Ukraine, the United States added Shoigu to the Specially Designated Nationals and Blocked Persons List.

Shoigu was sanctioned by the UK government in 2022 in relation to the Russo-Ukrainian War.

On 28 February 2022, the Government of Canada "further amended its Special Economic Measures (Russia) Regulations to add eighteen members of the Security Council of the Russian Federation responsible for" Russian actions in Ukraine, "including President Vladimir Putin, Foreign Minister Sergei Lavrov, Minister of Defence Sergei Shoigu, Minister of Justice Konstantin Chuychenko, and Finance Minister Anton Siluanov".

== Personal life ==
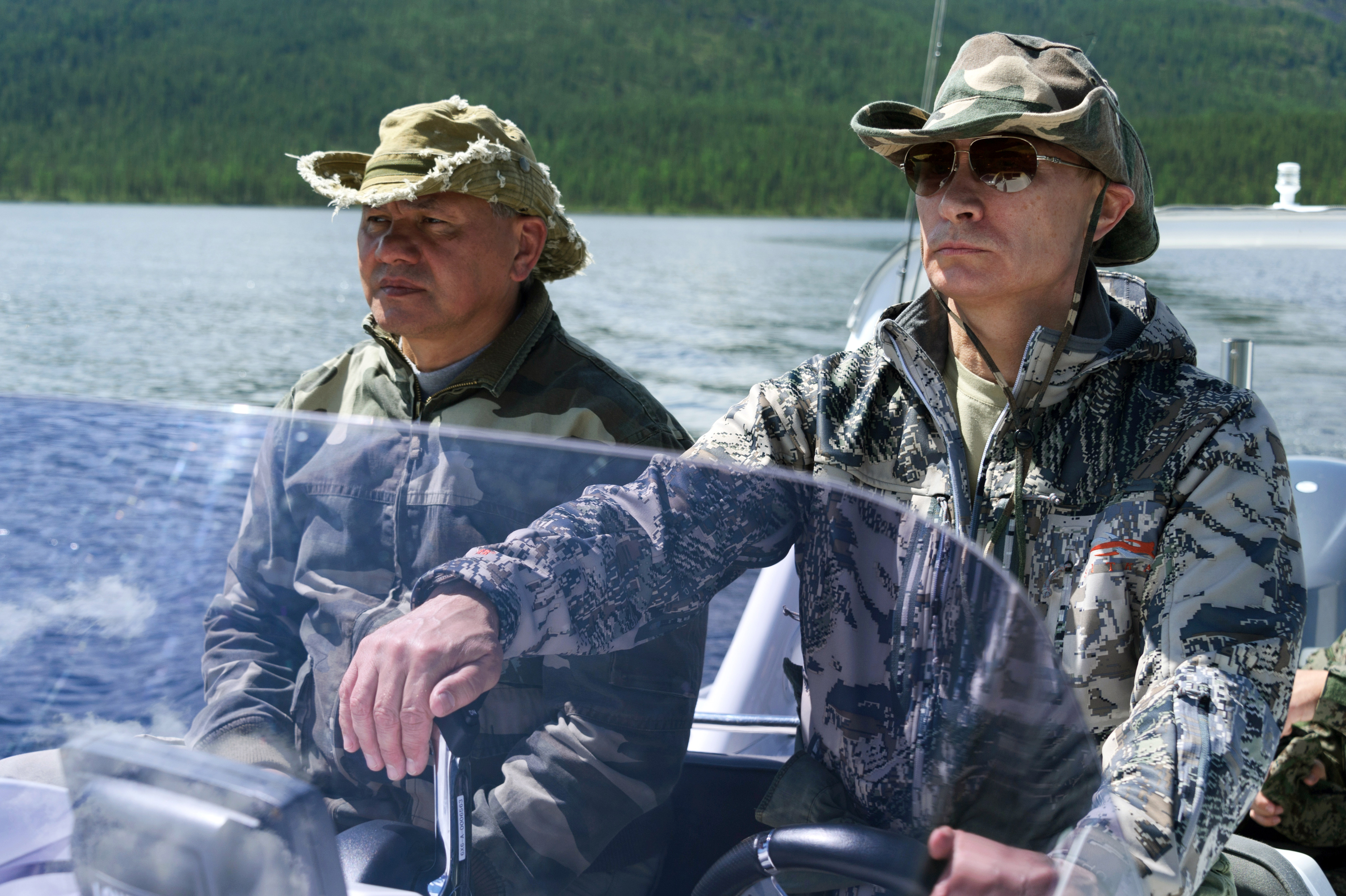
Shoigu and Putin during their vacation in Tuva on 20 July 2013

According to The Siberian Times, Shoigu is a polyglot who is known to speak eight languages other than Russian fluently, including English, Japanese, Chinese, Tuvan, and Turkish.

=== Family ===
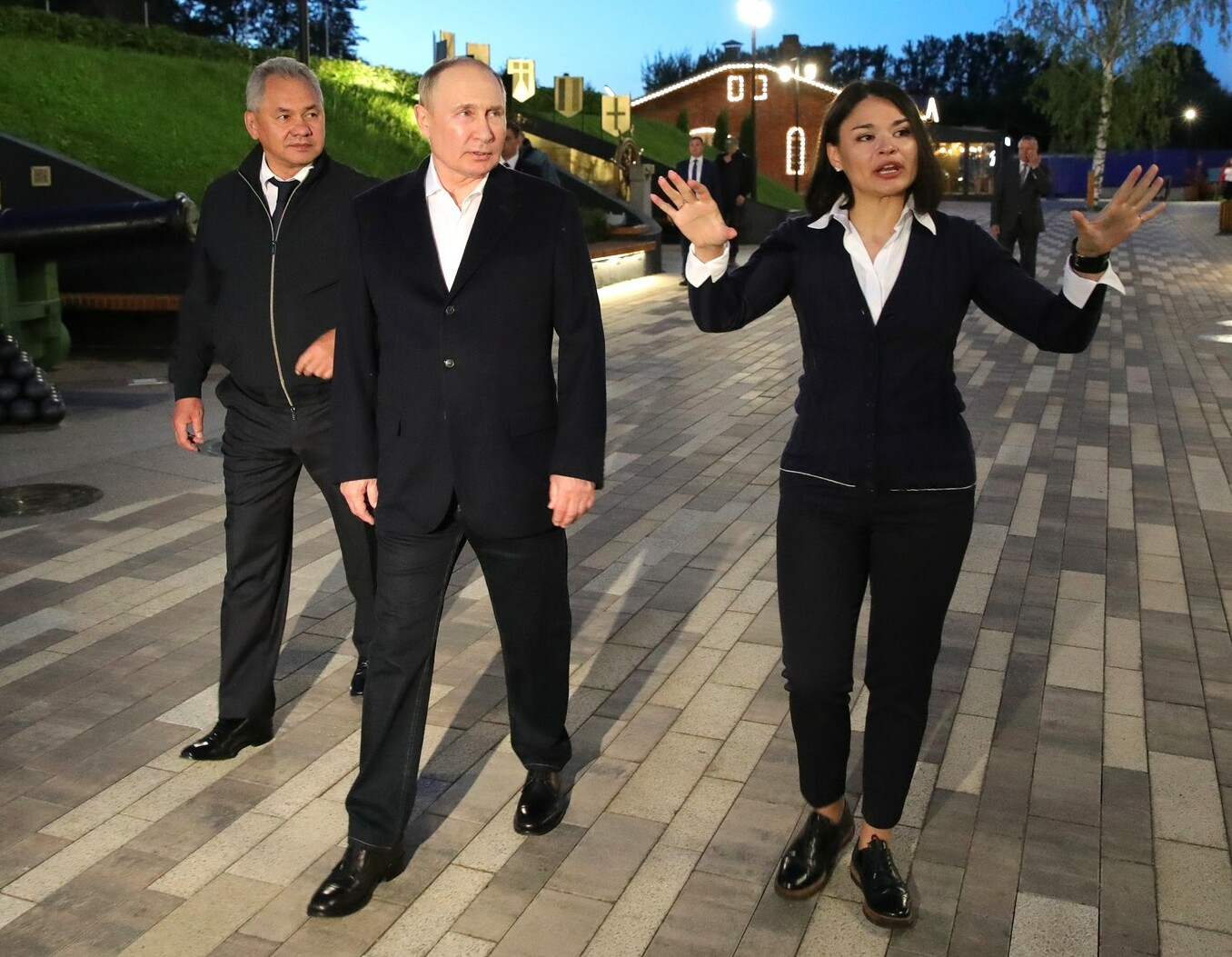
Shoigu with his daughter Kseniya Shoygu and Vladimir Putin on 30 July 2022

Sergei Shoigu was born to Kuzhuget Sereevich Shoigu (1921–2010) and Alexandra Yakovlevna Shoigu (née Kudryavtseva, 1924–2011). His father was born Shoigu Seree oglu Kuzhuget. His name order was changed because of a passport error, according to the Tuva official line. More likely, he Russified the name from Turkic oglu 'son of...'. Kuzhuget was an editor of a regional newspaper. He later worked in the Communist Party and for the Soviet authorities. He was the secretary of the Tuva Party Committee. He retired with the rank of first deputy chairman of the Council of Ministers of the Tuva ASSR.

Shoigu's father led the Tuvan State Archives. He spent six years as the editor of the newspaper Pravda. He wrote the novels Time and People, Feather of the Black Vulture (2001), Tannu Tuva: the Country of Lakes and Blue Rivers (2004).

Shoigu's mother Alexandra was born in the village of Yakovlev in the Oryol Oblast. From there, shortly before the Great Patriotic War, her family moved to Kadiivka in the Luhansk Oblast, Ukraine. A zootechnician, Alexandra was an Honored Worker of Agriculture of the Republic of Tuva. From 1979 she was the head of the Planning Department of the Ministry of Agriculture of the Republic. She was repeatedly elected deputy of the Supreme Soviet (parliament) of the Tuva ASSR. Sergei's great uncle, Seren Kuzhuget, was the commander of the Tuvan People's Revolutionary Army from 1929 to 1938.

Sergei has two sisters: Larisa Kuzhugetovna Shoigu (1953–2021), who was a deputy of the State Duma; and Irina Zakharova (born 1960), a psychiatrist.

Shoigu married Irina Alexandrovna Shoigu (née Antipina). She is president of the business tourism company Expo-EM. They have two daughters, Yulia (1977) and Kseniya (1991). According to Alexei Navalny, Kseniya is suspected to be a figurehead of her father in the ownership of a palace in the outskirts of Moscow, valued at about £12 million. In 2012, the estate was transferred to the formal ownership of Yelena Antipina. Following the Russian invasion of Ukraine, Kseniya posted a video on social media of her daughter and herself wearing the colours of the Ukrainian flag. According to the US Department of the Treasury, Kseniya Shoigu "made tens of millions of dollars on state construction projects and has business interests directly tied to the Ministry of Defence". In May 2023, Wagner chief Yevgeny Prigozhin condemned the luxurious lifestyle of the children of Russia's top officials and in particular singled out Shoigu's son-in-law Alexey Stolyarov for not joining the Russian army. In August 2023, it was announced that Shoigu's daughter and her husband Stolyarov had separated, allegedly at the instigation of Shoigu and Putin.

Shoigu is alleged to have an affair with Elena Shebunova from the early 2000s until 2017. According to similar sources, allegedly Shoigu and Shebunova have three children: Danila (2001), Dasha (2008), and Stepan (2011). Danila is pursuing a music career under the stage-name Sheba (or Sheba Singer).

=== Hobbies ===
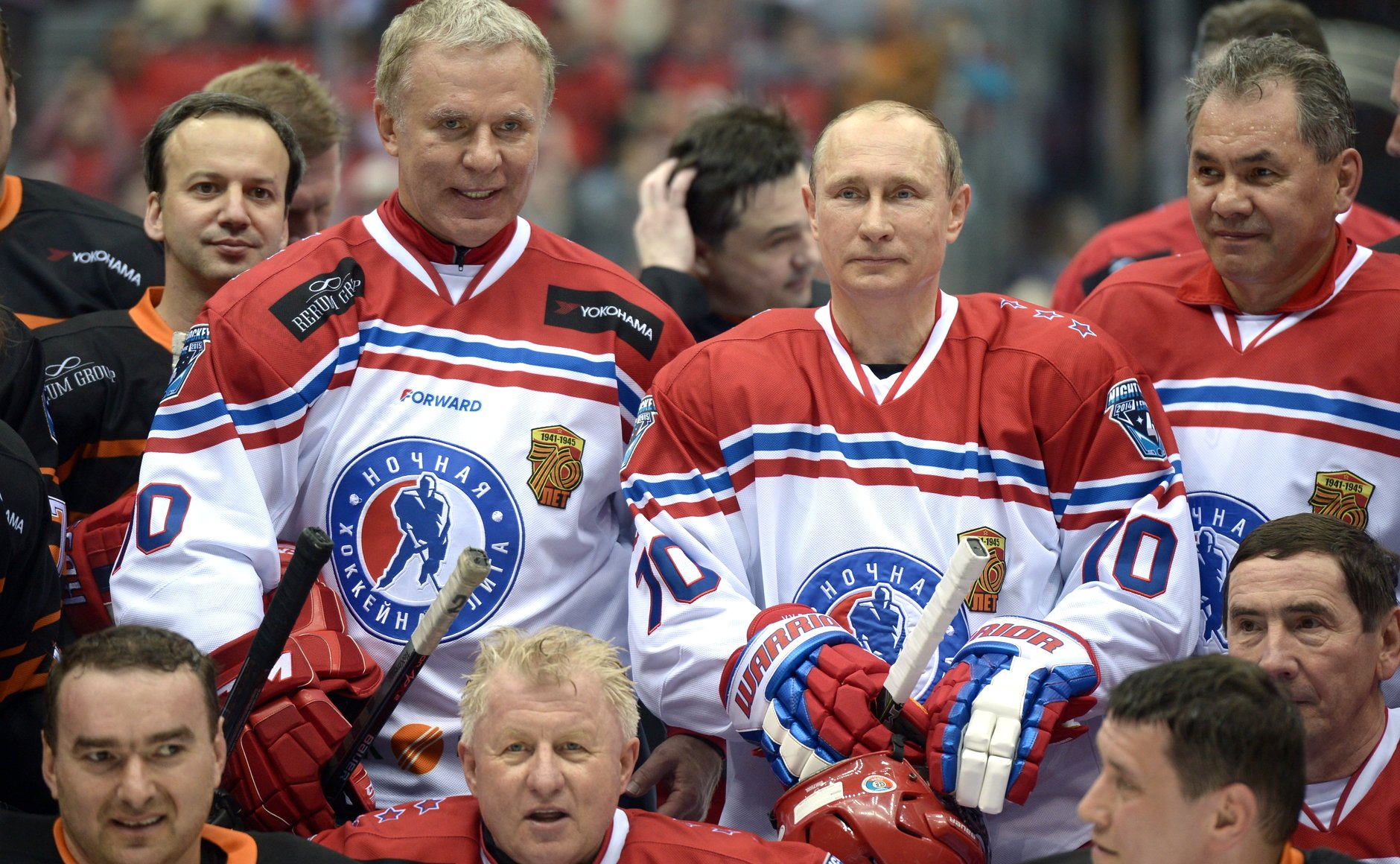
Shoigu, Putin and Arkady Dvorkovich on 16 May 2015

Shoigu enjoys studying the history of Russia, especially Peter the Great's time and the era between 1812 and 1825 (which includes the French invasion of Russia and the Decembrist revolt).

Shoigu collects Indian, Chinese, and Japanese swords and daggers. He enjoys bard songs and plays the guitar. He does water color paintings and graphics. He enjoys carpentry, and has shown some of his work to Putin.

=== Religion ===
Shoigu stated in 2008 that he was baptized in the Russian Orthodox Church at the age of five, rebutting rumors that he was a practitioner of shamanism or Buddhism like many Tuvans.

In 2023, the largest 12-story Buddhist monastery in Russia, Thubten Shedrub Ling, opened in Kyzyl, built on the initiative of Sergei Shoigu with financial support from the foundation named after him.

== Honours ==
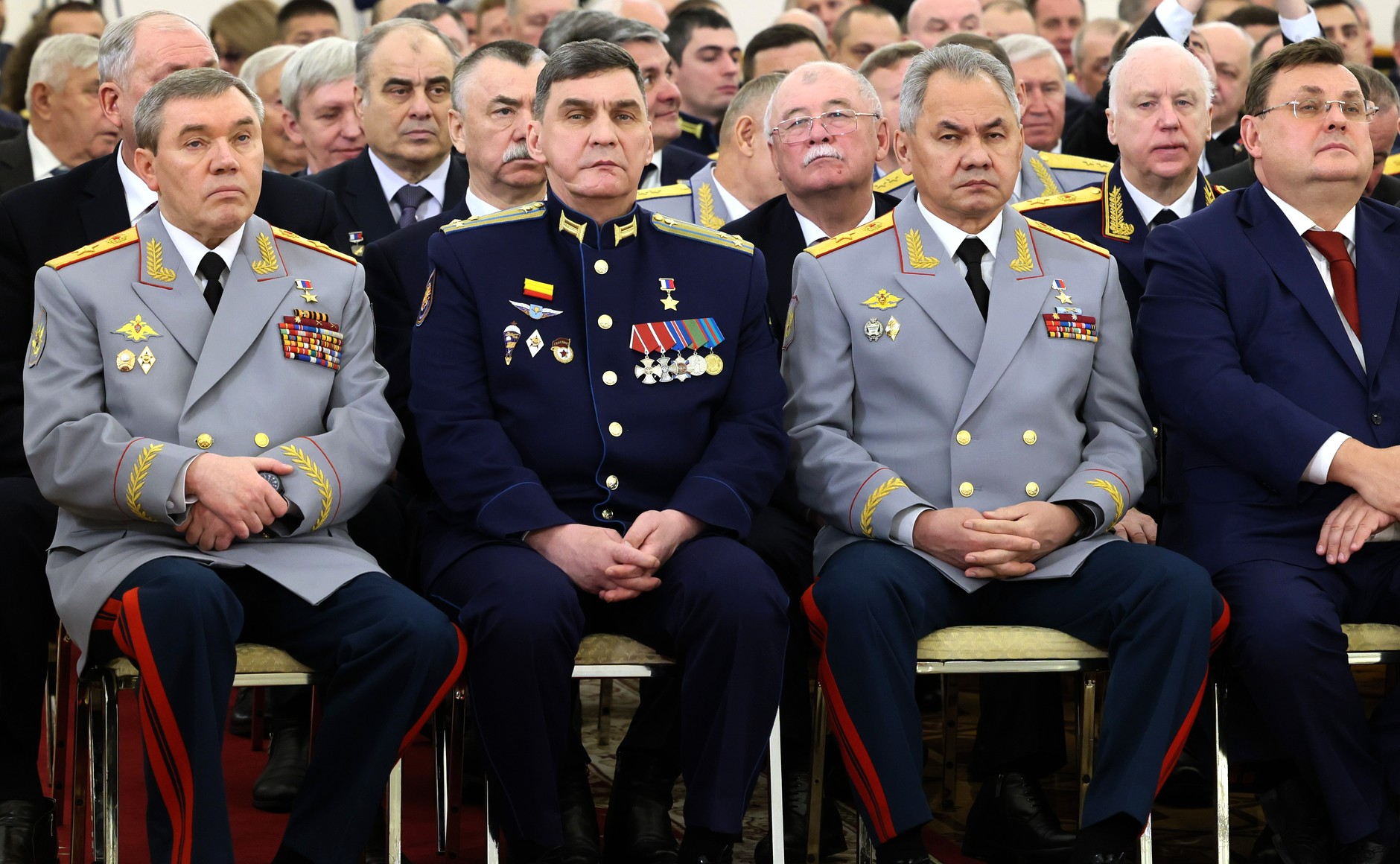
Shoigu, Alexander Bastrykin, Valery Gerasimov and other prominent figures of the Putin regime at the award ceremony on 8 December 2022

=== Russian ===
- Hero of the Russian Federation
- Order of St Andrew with swords
- Order of Merit for the Fatherland 1st class
- Order of Merit for the Fatherland 2nd class
- Order of Merit for the Fatherland 3rd class
- Order of Alexander Nevsky
- Order of Honour
- Order for Personal Courage (USSR)
- Medal "For the Return of Crimea"
- Medal Defender of a Free Russia
- Medal "In Commemoration of the 850th Anniversary of Moscow"
- Medal "In Commemoration of the 300th Anniversary of Saint Petersburg"
- Medal "In Commemoration of the 1000th Anniversary of Kazan"
- Three Medals "For Strengthening Military Cooperation" (Ministry of Defence)
- Medal "For Diligence in Engineering Tasks" (Ministry of Defence)
- Medal "200 Years of the Ministry of Defence" (Ministry of Defence)
- Medal of Great Awareness in Geo-political Affairs (Foreign Ministry)
- Medal "200 Years of the Ministry of Internal Affairs" (MVD)
- Medal "For Merit of the Stavropol Territory"
- Honoured Rescue Worker of the Russian Federation
- Order of Rightitude (Ministry of Internal Affairs – for services to being correct on the territory of the Russian Federation)
- Order of "Merit of the Altai Territory"
- Honorary Citizen of Kemerovo Oblast
- Honorary Citizen of Tula Oblast

=== Foreign ===
- Medal of the Order of Courage (Abkhazia)
- First Class of the Order of Friendship (Kazakhstan)
- Medal of the Order "Danaker" (Kyrgyzstan)
- Military Class of the Order pro Merito Melitensi
- Medal of the Order of the Red Banner (Mongolia)
- Grand Commander of the Order of the Union of Burma (Myanmar) Sithu class
- Grand Cross with silver star of the Order of Ruben Dario (Nicaragua)
- First Class of the Order of the Serbian Flag (Serbia)
- Medal of the Uatsamonga Order (South Ossetia)
- Military Commonwealth Medal (Syria)
- Medal of the Friendship Order (Vietnam)

== See also ==
- List of Heroes of the Russian Federation

== Notes ==
Political offices
Preceded by Position established	Minister of Emergency Situations; 1991–2012	Succeeded by Vladimir Puchkov
Preceded by Boris Gromov	Governor of Moscow Oblast; 2012	Succeeded by Andrey Vorobyov acting
Preceded by Anatoliy Serdyukov	Minister of Defence; 2012–2024	Succeeded by Andrey Belousov
Party political offices
New office	Leader of United Russia; 2001–2005	Succeeded by Boris Gryzlov
