= Larisa Shoigu =

Russian politician (1953–2021)

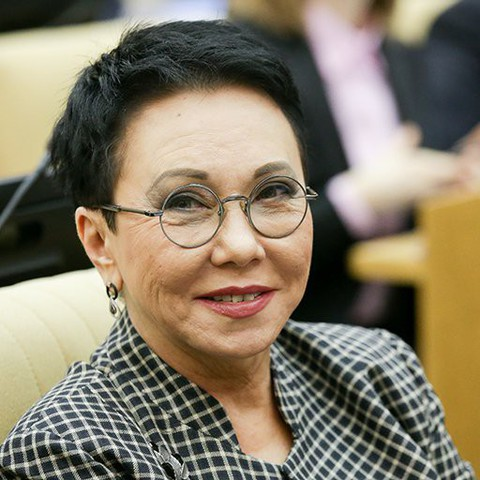

Member of the State Duma
- In office 1 December 2007 – 10 June 2021
- Preceded by: Chylgychy Ondar

Personal details
- Born: 21 January 1953 Chadan, Tuvan Autonomous Oblast, Russian SFSR, Soviet Union
- Died: 10 June 2021 (aged 68) Moscow, Russia
- Party: United Russia
- Spouse: Konstantin Flamenbaum (died 2017)
- Children: 1
- Parents: Kuzhuget Shoigu (father); Alexandra Kudryavtseva (mother)
- Relatives: Sergei Shoigu (brother); Yulia Shoigu (niece)
- Education: Tomsk Medical Institute
- Profession: Politician, physician, psychiatrist, reflexologist
- Awards: Order of Friendship; Honoured Doctor of Russia

Larisa Kuzhugetovna Shoigu (Russian: Лариса Кужугетовна Шойгу; 21 January 1953 – 10 June 2021) was a Russian politician. She served as a Deputy of the State Duma for its 5th, 6th and 7th convocations, between 2007 and 2021.

Born into a family involved in regional politics, Larisa Shoigu initially chose a career in medicine, as did her younger sister. Her brother, Sergei Shoigu, went into the military, eventually rising to the position of Russian Defence Minister. After studying at Tomsk Medical Institute, Larisa Shoigu graduated in 1977 and spent the next 22 years at Tuva Psychiatric Hospital, initially as a psychiatrist, and rising to the position of deputy chief physician for medical work. She moved to Moscow in 1998, working at the central polyclinic of the Ministry of Emergency Situations, before entering politics in 2007 with her election to the State Duma for its 5th convocation that year.

She was a member of United Russia, representing them in the Duma over the next fourteen years. She was re-elected in 2011 and again in 2016. During her time as deputy, she was a member of the State Duma Committee on Health Protection, and deputy chairman of the Duma committee on the Rules and Organization. She remained a Duma deputy until her death on 10 June 2021, at the age of 68.

== Early life and family ==
Shoigu was born on 21 January 1953 in Chadan, Tuvan Autonomous Oblast, then part of the Russian Soviet Federal Socialist Republic, in the Soviet Union. Her father, Kuzhuget Shoigu, was secretary of the Tuva regional committee of the Communist Party of the Soviet Union and deputy chairman of the Council of Ministers of the Tuvan Autonomous Soviet Socialist Republic. Her mother, Alexandra Yakovlevna Shoigu (née Kudryavtseva), was Kuzhuget's second wife. She was a zootechnician, economist and several times deputy of the Tuva Regional Council of People's Deputies. Her younger brother, Sergei Shoigu, joined the military, and in 2012 became Russian Defence Minister. Her younger sister, Irina Kuzhugetovna Zakharova (née Shoigu) was born in 1960, and became a psychiatrist.

== Education and early career ==
Larisa Shoigu studied at school No.1 in Kyzyl, and with her brother Sergei was also in a theatre group led by future People's Artist of Russia Nadezhda Krasnaya. She studied for a time at the Novosibirsk correspondence mathematical school, but then enrolled in Tomsk Medical Institute in 1970, where she met her future husband, the surgeon Konstantin Yakubovich Flamenbaum, before graduating in 1977. In 1982, she completed a residency at the N.I. Pirogov 2nd Moscow State Medical Institute. From 1976 until 1998, she worked at the Tuva Psychiatric Hospital, initially as a psychiatrist, rising to the position of deputy chief physician for medical work. In 1998, she became First Deputy Minister of Health of the Republic of Tuva. She was also a forensic psychiatrist, and chairman of the forensic psychiatric commission. For her work she received the title of Honoured Doctor of Russia.

== Moscow medicine and politics ==
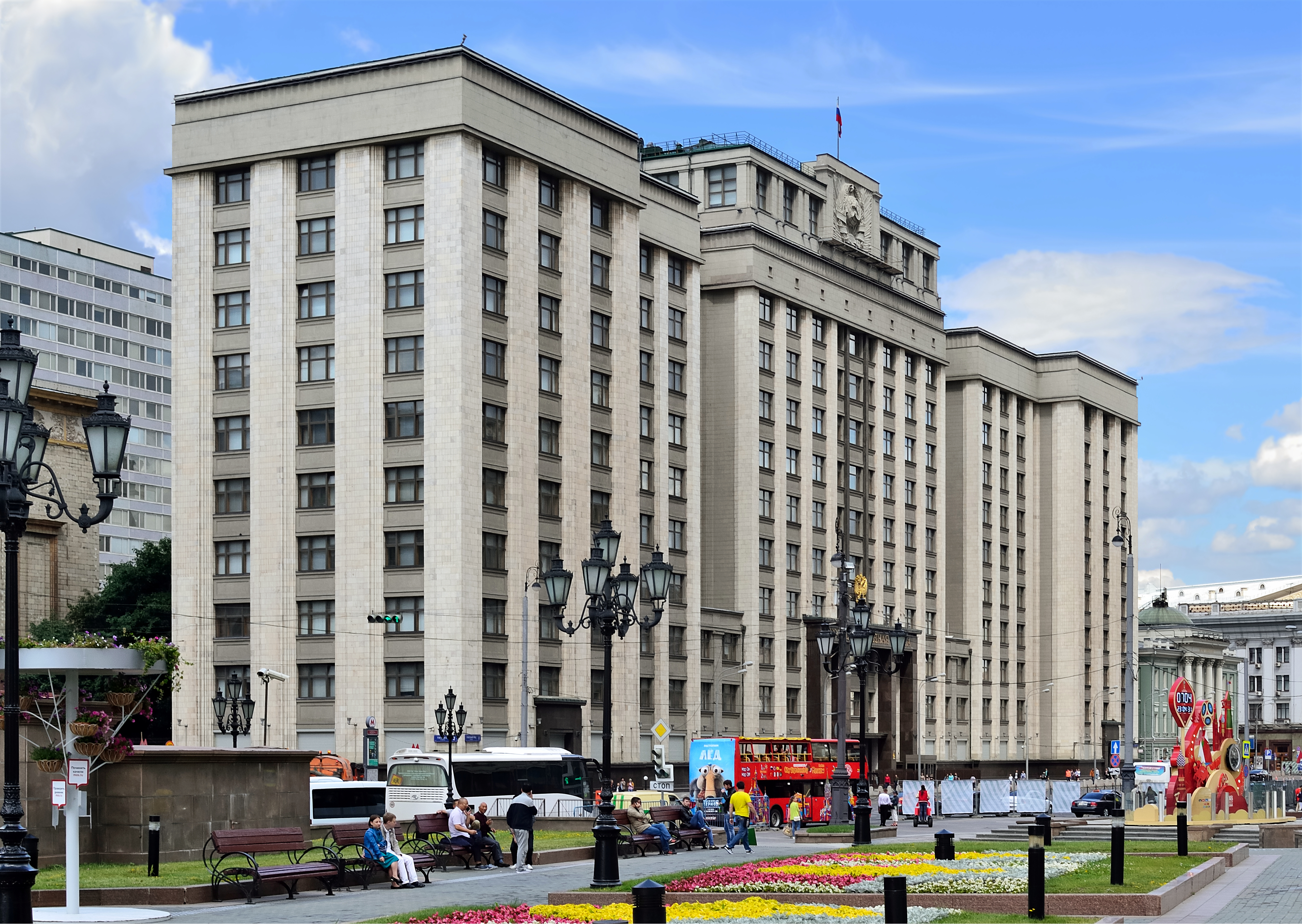
The building of the State Duma, Moscow. Shoigu was a deputy from 2007 until her death in 2021.

Shoigu moved to Moscow in late 1998, becoming employed at the central polyclinic of the Ministry of Emergency Situations, as a reflexologist in 1999. From 2000 until 2007 she was deputy head of the polyclinic of the Ministry of Emergency Situations for insurance medicine. She joined the United Russia party in 2005, and in 2007, just prior to entering politics, she changed her surname from her husband's, Flamenbaum, back to her maiden name. On 2 December 2007, in the Russian legislative election that year, she was elected a deputy of the State Duma for its fifth convocation, on the list of candidates nominated by the United Russia party. She became a member of the State Duma Committee on Health Protection. She was also a member of the audit commission of the Por-Bazhyn foundation, and paid for the publication of the book Mysterious Tuva by Sevian Weinstein. On 4 December 2011, in the Russian legislative election that year, she was elected a deputy of the State Duma for its sixth convocation, again on the list of candidates nominated by the United Russia party. She served as the deputy chairman of the Duma committee on the Rules and Organization of the State Duma, and was a member of United Russia's General Council.

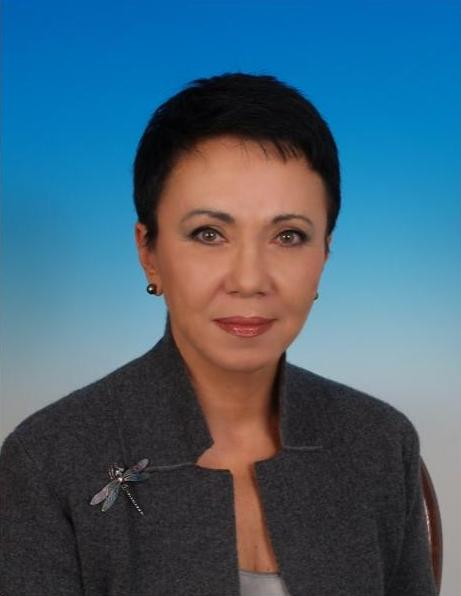
Shoigu in 2012

She began her third term as deputy for the Duma's 7th convocation on 18 September 2016, as part of United Russia. She was deputy chairwoman of the Control and Regulations Committee. In May 2021, having secured 39,000 of the 42,000 votes, she became the top vote-getter in the United Russia primaries to stand for Tuva in the federal legislative election scheduled for September. Her last appearance in the Duma was on 9 June 2021. During her time in office from 2007 until 2021, she co-authored 17 legislative initiatives and amendments in the drafting of federal laws.

== Personal life ==
Her husband died in 2017. Their son, Aleksandr Konstantinovich Flamenbaum, was born in 1975, becoming a lawyer, and CEO of a financial and investment company. Aleksandr married and has two children.

== Death ==
Shoigu died on 10 June 2021, at the age of 68. Her cause of death was a stroke as an apparent complication of a COVID-19 infection. Her death was announced by Sergey Neverov, leader of United Russia in the Duma, who said that "her departure was a great loss for everyone." Prime Minister of Russia Mikhail Mishustin expressed his condolences, stating that she was "a bright politician, talented and warm-hearted person."

The Head of the Republic of Tuva, Vladislav Khovalyg, issued an ukaz declaring 11 June a day of mourning in the republic. She was buried in the Troyekurovskoye Cemetery on 12 June in a ceremony attended by many of her colleagues, including Chairman of the State Duma Vyacheslav Volodin.
