= Yulia Shoigu =

Russian psychologist (born 1977)

- Юлия Шойгу
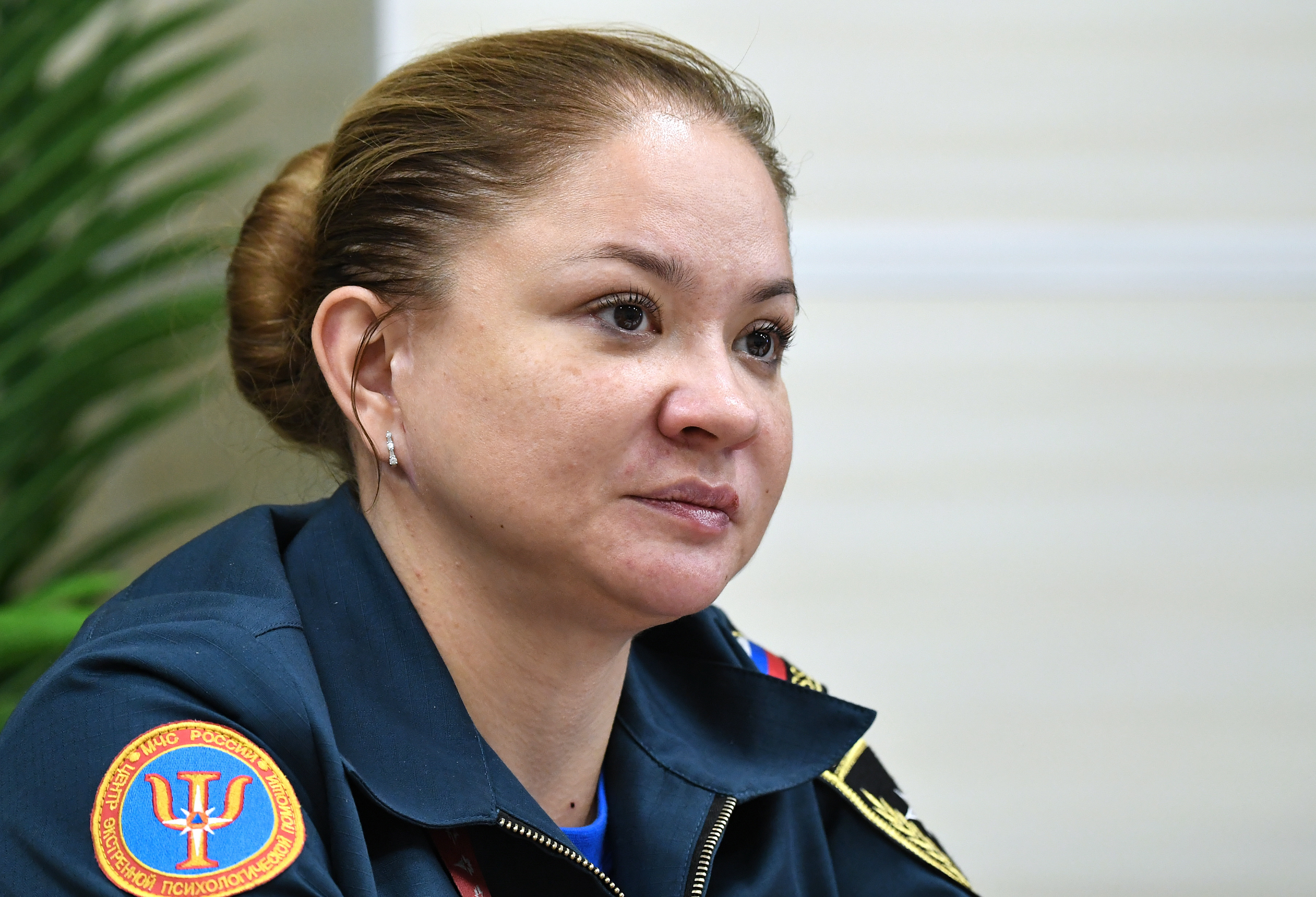
- Born: Yulia Sergeevna Shoigu; 4 May 1977 (age 49); Krasnoyarsk, Russian SFSR, Soviet Union
- Education: Moscow State University
- Spouse: Alexey Zakharov
- Children: Daria, Kirill
- Parents: Sergei Shoigu (father); Irina Shoigu (mother)
- Relatives: Larisa Shoigu (aunt); Kseniya Shoigu (sister)
- Awards: (with swords)
- Scientific career
- Fields: Psychology of extreme situations
- Workplaces: The Center of Emergency Psychological Aid of the EMERCOM

Yulia Sergeevna Shoigu (Russian: Юлия Сергеевна Шойгу́; born 4 May 1977) is a Russian psychologist who is the current director of the Center of Emergency Psychological Aid of the Ministry of Emergency Situations. She was appointed in 2002 and is concurrently the vice-president of the Russian Psychological Society. She is the eldest daughter of Sergei Shoigu.

== Early life and education ==
Shoigu was born on 4 May 1977 in the city of Krasnoyarsk to Irina Shoigu and Sergei Shoigu, who was studying at the Krasnoyarsk Polytechnic Institute with a major in civil engineering at that time. She has a sister named Kseniya Shoigu. Due to the nature of the work of her father, the family often changed residence. Yulia graduated from a secondary school in Moscow in 1994, and was admitted to the Faculty of Psychology of Moscow State University.

== Career ==
In 1999, after graduating from university she came to work in the Center for Emergency and Psychological Aid of the EMERCOM and started to work as a psychologist. In 2001, Shoigu was appointed deputy director, and a year later the director of the center. At various times, Shoigu participated in the provision of psychological assistance to the victims of the terrorist attacks, hostage-taking, after man-made disasters in Moscow, 1995 Neftegorsk earthquake, S7 Airlines Flight 778, Kursk submarine disaster and other emergency situations in Russia and abroad. She gained her PhD as the author of scientific works on the psychology of extreme situations; her PhD thesis was named "Professional psychological selection of cadets of universities of the Ministry of Emergency Situations of Russia - future rescuers" and defended in 2003.

== Personal life ==
Yulia Shoigu is married to the Deputy Prosecutor General of Russia Alexey Zakharov, and has two children, a daughter named Daria, and a son named Kirill.

== Sanctions ==
In response to the Russian invasion of Ukraine, the Office of Foreign Assets Control of the United States Department of the Treasury added Shoigu to the Specially Designated Nationals and Blocked Persons List on 30 September 2022, which results in her assets being frozen and U.S. persons being prohibited from dealing with her. She was also sanctioned by Japan on 7 October 2022.

== Awards ==
She has been awarded with various state and departmental awards:

- Medal of the Order For Merit to the Fatherland 1st class
- Medal of the Order For Merit to the Fatherland 2nd class
- Medal "For Life Saving" (2019)
