= Kuzhuget Shoigu =

Soviet Tuvan politician, journalist and writer (1921–2010)

- Күжүгет Шойгу
- Born: Shoygu Seree oglu Küzhüget; 24 September 1921; Kara-Khol, Tuvan People's Republic (now Republic of Tuva, Russia)
- Died: 1 December 2010 (aged 89); Moscow, Russia
- Political party: Communist Party of the Soviet Union
- Spouse: Aleksandra Kudryavtseva (m. 1952)
- Children: 4, including Larisa and Sergei
- Relatives: Kalin-ool Sergeyevich Kuzhuget (brother)
- Honours: Order of the Republic of Tuva; Medal "For Valorous Labour"

Kuzhuget Sereyevich Shoigu (Note: Tuvan: Күжүгет Серээ оглу Шойгу, romanized: Küjüget Serê oglu Şoygu; Russian: Кужуге́т Сереевич Шойгу́) (born Shoigu Sereyevich Kuzhuget; (Note: Tuvan: Шойгу Серээ оглу Күжүгет, romanized: Şoygu Serê oglu Küjüget; Russian: Шойгу́ Сереевич Кужуге́т) 24 September 1921 – 1 December 2010), was a Soviet Tuvan politician, journalist, and writer who served as a secretary of the Tuvan Regional Committee of the Communist Party of the Soviet Union, first Deputy Chairman of the Council of Ministers of the Tuvan Autonomous Soviet Socialist Republic, and a deputy of the Supreme Soviet of the Tuvan ASSR. He was also the father of Sergei Shoigu and Larisa Shoigu.

== Biography ==
Shoygu Seree oglu Küzhüget was born on 24 September 1921 in the village of Kara-Khol, in the recently established Tuvan People's Republic, to a family of nomadic herders. Following the annexation of Tuva into the Soviet Union, Shoigu's name and surname would later be reversed on a whim of the official who issued the passport, due to the large size of the Küzhüget family; this change was not performed on other members of the Küzhüget family, such as Shoigu's brother Kalin-ool Kuzhuget.

During his early life, Shoigu spent much time herding cattle with his family on Lake Kara-Khol, as well as studying Tibetan and ancient Mongolian texts. Following the opening of a school in Kara-Khol, Shoigu attended and quickly developed strong knowledge of the Tuvan language. He assisted teachers with schoolwork in Kara-Khol and also participated in literacy campaigns in Tuva. Following the Soviet entry into World War II, Shoigu began working as a gold miner.

Shoigu's political career began in journalism, with a six-year stint as editor of the Tuvan-language Shyn newspaper. He also served as head of the Tuvan archives. Following the Soviet annexation of Tuva, Shoigu began working within the Communist Party of the Soviet Union, and became a secretary of the Tuvan Regional Committee of the Communist Party of the Soviet Union. During the 1950s he also met Aleksandra Kudryavtseva, whom he later married and bore his three children; Larisa (1953–2021), Sergei (born 1955), and Irina (born 1960). At that time he had already married once and fathered a daughter named Svetlana.

During the 1980s, he served as Deputy Chairman of the Council of Ministers of the Tuvan ASSR. After his son became Minister of Emergency Situations, Kuzhuget achieved attention from outside of Tuva. He would later write two books (The Vulture's Black Feathers in 2001 and Tannu-Tuva: Land of Lakes and Blue Rivers in 2004) on the history of Tuva during his lifetime. He also co-wrote the seven-book anthology Uriankhai: Tyva depter on Tuvan history with K. D. Arakchaa.

== Death and legacy ==
Kuzhuget Shoigu died at the age of 89 on 1 December 2010. He was buried two days later in a Moscow funeral attended by his family and politicians throughout Russia. At a speech during his funeral, Sholban Kara-ool, head of the Republic of Tuva, credited Shoigu for his role in the development of Tuva and the establishment of "patriotic and moral education". In 2014, a school in his native village of Kara-Khol was posthumously renamed after him.
