= Andrei Makarov (ice hockey, born 1966) =

Russian ice hockey player

- Born: January 25, 1966 (age 60) Novokuznetsk, Russia
- Height: 6 ft 0 in (183 cm)
- Weight: 194 lb (88 kg; 13 st 12 lb)
- Position: Centre
- Played for: Metallurg Novokuznetsk (RSL)
- NHL draft: Undrafted
- Playing career: 1986–1994

Andrei Makarov (born January 25, 1966) is a Russian former professional ice hockey player. He played in the Russian Superleague as a member of Metallurg Novokuznetsk.
