= Aleksandr Sergeyevich Makarov =

Russian politician

Aleksandr Sergeyevich Makarov (born in 1946) was the mayor of Tomsk from 1996 to 2011. He was born in Slavyansk-na-Kubani, Krasnodar Krai, before moving to Tomsk with his family. After graduating from the Tomsk Medical Institute, he worked as a surgeon in Krasnoyarsk Krai before returning to Tomsk to work in the local psychiatric hospital. He later entered the Tomsk State Pedagogical University and earned his teaching certification.

After two years of teaching, Makarov entered public service: first as the chairman of the presidium of the council of people's deputies of Sovietskii Rayon (1990–1992) and later as the head of the Sovietskii raion administration (1992–1996). In 1994, he won a seat in the Tomsk Oblast duma. His seat in the duma became a springboard for his run for the mayorship of the city in 1996. Makarov defeated Gennadiy Konovalov that year and was re-elected in 2001 and 2006. From 1996–2001 he served simultaneously as mayor and as an oblast duma deputy.

== Arrest ==
On 6 December 2006, Makarov was taken into custody on charges of abusing his office. He was initially accused of extorting over three million rubles ($114,000) from residents by threatening to destroy their real estate and preventing them from rebuilding. After further investigations, the police reported that they discovered Makarov held over $1.5 million worth of cash in his apartments. A search of his home uncovered one million rubles ($38,000) with another 300,000 rubles ($11,400) on the mayor himself. 8 December the court of the Soviet region of Tomsk has concluded of the mayor under the sentinel, a 11 December temporarily has discharged of the position down to adjudging court.

During the search of his home, Makarov suffered a heart attack and was admitted to the hospital. Legal proceedings were suspended while he is being treated. However, the prosecutor, Sergei Panov, is considered further charges and alleged that Makarov made threats against investigators. The press service of the regional prosecutor's office argued that the condition of the ousted mayor is good enough for the trial to continue.

On 12 December the official charges against Makarov were announced.

Makarov's attorney, Natalia Azurova, protested to the court that the prosecutor's actions were illegal. Specifically, she claimed that searches were conducted at the homes of his children, sums of money found were not in the "eight figures" claimed by prosecutors. She also alleged that the arrest and charge of the mayor of Tomsk should be considered a political action. as the customers of the arrest considers (counts) the speaker of a regional duma Bоris Maltsev and former deputy Duma of Russia Vladimir Jidkih.

Makarov became the informal leader of cities known for reducing their authority for the benefit of the governors. He was perturbed by the legislative leadership cancelling elections for mayor, of which a number of deputies from United Russia have put forward for discussion of the Russian parliament and have said was dangerous and even criminal. Advice of Europe had acted against the given bill. Makarov's daughter declared that the governor of the Tomsk region, Viktor Kress, was also involved in the arrest of her father apart from Maltsev and Jidkih.

On 26 December 2006, further charges were brought against him by the prosecutor's office after it was claimed that the police found large amounts of opium in his apartment. On 26 January 2007 Makarov was charged with abusing official authorities for personal gain. In April 2007, the European Court considered the Makarov's arrest as an issue of human rights. On 27 April 2007 the mayor was accused of bribery and wrongful participation in enterprise activities.

On 12 March 2009 Alexander Makarov has scored in European court on human rights business against Russia. As noted in the communiqué of the Strasbourg court, from February 5, 2007 to November 20, 2008, the court extended his term of imprisonment six times in order to prevent Makarova's possible influence on the trial. However, in the Court's opinion, the Russian courts did not sufficiently substantiate why Makarov's ransom could pose a danger to legal proceedings. On 9 April, the Supreme Court of Russia released him on bail for 4 million rubles.

On 1 October 2010 Tomsk Regional Court re-arrested Makarov. On 3 November, the jury found him guilty on 7 out of 9 charges. On 15 November, The Tomsk Regional Court found the temporarily suspended mayor guilty. He is sentenced to 12 years in prison.

On 18 October 2011 the Criminal Division of the Russian Supreme Court dismissed the complaint of lawyers regarding Makarov. In connection with the entry into force of the verdict, Makarov's powers as mayor of Tomsk were terminated in accordance with Article 36 of the Charter of the city. Makarov was transferred from prison to correctional colony No.4 in Tomsk before being moved to penal colony number 3 in Irkutsk in March 2012.

On 3 September 2015 the Kuibyshev district court granted parole for Makarov. On 11 September the prosecutor's office appealed the court's decision before the Irkutsk Regional Court dismissed their appeal on 8 June 2016: The action the Kuibyshev District Court of Irkutsk took on the parole Alexander Makarov was declared lawful; he was released the following day.

Sentence Tomsk Mayor Alexander Makarov 12 years in prison for abuse of office, blackmail and bribe-taking - this is a harsh sentence passed to the head of the Russian city at that time. In August 2016 the mayor of Yaroslavl Yevgeny Urlashov on charges of extorting bribes to learn more than Makarov: 12 1/2 colony.
