= Aleksandr Makarov (winger) =

Russian footballer

Personal information
- Full name: Aleksandr Vladimirovich Makarov
- Date of birth: 14 March 1978 (age 48)
- Place of birth: Dolgoprudny, Russian SFSR
- Height: 1.80 m (5 ft 11 in)
- Position: Winger

Senior career*
Years	Team	Apps	(Gls)
1995	FC Dynamo-2 Moscow	38	(5)
1996–1997	FC Dynamo-d Moscow	76	(8)
1998–1999	FC Dynamo Moscow	5	(0)
1998–1999	FC Dynamo-2 Moscow	60	(5)
2000	FC Shinnik Yaroslavl	5	(0)
2000–2004	FC Khimki	119	(4)
2005	FC Metallurg-Kuzbass Novokuznetsk	35	(0)
- * Club domestic league appearances and goals

Aleksandr Vladimirovich Makarov (Russian: Александр Владимирович Макаров; born 14 March 1978) is a retired Russian professional footballer. He made his professional debut in the Russian Third Division in 1995 for FC Dynamo-2 Moscow.

== Honours ==
- Russian Cup finalist: 2005 (played in the early stages of the 2004/05 tournament for FC Khimki).
