= Andrei Makarov (ice hockey, born 1964) =

Russian ice hockey player

- Born: March 8, 1964 (age 62) Russia
- Height: 6 ft 1 in (185 cm)
- Weight: 194 lb (88 kg; 13 st 12 lb)
- Position: Forward
- Shot: Left
- Played for: Ak Bars Kazan (RSL)
- NHL draft: Undrafted
- Playing career: 1983–1997

Andrei Makarov (born March 8, 1964) is a Russian former professional ice hockey player. He played in the Russian Superleague as a member of Ak Bars Kazan.
