= Alexander Makarov (ice hockey, born 1962) =

Russian ice hockey player

- Born: May 19, 1962 (age 63) Togliatti, Russia
- Position: Forward
- Played for: Soviet; Salavat Yulaev Ufa; HC Spartak Moscow
- Playing career: 1981–1988

Alexander Makarov (born May 19, 1962) is a Russian former professional ice hockey forward. He played parts of two seasons in the Soviet Championship League with Salavat Yulaev Ufa and HC Spartak Moscow.
