= Alexander Makarov (ice hockey, born 1989) =

Russian ice hockey player

- Born: September 28, 1989 (age 35); Moscow, Russian SFSR
- Height: 6 ft 2 in (188 cm)
- Weight: 205 lb (93 kg; 14 st 9 lb)
- Position: Defence
- Shoots: Left
- KHL team Former teams: HC Yugra; HC Vityaz; Torpedo Nizhny Novgorod; Metallurg Novokuznetsk
- Playing career: 2008–present

Alexander Makarov (born September 28, 1989) is a Russian professional ice hockey defenceman playing with HC Yugra of the Kontinental Hockey League (KHL).

Makarov made his Kontinental Hockey League debut with HC Vityaz during the inaugural 2008–09 KHL season.
