= Uryankhay Krai =

1914–1921 Russian protectorate in Tuva

Uryankhay Krai Урянхайский край (Russian) Таңды Урянхай (Tuvan)
- 1914–1921
- Flag of Uriankhai Krai 1918–1921

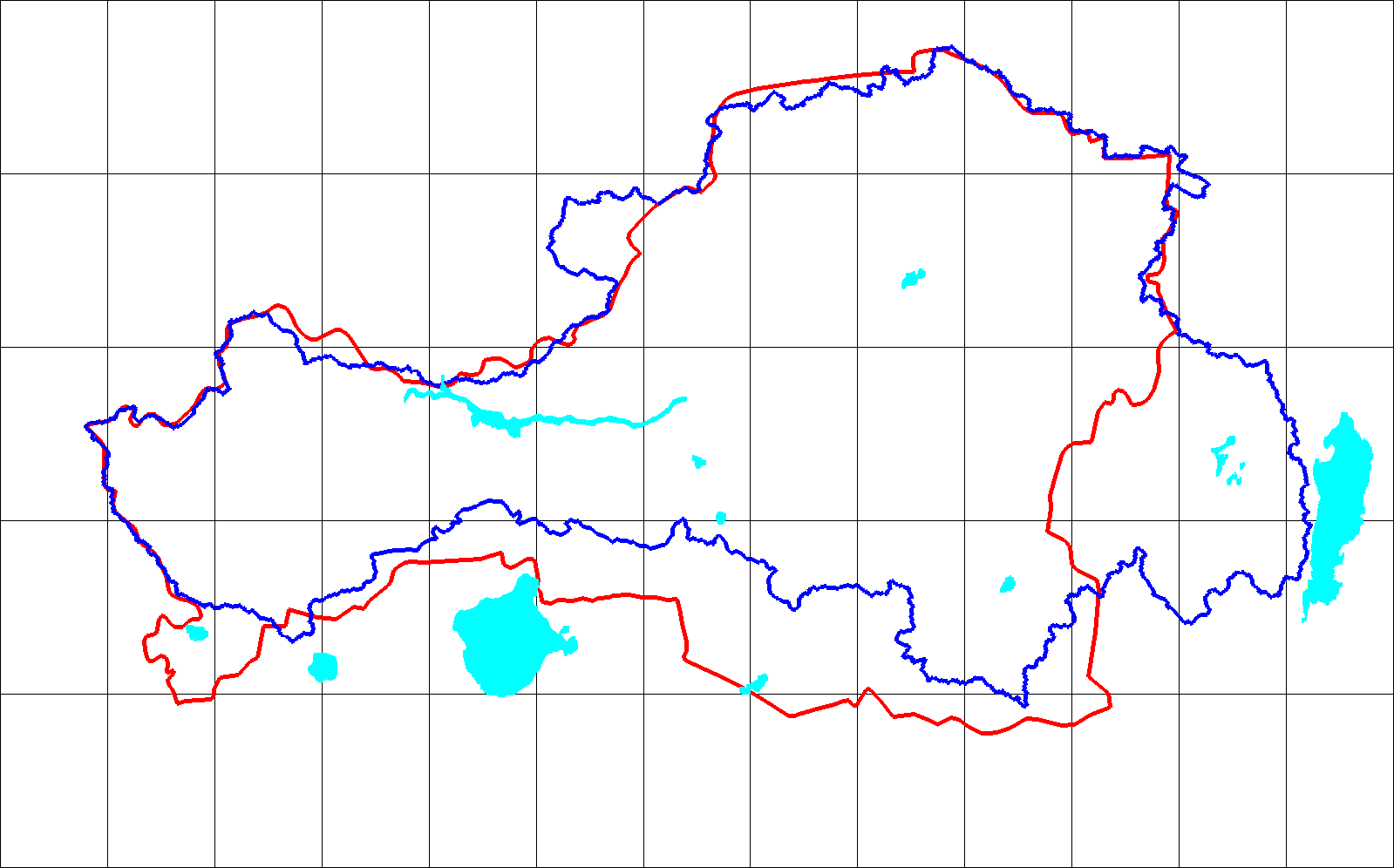
- Blue line is the Uryankhay Krai's border. Red line is the Tuvan Autonomous Oblast border.
- Status: Protectorate of Russia
- Capital: Belotsarsk
- Common languages: Tuvan; Russian; Chinese
- Religion: Tibetan Buddhism (Gelupga); Tuvan Shamanism; Russian Orthodoxy; Old Believers
- Demonym: Tuvan
- Government: Russian Protectorate
- Amban Noyan
  - 1914–1915: Oyun Kombu-Dorzhu
  - 1915–1916: Irgit Agbaan-Demchi
  - 1916–1921: Oyun Kombu-Dorzhu oglu Sodunam-Balchyr
- Historical era: World War I, Russian Civil War
  - Established: 17 April 1914
  - Soviet Red Army removal of White russian and Chinese forces (end of Uriankhai Krai) Transformed into:(Tuvan Peoples Republic): 14 August 1921

Area
  - Total: 168,804 km^{2} (65,176 sq mi) (91st)

Population
  - 1914: 73,000
| Preceded by | Succeeded by |
| Tannu Uriankhai; Chinese occupation of Outer Mongolia | Chinese occupation of Outer Mongolia; Tannu-Tuva People's Republic |
- Today part of: Russia

Uryankhay Krai (Note: Russian: Урянхайский край, romanized: Urjanhajskij kraj; Tuvan: Таңды Урянхай, romanized: Tañdı Uryanxay, [tʰɑŋˈtɤ ʊɾʲanˈχaj]; Mongolian: Урянхайн хязгаар, romanized: Urianhain hiazgaar, pronounced [ʊrʲæɴˈχæɛ̯ɴ çʲæt͡sˈʁ̥aːr]; simplified Chinese: 唐努乌梁海; traditional Chinese: 唐努烏梁海; pinyin: Tángnǔ Wūliánghǎi) was the name of what is today Tuva and was a short-lived protectorate of the Russian Empire that was proclaimed on 17 April 1914, created from Tannu Uriankhai which had recently proclaimed its independence from the Qing dynasty of China in the Mongolian Revolution of 1911. After the February Revolution and abdication of Tsar Nicholas II, Uryankhay Krai recognized the new Russian Republic and reaffirmed its status as a Russian protectorate in 1917.

During the Russian Civil War, the country was occupied by China and Russian "Whites" between 1918 and 1921. Supported by the Red Army, the Tuvan People's Revolutionary Party established the Soviet puppet state of the Tuvan People's Republic (initially Tannu Tuva) on 14 August 1921.

== Background ==
The name Uryankhay is of Mongolian origin, and was the Russian exonym for Tuvans from the 17th century up through the early 20th century. The term was also the Tuvan endonym until the early 19th century, when they began referring to themselves as Tuvans, likely after a subgroup in the region. The protectorate's borders roughly correspond with that of the contemporary Russian Tuvan Republic. Much of Uryankhay Krai's territory was mountainous. The territory was bound by the Tannu-Ola mountains to the south, and the Sayan Mountains to the north.

== History ==
Tuva had been under the rule of the Qing dynasty since the mid-18th century. However, Russian settlers began immigrating en masse to the region in 1838 and 1839, following the discovery of gold deposits in the area. In subsequent years, Russians began constructing gold mines and establishing trading institutions in the region. Throughout the mid and late 19th century, a number of Russian scientists began documenting the region's native flora and studying the Tuvan people, and Russian settlers continued to immigrate to the region. Russian interest in the region continued through the early 20th century, and the Tsarist government sponsored a number of expeditions from 1906 through 1910 to locate mineral deposits in the area. By 1909, it was estimated that approximately 9,000 ethnically Russian settlers lived in the region.

=== Independent Uryankhay ===
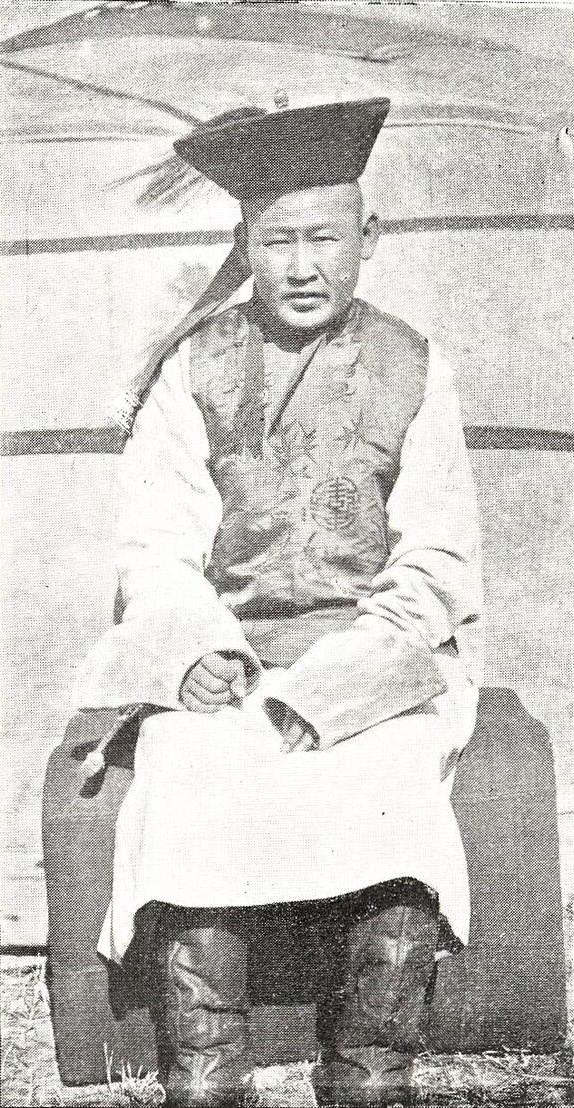
Oyun Ölzey-Ochur oglu Kombu-Dorzhu

Despite the increasing Russian presence in the region, the region remained part of the Qing dynasty, until the aftermath of the 1911 Xinhai Revolution. The Qing dynasty collapsed in 1912, and Tuvan independence was proclaimed. The country found itself against the newly established Republic of China, which sought to reclaim Mongolia and Tannu Uriankhai as part of its territory. However, Tannu Uriankhai's leaders found itself divided over which path to take the country, with some speaking in favor of joining the Russian sphere of influence, some seeking to turn to China, and some seeking a course of action completely independent of both larger powers. Ultimately, Tuvan and Mongolian leaders appealed for Russian protection against Chinese reintegration, de facto joining the Russian sphere of influence. In 1912 and 1913, Tuvan leaders appealed to Tsar Nicholas II to grant Russian citizenship to Tuvans in Tannu Uriankhai, giving legitimacy to Russian interests in the Republic, and laying the groundwork for a Tuvan protectorate.

=== Tsarist protectorate ===
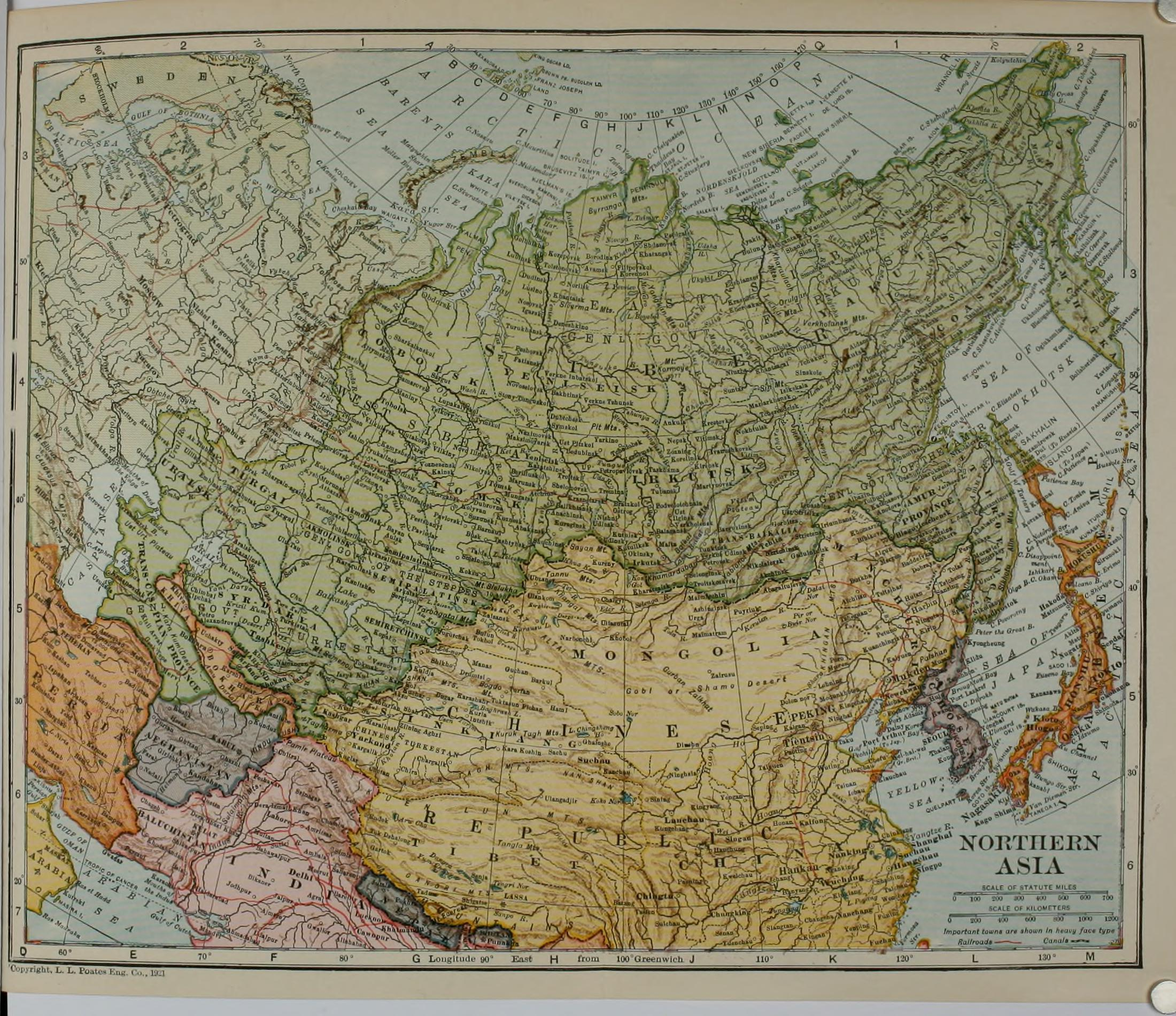
Uryankhai krai, Outer Mongolia and Tibet in 1921, shown as part of the Republic of China

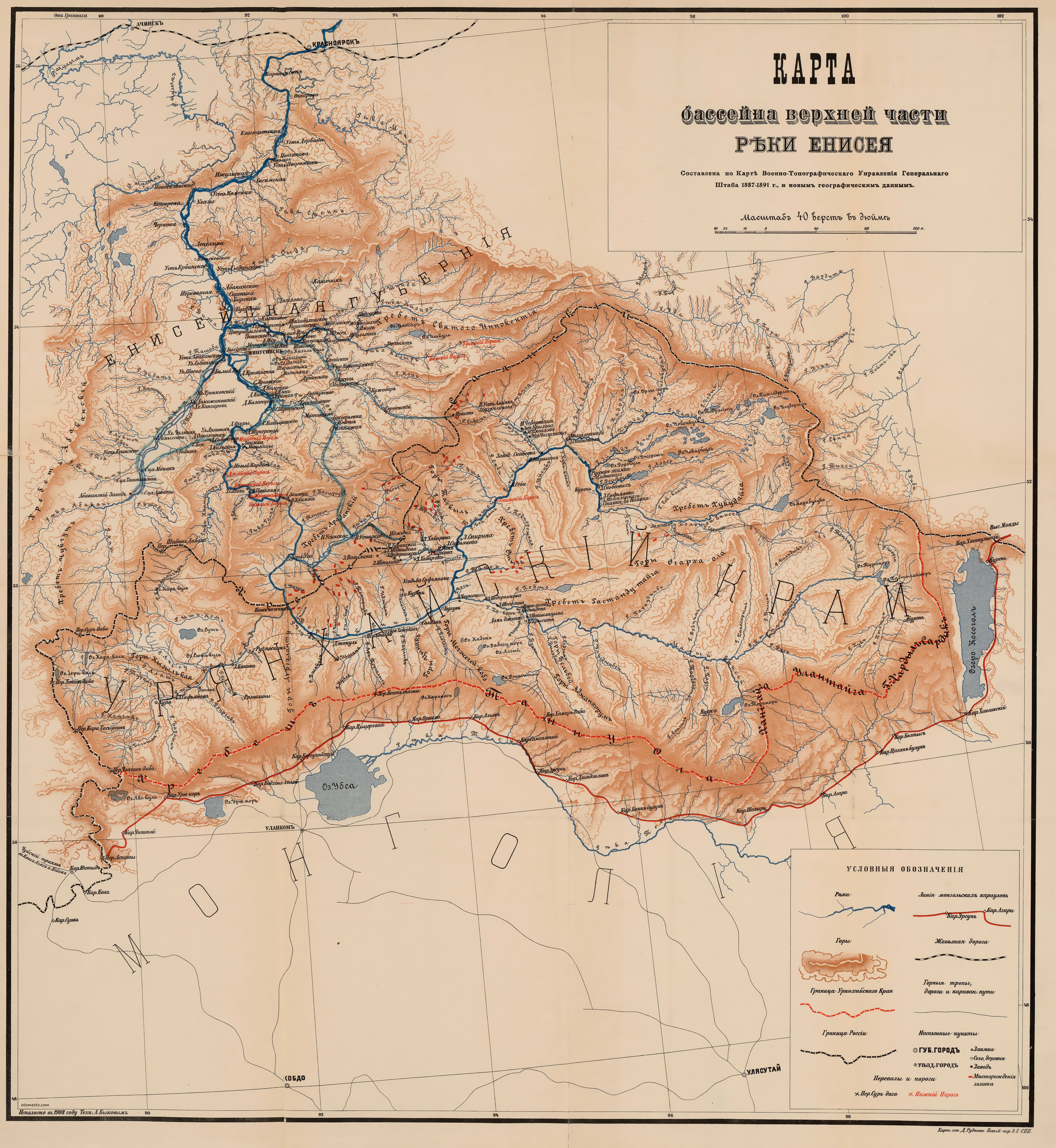
Map of the upper reaches of the Yenisei and the Uryankhai krai at the beginning of the 20th century

On 4 April 1914, Nicholas II signed a declaration granting Russian citizenship to the citizens of five Uryankhay kozhuun (Tuvan: кожуун; Russian: хошун, khoshun), the Republic's administrative divisions, which began the practice of a formal Russian protectorate in the region. This declaration also saw the admission of seven kozhuun into the Yeniseysk Governorate, although local government structures largely remained unchanged. Uryankhay Krai was established on 17 April 1914. The government was based in the city of Belotsarsk (Russian: Белоцарск), which was founded by Russian settlers that year, which was later renamed to Kyzyl.

On 7 June 1915 (25 May in the Old style calendar), the Kyakhta Russian-Sino-Mongolian Triple Agreement (Russian: Кяхтинское русско-китайско-монгольское тройственное соглашение) was signed, which formalized territorial boundaries between Russia, China, Mongolia, and Uryankhay Krai. The entry of Russia into World War I saw more skepticism towards Russia among the Uryankhay Krai's elites, and emboldened figures in the protectorate who sought closer political ties with China. Following the February Revolution, the new Provisional Government continued to uphold Uryankhay Krai's status as a protectorate, and in August 1917, the Provisional Government established a series of local reorganized governments in Siberia.

=== Soviet rule ===
However, Tsarist rule in Uryankhay Krai did not last long, and the Soviets took the region on 16 March 1918. Soon after, Soviet forces began an ambitious redistribution program in Uryankhay Krai, redistributing livestock herds and the property of prominent Russian merchants.

In June 1918, the local Soviet government adopted the Treaty on the Self-Determination of Tuva (Russian: Договор о самоопределении Тувы), which sought to end the protectorate status of Uryankhay Krai, and established an independent Soviet government in the region. However, this decision was met with resistance among the protectorate's elites, who invited Mongolian and Chinese troops and diplomats into the region, and began deepening political and economic ties with the two countries. The entrance of Chinese and Mongolian troops in the region sparked the potential for a violent confrontation between the two countries' forces and local Red Army troops, however the Provisional Siberian Government in Omsk managed to negotiated the exit of the two countries' forces shortly after, avoiding any confrontation. Nevertheless, sympathies towards the two countries remained, with local Tuvans remaining largely loyal to the region's elites, and Chinese goods remaining cheaper than those made from Russia. The local Soviet government implemented a ban against the import of Mongolian and Chinese goods, however, this went largely unenforced, and merchants from the two countries often entered Uryankhay Krai, and spread anti-Soviet propaganda.

Anti-Soviet efforts in the region proved a convincing success, and the local Soviet government collapsed in July 1918, and the Provisional Siberian Government led by Pyotr Vologodsky took its place. This new government sought to win the support of local Tuvans through providing support to local elites and Buddhist institutions, and implement a number of functioning public services. The Provisional Government also prioritized established control over the nearby border with Mongolia, hoping to limit Chinese and Mongolian excursions into Uryankhay Krai. Emboldened by deepening economic ties and a close political relation with many Tuvan elites, Chinese general Yang Shichao marched troops into Uryankhay Krai in the fall of 1918, occupying much of the region's southern and western portions. Shortly after, Mongolian troops led by Khatanbaatar Magsarjav followed suit, occupying additional positions within the south of Uryankhay Krai. This further weakened the position of the Provisional Government, and prevented them from exercising much control over Uryankhay Krai.

Ultimately, a series of anti-Russian riots broke out in the region in the spring of 1919, driving out the Provisional Siberian Government without resistance. Soviet forces, led by Pyotr Shchetinkin and Alexander Kravchenko, entered Uryankhay Krai in the summer of 1919, hoping to use the region as a base to launch their expansion into Turkestan and to fight against the government of Alexander Kolchak. Following a series of negotiations with China and Mongolia, the Soviets negotiated a non-aggression agreement to apply to the region. In September 1919, the Red Army largely abandoned Uryankhay Krai in pursuit of Kolchak's forces, allowed Chinese and Mongolian forces to further expanded in the region. The Red Army quickly defeated Kolchak's army, and by early 1921, expelled Chinese forces from Uryankhay Krai. Upon the outbreak of the Mongolian Revolution of 1921, Mongolian forces also evacuated the region, consolidating Soviet control in Uryankhay Krai.

Uryankhay Krai was succeeded by the Tannu Tuva People's Republic on 14 August 1921.

== Government and politics ==
The administrative divisions of the Uryankhay Krai remained largely unchanged from those introduced by the Qing in the mid-18th century. Uryankhay Krai was divided into kozhuun (Tuvan: кожуун; Russian: хошун, khoshun), which functioned as administrative units with taxation powers headed by leaders known as ukherids (Tuvan: ухэрид; Russian: огурд, ogurd). The national government of Uryankhay Krai was de jure headed by a leader titled Amban Noyan (Russian: Амдын-Нойон, Amdyn-Noyon). In the first few years of Uryankhay Krai, the Russian Empire maintained a Russian Commissar, who was tasked with managing the flow of Russian settlers into the protectorate. The protectorate's government was seated in Kyzyl.

However, Uryankhay Krai's various governments were often short-lived and ineffective, due to the volatile nature of the Russian Civil War, as well as strong Chinese and Mongolian influence, and periods of occupation by those two countries. The Soviet Union took control of Uryankhay Krai on 16 March 1918, less than four years after the Uryankhay Krai was established as a protectorate. Mere months later, the Chinese and Mongolian troops occupied much of Uryankhay Krai, and the Provisional Siberian Government in Omsk took over the region. Less than a year later, the Provisional Siberian Government was also expelled from the region, and the Soviet Union assumed brief control for another few months, before Chinese and Mongolian troops occupied Uryankhay Krai. Occupation by China and Mongolia lasted from mid-1919 until early 1921, when the Soviet Union reassumed control, and abolished Uryankhay Krai in favor of the Tannu Tuva People's Republic mere months later.

Uryankhay Krai's politics were largely dominated by disputes among local elites over whether to geopolitically align with Russia or China. Groups advocated for the former won victory in organizing the region as a Russian protectorate, but despite this, leaders who tilted more towards China remained prominent during the existence of the protectorate. These forces saw their influence amplified following Russia's largely disastrous entry into World War I, and once again following the Soviet takeover of the protectorate in March 1918. In the summer of 1918, local leaders invited Chinese and Mongolian troops into the region, although they were expelled following a negotiation mediated by the Provisional Siberian Government in Omsk. To win support among the locals, the Provisional Siberian Government attempted to organize an effective judicial system, police force, postal service, and road network. Local officials made establishing a road connection with the nearby city of Minusinsk a priority.

Despite these plans to win the support of local Tuvans, Chinese and Mongolian troops re-entered portions of southern and western Uryankhay Krai in the fall of 1918, creating additional challenges. To prevent a broader ideological tilt towards China and Mongolia, the Provisional Government also sought to give power to local Tuvan elites, and win the support of Buddhist institutions and figures such as the local Khambo Lama. In March 1919, the Khambo Lama wrote a letter supporting the status of being a Russian protectorate, and proclaimed that the region of Tuva was never truly a part of China or Mongolia. As a result, the Provisional Government provided logistical and financial support for the Khambo Lama, and the proliferation of Buddhist teachings throughout the region. They also planned for the establishment of an assembly of local kozhuun leaders, as well as the implementation of local government organizations headed by Noyans, all contingent on the oversight of the Provisional Government, which would have the final say in elections and decision-making matters. These officials were to be given special rewards should they prove their loyalty to the Provisional Government, in the form of cloth, cattle, agricultural equipment, and other simple goods.

However, the continued occupation of part of Uryankhay Krai by China and Mongolia, coupled with the Provisional Government's numerous military defeats at the hand of the Red Army, ensured that the Provisional Government exercised little de facto control, and could not realize such ambitious plans. The ineffectiveness of the Provisional Government, combined with ethnic tensions and anti-Russian sentiment, led to the local Tuvan population driving out the Provisional Government in the spring of 1919, as well as many Russian settlers. Red Army forces briefly occupied the region in the summer of 1919, before turning elsewhere, allowing China and Mongolia to exact control over the region. In the following three years, the Red Army began decisively winning the Russian Civil War and consolidating power, enabling them to expel Chinese forces in early 1921. Mongolian forces left voluntarily following the Mongolian Revolution of 1921. Shortly after, the Tannu Tuva People's Republic was proclaimed on 14 August 1921.

== Demographics ==
Upon the protectorate's founding, its total population was approximately 73,000. In 1914, there were less than 4,000 ethnic Russians in the protectorate, however, this number grew to about 12,000 by 1917.
