= Flag of Tuva =

Tuva
- Proportion: 2:3
- Adopted: 8 February 2002
- Design: A horizontal light blue; with a golden yellow triangle based on the hoist bordered with a white triangle. Over the partition lines is a blue pall edged in white.
- Designed by: Oyun-ool Sat, I. C. Salchak and O. I. Lazarev
- Flag of Tuva from 1992 until 2002. The flag had a ratio of 1:2
- Proportion: 1:2
- Adopted: 17 September 1992
- Design: A horizontal light blue; with a golden yellow triangle based on the hoist bordered with a white triangle. Over the partition lines is a blue pall edged in white.

The state flag of Tuva (Note: Russian: Государственный Флаг Республики Тыва; Tuvan: Тыва Республиканың Күрүне Тугу) in Russia is a light blue field with a white-fimbriated pall of the same color bordering a yellow triangle on the hoist.

White symbolizes silver and virtue; additionally, it is common in the Republic of Tuva for hostesses to greet guests with silver streamers in their arms. The golden yellow triangle symbolizes gold and Tibetan Buddhism. Blue symbolizes the morals of nomadic herdsmen (which are commonly respected in the region), as well the Tuvan sky. The blue pall symbolizes the confluence of the Bii-Khem (Bolshoy Yenisei) and Kaa-Khem (Maly Yenisei) rivers at the Tuvan capital of Kyzyl, where they form the Yenisey River, known to locals as the Ulug-Khem River.

The flag was created on 17 September 1992, by Oyun-ool Sat, I. C. Salchak and O. I. Lazarev. The proportions are 2:3.

== Historical flags ==
Flag	Years of use	Ratio	Government	Description
	?–1921	1:2	Uryankhay Krai	The banner of the Amban Noyan of Tuva, first used during the Qing period inspired by the Eight Banners system. This banner was used until the end of the Uryankhay Krai.
	1921–1926	1:2	Tannu-Tuva People's Republic	After the proclamation of independence on 14 August 1921 the new republic used an unofficial flag of which there are several reconstructions.
	1921–1926	1:2	Tannu-Tuva People's Republic	Alternate reconstruction.
	1926–1930	1:2	Tuvan People's Republic	The first official flag of Tuva, approved in the 3rd constitution. The inscription reads "Tuvan People's Republic" (Bügüde Nayiramdaqu Tuva Arad Ulus). (24 November 1926 – 18 October 1930)
	1930–1935	1:2	Tuvan People's Republic	Under influence from the Soviet Union, Tuva changed its written language from Mongol script to the Cyrillic script on 28 June 1930. On 18 October 1930 a new constitution changed the flag. Based on the description compared to the 1926 version the Khorlo was removed and the background changed to red. In addition, the inclusion of the inscriptions "TAR" and "Proletarians of the world and the oppressed peoples of the East, unite!" were specified.(18 October 1930 – 2 July 1935)
	1935–1939/1941	1:2	Tuvan People's Republic	On 2 July 1935 the flag and emblem of the country was changed.(2 July 1935 – 1939 / 25 June 1941)
	1939–1941	1:2	Tuvan People's Republic	There existed an alternate version of this flag with only one line of text, which matches the change made to the Tuvan emblem in 1939. Since the flag was simply "red with the emblem in the center" it automatically changed along with the emblem and there was no formal change in the flag until 1941.
	1941–1943	1:2	Tuvan People's Republic	In solidarity with the Soviet Union after the German invasion, Tuva changed its flag in the newly adopted constitution of 1941, to more resemble the flags of the Soviet republics. The flag uses the initials of the state (Tıwa Arat Respublik) (25 June 1941 – 8 September 1943)
	1943–1944	1:2	Tuvan People's Republic	With the adoption of the Cyrillic alphabet in 1943, the flag used Cyrillic letters (Тыва Арат Республик). The Tuvan People's Republic was fully absorbed into the Soviet Union on 11 October 1944, and local flags and symbols were abolished.(8 September 1943 – 11 October 1944)
	1943–1944	1:2	Tuvan People's Republic	A possible variant of the 1943–1944 flag, featuring a hammer and sickle.
	1944–1954	1:2	Tuvan Autonomous Oblast	In 1944, the USSR annexed Tuva and founded the Tuvan Autonomous Oblast. It did not use a flag of its own.
	1954–1961	1:2	Tuvan Autonomous Oblast	In 1944, the USSR annexed Tuva and founded the Tuvan Autonomous Oblast. It did not use a flag of its own.
	1961–1962	1:2	Tuvan Autonomous Soviet Socialist Republic	In 1961, the USSR reformed the Tuvan Autonomous Oblast into the Tuvan Autonomous Soviet Socialist Republic, as part of the Russian SFSR. First flag was not created until 1962.
	1962–1971	1:2	Tuvan Autonomous Soviet Socialist Republic	Flag of the Russian Soviet Federative Socialist Republic with the Russian inscription – Тувинская АССР
	1971–1978	1:2	Tuvan Autonomous Soviet Socialist Republic	Flag of the Russian Soviet Federative Socialist Republic with the Russian inscription – Тувинская АССР
	1978–1990	1:2	Tuvan Autonomous Soviet Socialist Republic	Flag of the Russian Soviet Federative Socialist Republic with the Russian – Тувинская АССР and Tuvan inscription – Тыва АССР
	1990–1992	1:2	Tuvan Soviet Socialist Republic (12 December 1990 – 31 March 1992) and the Republic of Tuva (31 March – 17 September 1992)	Flag of the Russian Soviet Federative Socialist Republic with the Russian – Тувинская ССР and Tuvan inscription – Тыва ССР
	1992–2002	1:2	Republic of Tuva	Flag of Tuva from 1992 until 2002. The flag had a ratio of 1:2
	2002–present	2:3	Republic of Tuva	Current flag

== Colour scheme ==
Colors scheme	Blue	White	Yellow
RAL	6027	9016	1021
CMYK	57-22-0-10	0-0-0-0	0-20-100-0
HEX	#63B3E6	#FFFFFF	#FECC00
RGB	99-179-230	255-255-255	254-204-0

== See also ==
- Flag of Mongolia
- Flag of Buryatia
- Flag of Kalmykia
- Flag of Agin-Buryat Okrug
- Flag of Ust-Orda Buryat Okrug
- Flag of Vanuatu (adopted 1980), which the flag of Tuva closely resembles.
- Flag of South Africa (adopted 1994), which the flag of Tuva also closely resembles.
