= Coat of arms of the Republic of Tuva =

Coat of arms of the Tuva Republic, Russia

Emblem of the Republic of Tuva
- Armiger: Republic of Tuva
- Adopted: 1992

The emblem of Tuva is a light blue field with a yellow border. In the center of the field is a traditional horseman, symbolizing Tuva's sovereignty and spirit. The coat of arms was created in 1992, and is similar to the present state emblem of Mongolia, which was adopted that same year.

== Meaning of the colors ==
The yellow symbolizes gold and Tibetan Buddhism. Blue symbolizes the morals of nomadic herdsmen (who are commonly respected in the region), as well the Tuvan sky. The blue pall symbolizes the confluence of the Bii-Khem (Bolshoy Yenisei) and Kaa-Khem (Maly Yenisei) rivers at the Tuvan capital of Qızıl, where they form the Yenisey River, known to locals as the Ulug-Khem River. White symbolizes silver and virtue; additionally, it is common in Tuva for hostesses to greet guests with silver streamers in their arms.

== History ==
Emblem of the Tuvan Autonomous Soviet Socialist Republic
- Armiger: Tuvan Autonomous Soviet Socialist Republic
- Adopted: 10 January 1962
- Crest: Red star
- Supporters: Wheat and Cotton
- Motto: Бүгү делегейниң пролетарийлери, каттыжыңар! (Tuvan) Пролетарии всех стран, соединяйтесь! (Russian) "Workers of the world, unite!"

=== First version ===
By decree of the Presidium of the Supreme Soviet of the RSFSR of October 9, 1961, the Tuvan Autonomous Oblast was transformed into the Tuva Autonomous Soviet Socialist Republic, which was confirmed by the Decree of the Presidium of the Supreme Soviet of the USSR of October 10, 1961 and approved by the USSR Law of December 8, 1961

On January 10, 1962, at the first session of the first convocation of the Supreme Soviet of the Tuva ASSR, the Supreme Soviet of the Tuva ASSR adopted the Decree of the Tuva ASSR "On the State Emblem, State Flag and the Capital of the Tuva Autonomous Soviet Socialist Republic".Article

The State Emblem of the Tuva ASSR is the State Emblem of the RSFSR with the inscriptions "РСФСР" and "Proletarians of all countries, unite!" in Russian and Tuvan languages, with the addition of under the "RSFSR" inscription in letters of a smaller size of the inscription "Тув.АССР" in Russian and Tuvan languages.

— On the State Emblem, State Flag and the Capital of the Tuva Autonomous Soviet Socialist Republic (1962), Article 1

In the design of the emblem. the inscription "ТУВИНСКАЯ АССР" was quoted in Russian completely and was located under the inscription "ТЫВА АССР".

=== Second version ===
On November 10, 1978, at the extraordinary eighth session of the Supreme Soviet of the fourth convocation of the Tuva ASSR, the Supreme Soviet approved the first Constitution of the Tuva ASSR. The article 157 of the constitution described the State Emblem of the Tuva ASSR. A few minor changes was made in the emblem, on which a red five-pointed star was added to the emblem and the order of the inscriptions was changed: the inscription "ТУВИНСКАЯ АССР" was placed above the inscription "ТЫВА АССР".

== Gallery ==
De facto emblem of the Tannu-Tuva People's Republic (1921-1926)

Emblem of the Tuvan People's Republic (1926–1930)

Emblem of the Tuvan People's Republic (1930)

Emblem of the Tuvan People's Republic (1930–1935)

Emblem of the Tuvan People's Republic (1935–1939)

Emblem of the Tuvan People's Republic (1939–1941)

Emblem of the Tuvan People's Republic (1941–1943)

Emblem of the Tuvan People's Republic (1943–1944)

Emblem of the Tuvan Autonomous Soviet Socialist Republic (1962–1978)

Emblem of the Tuvan Autonomous Soviet Socialist Republic (1978–1992)

== See also ==
- Flag of Tuva
