= Tooruktug dolgai tañdym =

Tuvan folk song

English: The Taiga Filled With Pine Nuts
- Tuvan: Тооруктуг долгай таңдым
- Emblems of the Tuvan People's Republic (left) and the Tuvan Autonomous Soviet Socialist Republic (right)
- Former anthem of Tuva
- Lyrics: Ayana Samiyayevna Mongush
- Adopted: 1944 (by the TAR and then by the TAO); 1961 (by the Tuvan ASSR); 1992 (by Tuva)
- Relinquished: 11 August 2011
- Preceded by: Tuvan Internationale
- Succeeded by: "Men – tyva men"

Audio sample
- Khoomei rendition in D major: file; help

"Tooruktug dolgai tañdym" (Note: Tuvan: Тооруктуг долгай таңдым, pronounced [tʰo̞ːɾʊq̚tʊʁ to̞ɫɢɐj tʰɐ̃ŋdɤ̃m]; lit. 'The Taiga Filled With Pine Nuts') is a Tuvan folk song. It was first adopted in 1944 as the national anthem of the Tuvan People's Republic (TPR) when Tuva was an independent socialist republic recognised only by the Soviet Union and the Mongolian People's Republic. Later in the same year following the Soviet annexation of Tuva, the country was then incorporated into the USSR and thus became the Tuvan Autonomous Oblast (TAO). In 1961, the political status of the region was upgraded to the Tuvan Autonomous Soviet Socialist Republic, yet the anthem still remained.

Even after the dissolution of the Soviet Union, "Tooruktug dolgai tañdym" remained in use for the Republic of Tuva (a federal subject of Russia), until 11 August 2011, when it was replaced by the current anthem "Men – tyva men".

The song expresses the Tuvan belief that one who takes care of their environment, livestock and taiga will be fulfilled. It refers to the Tannu-Ola mountains, mentioned in the lyrics as "Tañdy" (Tuvan: Таңды [tʰɐ̃ŋdɤ]), a mountain range in southern Tuva that is revered by the Tuvan people. The name of the mountain range is incorporated into "Tannu-Tuva", the popular name for the Tuvan People's Republic.

The Tuvan Autonomous Soviet Socialist Republic and the Checheno-Ingush Autonomous Soviet Socialist Republic were once the only two autonomous republics among all republics in the Soviet Union to have official anthems.

== Lyrics ==
=== Tuvan original ===
Cyrillic script

Тооруктуг долгай таңдым
Долганзымза тодар-ла мен
Тос-ла чүзүн малымайны
𝄆 Доруктурза байыыр-ла мен. 𝄇

Эзириктиг ээр-ле таңдым
Эргилзимзе тодар-ла мен
Эрээн-шокар малымайны
𝄆 Азыраза байыыр-ла мен. 𝄇

Original orthography

Tooruktuƣ tolgaj taꞑdьm
Tolganzьmza todar-la men
Tos-la cyzyn malьmajnь
𝄆 Torukturza pajььr-la men. 𝄇

Eziriktiƣ eer-le taꞑdьm
Ergilzimze todar-la men
Ereen-şokar malьmajnь
𝄆 Azьraza pajььr-la men. 𝄇

Mongolian script

ᠲᠣᠣᠷᠣᠺᠲᠤᠭ ᠳᠣᠯᠭᠠᠢ ᠲᠠᠨ᠋ᠳ᠋ ᠍ ᠤᠮ
ᠳᠣᠯᠭᠠᠩᠵ ᠤᠮᠵᠠ ᠲᠣᠳᠣ ᠪᠠᠷ ᠯᠠ ᠮᠡᠩ
ᠲᠣᠰ ᠯᠠ ᠴᠦᠵᠦᠨ ᠮᠠ ᠤᠮᠠᠶᠢᠨ ᠤ
𝄆 ᠳᠣᠷᠤᠶᠢᠺᠲ᠋ᠣᠷᠵᠠ ᠪᠠᠢ ᠤ ᠤᠷ ᠯᠠ ᠮᠡᠩ 𝄇

ᠡᠵᠡᠢᠷᠢᠺᠲ᠋ᠢᠭ ᠡᠭᠡᠷᠡ ᠯᠡ ᠲᠠᠨ᠋ᠳ᠋ ᠍ ᠤᠮ
ᠡᠷᠭᠣᠯᠵᠡᠮᠵᠡ ᠲᠣᠳᠣ ᠪᠠᠷ ᠯᠠ ᠮᠡᠩ
ᠡᠷᠢᠶᠡᠨ ᠱᠣᠺᠠᠷ ᠮᠠ ᠤᠮᠠᠶᠢᠨ ᠤ
𝄆 ᠠᠰ ᠤᠠᠵᠠ ᠪᠠᠢ ᠤ ᠤᠷ ᠯᠠ ᠮᠡᠩ 𝄇

Latin script

Tooruktuğ dolgay tañdım
Dolganzımza todar-la men
Tos-la çüzün malımaynı
𝄆 Dorukturza bayıır-la men. 𝄇

Eziriktiğ eer-le tañdım
Ergilzimze todar-la men
Ereen-şokar malımaynı
𝄆 Azıraza bayıır-la men. 𝄇

IPA transcription (Note: See Help:IPA and Tuvan language#Phonology.)

[tʰo̞ː.ɾʊq̚.tʊʁ to̞ɫ.ɢɐj tʰɐ̃ŋ.dɤ̃m |]
[to̞ɫ.ɢɐ̃n.zɤ̃m.zɐ tʰo̞.dɐɾ.ɫɐ mẽ̞n ǁ]
[tʰo̞s.ɫɐ t͡ɕʏ.zʏ̃n mɐ.ɫɤ.mɐj.nɤ |]
𝄆 [to̞.ɾʊq̚.tʊɾ.zɐ pɐ.jɤːɾ.ɫɐ mẽ̞n ǁ] 𝄇

[e̞.zɪ.ɾɪk̚.tɪɣ e̞ːɾ.le̞ tʰɐ̃ŋ.dɤ̃m |]
[e̞ɾ.gɪl.zɪ̃m.ze̞ tʰo̞.dɐɾ.ɫɐ mẽ̞n ǁ]
[e̞.ɾẽ̞ːn.ɕo̞.qɐɾ mɐ.ɫɤ.mɐj.nɤ |]
𝄆 [ɐ.zɤ.ɾɐ.zɐ pɐ.jɤːɾ.ɫɐ mẽ̞n ǁ] 𝄇

=== English translation ===
When I wonder in my forest,
Satisfied I will always be.
Abound in livestock aplenty;
𝄆 With them rich I will always be. 𝄇

I was raised in wide open fields,
Which has made me strong and fearless.
Nine different animals to tend;
𝄆 I shall protect them to no end 𝄇
