= TASSR =

TASSR may refer to:

- Tatar Autonomous Soviet Socialist Republic, an autonomous polity of the Russian SFSR
- Tuvan Autonomous Soviet Socialist Republic, an autonomous polity of the Russian SFSR
