= Men – tyva men =

Regional anthem of Tuva, Russia

English: 'I Am a Tuvan'
- Мен — тыва мен
- Regional anthem of the Tuva Republic, Russia
- Also known as: «Государственный гимн Республики Тыва» (Russian) (English: 'State Anthem of the Republic of Tuva')
- Lyrics: Okei Shanagash (Bayantsagaan Oohii)
- Music: Kantomur Saryglar (Olonbayar Gantomir)
- Adopted: 11 August 2011
- Preceded by: "Tooruktug taiga"

Audio sample
- Vocal rendition in D minor: file; help

Instrumental rendition in D minor

"Men – tyva men" (Note: Tuvan: Мен — тыва мен; lit. 'I Am a Tuvan') is the regional anthem of the Republic of Tuva, a constituent republic of Russia. The music was composed by Kantomur Saryglar (Olonbayar Gantomir), and the lyrics were written by Okei Shanagash (Bayantsagaan Oohii). It was officially adopted by the Great Khural of Tuva on 11 August 2011, replacing the previous anthem "Tooruktug Dolgai Tangdym".

== History ==
Proposals were made to replace the previous anthem, "Tooruktug taiga", which was considered outdated with lyrics that seemed too meek and unpatriotic. A competition led by Deputy Chairman of the Government of Tuva, Anatoly Damba-Khuurak, in creating a new anthem began. Famous musicians, musicologists, scientists, historians and writers of the Tuva Republic entered the competition, and a total of 19 works were submitted for consideration.

The anthem "Men – tyva men", which was composed 11 years prior and had been considered an unofficial anthem then, was selected to serve as the republic's new anthem, although some authorities and musicians suggested against the idea. For example, Albert Kuvezin, leader of the group "Yat-Kha", said that he felt that "Men – tyva men" should not become the anthem of the Tuva Republic because "it must suit everyone, reflect all sides" and that Tuva is a "multinational republic after all." Nevertheless, "Men – tyva men" was chosen to be the anthem of the Republic of Tuva.

On 11 August 2011, the head of the Republic of Tuva, Sholban Kara-ool, signed Appendix No. 2 to the Constitutional Law of the Republic of Tuva No. 828 VX-I "On the National Anthem of the Republic of Tuva", which officially adopted "Men - tyva men" as the anthem. According to reviews from prominent members and public experts, "Men – tyva men" resonates well with Tuvans, as the lyrics evoke a sense of unity and spiritual uplift. After the official publication in the newspaper Tuvinskaya Pravda No. 85 on 13 August 2011, the song "Men – tyva men" was recognized as the state anthem of the Republic of Tuva. The author of the lyrics was not indicated in the official publication.

== Lyrics ==
Tuvan official

Cyrillic script	Latin script
Арт–арттың оваазынга Дажын салып чалбарган Таңды, Саян ыдыынга Агын өргээн тыва мен. Кожумаа: Мен — тыва мен, Мөңге харлыг дагның оглу мен. Мен — тыва мен, Мөңгүн суглуг чурттуң төлү мен. Өгбелерим чуртунда Өлчей тарып иженген, Өткүт хөөмей ырынга Өөрүп талаан тыва мен. Кожумаа Аймак чоннар бүлези Акы–дуңма найыралдыг, Депшилгеже чүткүлдүг Демниг чурттуг тыва мен. Кожумаа	Art–arttyng ovaazynga Dazhyn salyp chalbargan Tangdy, Saian ydyynga Agyn örgeen tyva men. Kozhumaa: Men — tyva men, Möngge harlyg dagnyng oglu men. Men — tyva men, Mönggün suglug churttung tölü men. Ögbelerim churtunda Ölchei taryp izhengen, Ötküt höömei yrynga Öörüp talaan tyva men. Kozhumaa Aimak chonnar bülezi Aky–dungma naiyraldyg, Depshilgezhe chütküldüg Demnig churttug tyva men. Kozhumaa
Mongolian script	IPA transcription (Note: See Help:IPA and Tuvan phonology.)
ᠠᠷᠤ ᠳᠤ–ᠠᠷᠲᠤᠲᠤ ᠶᠢᠨ ᠣᠪᠠᠰ ᠤᠨᠭᠠ ᠳᠠᠵᠢ ᠶᠢᠨ ᠰᠠᠯ ᠤᠫ ᠴᠢᠯᠪᠤᠷᠭᠠᠨ ᠲᠠᠨ᠋ᠳ᠋ ᠍ ᠤ᠂ ᠰᠠᠶᠠᠩ ᠢᠳ ᠤ ᠤᠨᠭᠠ ᠠᠭ᠎ᠠ ᠶᠢᠨ ᠥᠷᠦᠭᠡᠨ ᠲ ᠤᠸᠠ ᠮᠧᠨ᠃ ᠺᠣᠵᠤᠮᠢᠶᠠᠨ᠄ ᠮᠧᠨ — ᠲ ᠤᠸᠠ ᠮᠧᠨ᠂ ᠮᠥᠩᠭᠧ ᠬᠠᠷᠠᠯᠠ ᠶᠢ ᠳᠠᠨ ᠤᠨ ᠣᠭᠯᠤ ᠮᠧᠨ᠃ ᠮᠧᠨ — ᠲ ᠤᠸᠠ ᠮᠧᠨ᠂ ᠮᠥᠩᠭᠥᠭᠦᠨ ᠰᠤᠭᠤᠯᠤᠭ ᠴᠤᠷᠲᠤᠲᠤᠩ ᠲᠥᠯᠦ ᠮᠧᠨ᠃ ᠥᠭᠭᠦᠪᠧᠯᠧᠷᠢᠮ ᠴᠢᠷᠤᠨᠳᠠ ᠥᠴᠧᠢ ᠲᠠᠷᠰᠫ ᠢᠵᠧᠨᠭᠧᠨ᠂ ᠥᠲ᠋ᠺᠥᠲ ᠬᠥᠭᠡᠭᠡᠮᠧᠢ ᠢᠷ ᠤᠨᠭᠠ ᠥᠪᠡᠷᠡᠫ ᠲᠠᠯᠠᠭᠠᠨ ᠲ ᠤᠸᠠ ᠮᠧᠨ᠃ ᠺᠣᠵᠤᠮᠢᠶᠠᠨ ᠠᠶᠢᠮᠠᠺ ᠴᠢᠨᠣᠨᠠᠷ ᠪᠦᠯᠧᠽᠢ ᠠᠺ ᠤ–ᠳᠤᠩᠮ᠎ᠠ ᠨ ᠤ ᠶᠢᠷᠠᠯᠳᠠ ᠶᠢ᠂ ᠳ᠋ᠧᠫᠦᠰᠢᠯᠭᠧᠵᠧ ᠴᠦᠲ᠋ᠺᠥᠯᠡᠳᠦᠭ ᠳᠧᠮᠨᠢᠭ ᠴᠤᠷᠲᠤᠲᠤᠭ ᠲ ᠤᠸᠠ ᠮᠧᠨ᠃ ᠺᠣᠵᠤᠮᠢᠶᠠᠨ	[ɐɾtʰ‿ɐɾt̚.tʰɤ̃ŋ o̞.ʋɐː.zɤ̃n.ɢɐ |] [t̬ɐ.ʑɤ̃n sɐ.ɫɤp t͡ɕɐɫ.p̬ɐɾ.ɢɐ̃n |] [tʰɐ̃ŋ.t̬ɤ sɐ.jɐ̃n ɤ.t̬ɤ̃ːn.ɢɐ |] [ɐ.ʁɤ̃n ø̞ɾ.ɡẽ̞ːn tʰɤ.ʋɐ mẽ̞n ǁ] [qo̞.ʑʊ.mɐː] [mẽ̞n | tʰɤ.ʋɐ mẽ̞n |] [mø̞̃ŋ.ge̞ χɐɾ.ɫɤʁ t̬ɐʁ.nɤ̃ŋ o̞ʁ.ɫʊ mẽ̞n ǁ] [mẽ̞n | tʰɤ.ʋɐ mẽ̞n |] [mø̞̃ŋ.gʏ̃n sʊʁ.ɫʊʁ t͡ɕʊɾt̚.tʰʊ̃ŋ tʰø̞.lʏ mẽ̞n ǁ] [ø̞ɣ.p̬e̞.le̞.ɾɪ̃m t͡ɕʊɾ.tʰʊ̃n.t̬ɐ |] [ø̞l.t͡ɕe̞j tʰɐ.ɾɤp ɪ.ʑẽ̞n.gẽ̞n |] [ø̞t̚.kʏt xø̞ː.me̞j ɤ.ɾɤ̃n.ɢɐ |] [ø̞ː.ɾʏp tʰɐ.ɫɐ̃ːn tʰɤ.ʋɐ mẽ̞n ǁ] [qo̞.ʑʊ.mɐː] [ɐj.mɐq t͡ɕõ̞n.nɐɾ p̬ʏ.le̞.zɪ |] [ɐ.qɤ t̬ʊ̃ŋ.mɐ nɐ.jɤ.ɾɐɫ.t̬ɤʁ |] [t̬e̞p̚.ɕɪl.ge̞.ʑe̞ t͡ɕʏt̚.kʏl.t̬ʏɣ |] [t̬ẽ̞m.nɪɣ t͡ɕʊɾt̚.tʰʊʁ tʰɤ.ʋɐ mẽ̞n ǁ] [qo̞.ʑʊ.mɐː]

English translation

In the most sacred ovaa pass,
I set a stone and I prayed.
Tangdy, Sayan most hallowed,
With white milk, I purified.

Chorus:
I am a Tuvan,
The son of immortal snow-capped peaks.
I am a Tuvan,
The daughter of our homeland's argent creeks.

In the land of my fathers,
Beloved bliss became thine.
Sound of khoomei most divine,
Blessed be my Tuvan line.

Chorus

We are made of holy tribes,
As brothers, friends together we thrive.
For progress as a whole we strive,
As allied Tuvans we live!

Chorus

Russian translation

Одолев перевал священный,
Поднялся я, тувинец,
Обрел из жизни кочевой
лучшую долю я, тувинец.

Припев:
Я – тувинец,
Сын гор с вечными снегами,
Я – тувинка,
Дочь страны серебряных рек.

Мелодией хоомей и хомуса
Разбудил эхом скалы я, тувинец,
В колыбели младенца качая,
Успокоил его плач я, тувинец.

Припев

С новогодним праздником Шагаа
Весну встречаю я, тувинец,
В летнюю ночь на играх шептался
И нашел судьбу свою я, тувинец.

Припев
