= Tuvan Internationale =

Tuvan anthem

Tyva Internatsional
English: Tuvan Internationale
- Tuvan: Тыва Интернационал
- Former national anthem of Tuva
- Music: Traditional
- Adopted: 1921
- Relinquished: 1944
- Succeeded by: Tooruktug Dolgay Tangdym

Audio sample
- file; help

Singing the anthem a cappella

The Tuvan Internationale (Tuvan: Тыва Интернационал, [tʰɯˈʋɑ intʲeɾnɐtsi.ɐˈnɑɫ]; Russian: Тувинский Интернационал) is a socialist song set to a Tuvan traditional melody. It was the national anthem of the Tuvan People's Republic from 1921 to 1944. It is often incorrectly listed as the Tuvan language version of "The Internationale" despite the two songs having almost nothing in common aside from similar names. With a different melody and different lyrics, the only similarity between the two songs is the fact that they are about a Workers' International. Even then, however, The Internationale is about the First International whereas the Tuvan Internationale is about the Third International. The Internationale actually has a Tuvan version.

When the revolutions after the First World War came to a close, communists managed to gain power in only three countries: the Soviet Union, Tuva and Mongolia. After the Soviet Union was formed, it adopted The Internationale as its anthem. In honour of this, composers in Tuva and Mongolia created the Tuvan Internationale and Mongol Internationale. The Mongol Internationale later served as the national anthem of Mongolia from 1924 to 1950.

The song was included on the Huun-Huur-Tu album "60 Horses In My Herd. Old Songs And Tunes Of Tuva".

== Lyrics ==
Tuvan

Кадагааты каргызынга,
Качыгдадып чораан арат
Качыгдалдан чарып алган.
Кайгамчыктыг Интернационал!

Иштикиниң эзергээнге
Эзергэдип чораан арат,
Эзергэктен чарып алган.
Энерелдиг Интернационал!

Бөмбүрзектиң кырынайга
Бүдүүлүкке чораан арат,
Бүрүн эрге тыпсын берген.
Бүзүрелдиг Интернационал!

Үлетпүрчин тараачыннын
Үнүп турар хувускаалын,
Үргүлчү-ле баштап турар.
Үш-ле дугаар Интернационал!

Mongolian Script

ᠺᠠᠳ᠋ᠬᠠ ᠪᠠᠨᠲ᠋ ᠍ ᠤ ᠺᠠᠷ ᠤᠰ ᠤᠨᠭᠠ᠂
ᠺᠠᠴ ᠢᠳᠠᠳ᠋ ᠍ ᠤᠫ ᠴᠢᠷᠠᠨ ᠠᠷᠠᠲ
ᠺᠠᠴ ᠢᠳᠤᠯᠳᠠᠨ ᠴᠢᠷ ᠤᠫ ᠠᠯᠠᠭᠠᠨ᠃
ᠺᠠᠢᠮᠴ ᠤᠺᠲ ᠢ ᠢᠨᠲ᠋ᠧᠷᠨᠠᠼᠢᠤᠨᠠᠯᠦᠱᠢ!

ᠡᠰᠢᠲᠢᠺᠢᠨᠢᠩ ᠡᠽᠧᠷᠭᠢᠩ ᠢᠶ᠎ᠡ
ᠡᠽᠧᠷᠭᠥᠳᠢᠫ ᠴᠢᠷᠠᠨ ᠠᠷᠠᠲ᠂
ᠡᠽᠧᠺᠭᠺᠲ᠋ᠧᠨ ᠴᠢᠷ ᠤᠫ ᠠᠯᠠᠭᠠᠨ᠃
ᠡᠨᠧᠷᠧᠯᠠᠳᠠᠭ ᠢᠨᠲ᠋ᠧᠷᠨᠠᠼᠢᠤᠨᠠᠯ!

ᠪᠥᠮᠪᠦᠷᠵᠧᠺᠲ᠋ᠢᠩ ᠺ ᠤᠷ ᠤᠨᠠᠢᠭ᠎ᠠ
ᠪᠦᠳᠦᠭᠦᠯᠦᠺᠺᠧ ᠴᠢᠷᠠᠨ ᠠᠷᠠᠲ᠂
ᠪᠦᠷᠦᠨ ᠡᠷᠭᠧ ᠲ ᠤᠫᠰ ᠤᠨ ᠪᠧᠺᠭᠧᠨ᠃
ᠪᠦᠵᠢᠷᠧᠯᠠᠳᠠᠭ ᠢᠨᠲ᠋ᠧᠷᠨᠠᠼᠢᠤᠨᠠᠯ!

ᠦᠯᠧᠲ᠋ᠫᠦᠷᠴᠢᠨ ᠲᠠᠷᠠᠭᠠᠴᠢ ᠶᠢᠨ ᠤᠨ
ᠦ ᠨᠦᠫ ᠲᠤᠷᠠᠷ ᠬᠤᠪᠢᠰᠺᠠᠯ ᠤᠨ᠂
ᠦᠷᠡᠭᠦᠯᠴᠦ ᠯᠧ ᠪᠠᠱᠲᠠᠫ ᠲᠤᠷᠠᠷ᠃
ᠦᠱᠢ ᠯᠧ ᠳ᠋ᠤᠭᠠᠷ ᠢᠨᠲ᠋ᠧᠷᠨᠠᠼᠢᠤᠨᠠᠯ!

Transliteration (Note: Based on pan-Turkic romanization and also loosely based on Nicholas Poppe's scientific transliteration of Turkic used by Russian scholars.)

Kadagaatı kargızınga,
Kaçıgdadıp çoraan arat
Kaçıgdaldan çarıp algan.
Kaygamçıktıg Internacional!

Iştikiniñ ezergeenge
Ezergedip çoraan arat,
Ezergekten çarıp algan.
Enereldig Internacional!

Bömbürzektiñ kırınayga
Büdüülükke çoraan arat,
Bürün erge tıpsın bergen.
Büzüreldig Internacional!

Ületpürçin taraaçınnın
Ünüp turar huvuskaalın,
Ürgülçü-le baştap turar.
Üş-le dugaar Internacional!

English translation

From the foreign tyrants,
Suffer proud peasants
Slaughtered by evil.
The alluring Internationale!

Internally strained
The oppressed proud peasants,
Burdened at the expense of the people.
The gracious Internationale!

Global corruption
And ignorant people.
Conveying the complete new ways,
Self-reliant Internationale!

Proletarian peasants
Making a revolutionary stand.
To last for all-time,
The Third Internationale!

== See also ==
- Tooruktug Dolgay Tangdym
- Mongol Internationale
