= Tuvan akşa =

Currency of the Tuvan People's Republic

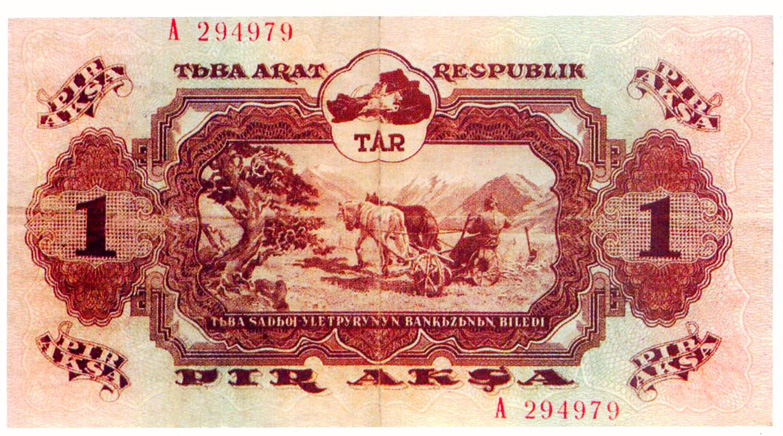
- Banknote of the Tannu Tuva 1 akşa (obverse)
- Plural: The language(s) of this currency do(es) not have a morphological plural distinction.

Denominations
- Subunit
- 1/100: kɵpejek
- Banknotes: 1, 3, 5, 10, 25 akşa
- Coins: 1, 2, 3, 5, 10, 15, 20 kɵpejek

Demographics
- User(s): Tuvan People's Republic

Issuance
- Central bank: Central Bank of Tannu Tuva
- This infobox shows the latest status before this currency was rendered obsolete.

The akşa was the currency of the Tuvan People's Republic (Tannu-Tuva) between 1934 and 1944 and was equal to the Soviet ruble upon introduction. It was subdivided into 100 kɵpejek (cf. kopeck). Akşa in the Tuvan language (akça in many other Turkic languages) simply means "money".

== History ==
Prior to the introduction of the akşa, Tuva issued overprinted Russian and Soviet banknotes. The first series (issued in 1924) was overprinted with denominations in lan, with the number of lan equal to the face value of the (otherwise obsolete) Russian notes. The second series (issued 1933) carried overprints on Soviet notes in rubles and chervonets.

Coins were issued in 1934 in denominations of 1, 2, 3, 5, 10, 15 and 20 kɵpejek, a Tuvanized name for the Russian kopeck, with banknotes issued in 1935 and 1940 in denominations of 1 to 25 akşa. The names kɵpejek and akşa are spelled in Jaꞑalif.

Shortly after the Tuvan People's Republic was absorbed into the Soviet Union, the akşa was replaced by the ruble, with 1 akşa = 3.5 rubles.

=== Coins ===
On the obverse of the coins - the name of the state (Tuvan: TЬBA ARAT RESPUBLIK) and the issuing bank (Tuvan: TЬBA SADЬƢ-YLETPYRNYꞐ BANKЬZЬ).

On the reverse - the nominal number and in words, the year of issue.

Image	Currency (kɵpejek)	Material	Diameter (mm)	Thickness (mm)	Weight (gr)	Herd	Year of issue
	1	bronze	14		1,4	smooth	1934
	2	bronze	18		2,1	smooth	1933 1934
	3	bronze	22		2,8	smooth	1933 1934
	5	bronze	25		5	ribbed	1934
	10	copper+nickel	17			ribbed	1934
	15	copper+nickel	20			ribbed	1934
	20	copper+nickel	22			ribbed	1934

=== Banknotes ===
Image		Face value (akşa)	Dimensions (mm)	Primary colours
Front side	Downside	Face value (akşa)	Dimensions (mm)	Primary colours
		1		brown
		3		green
		5		blue
		10		red
		25		burgundy

== See also ==
- Akçe
- Manchukuo yuan
- Mengjiang yuan

Preceded by: Soviet ruble Reason: independence Ratio: at par	Currency of Tuva; 1935 – 1944	Succeeded by: Soviet ruble Reason: annexation by the U.S.S.R. Ratio: 1 akşa = 3.50 Soviet rubles
