= Tuvan People's Republic =

Partially recognized socialist republic (1921–1944)

Tuvan People's Republic Тыва Арат Республика (Tuvan)
- 1921–1944
- Top: Flag (1935–1939); Bottom: Flag (1943–1944) Emblem (1943–1944)
- Anthem: Tuvan Internationale (1921–1944); Тыва Интернационал "Tooruktug Dolgay Tangdym" (1944); Тооруктуг долгай таңдым
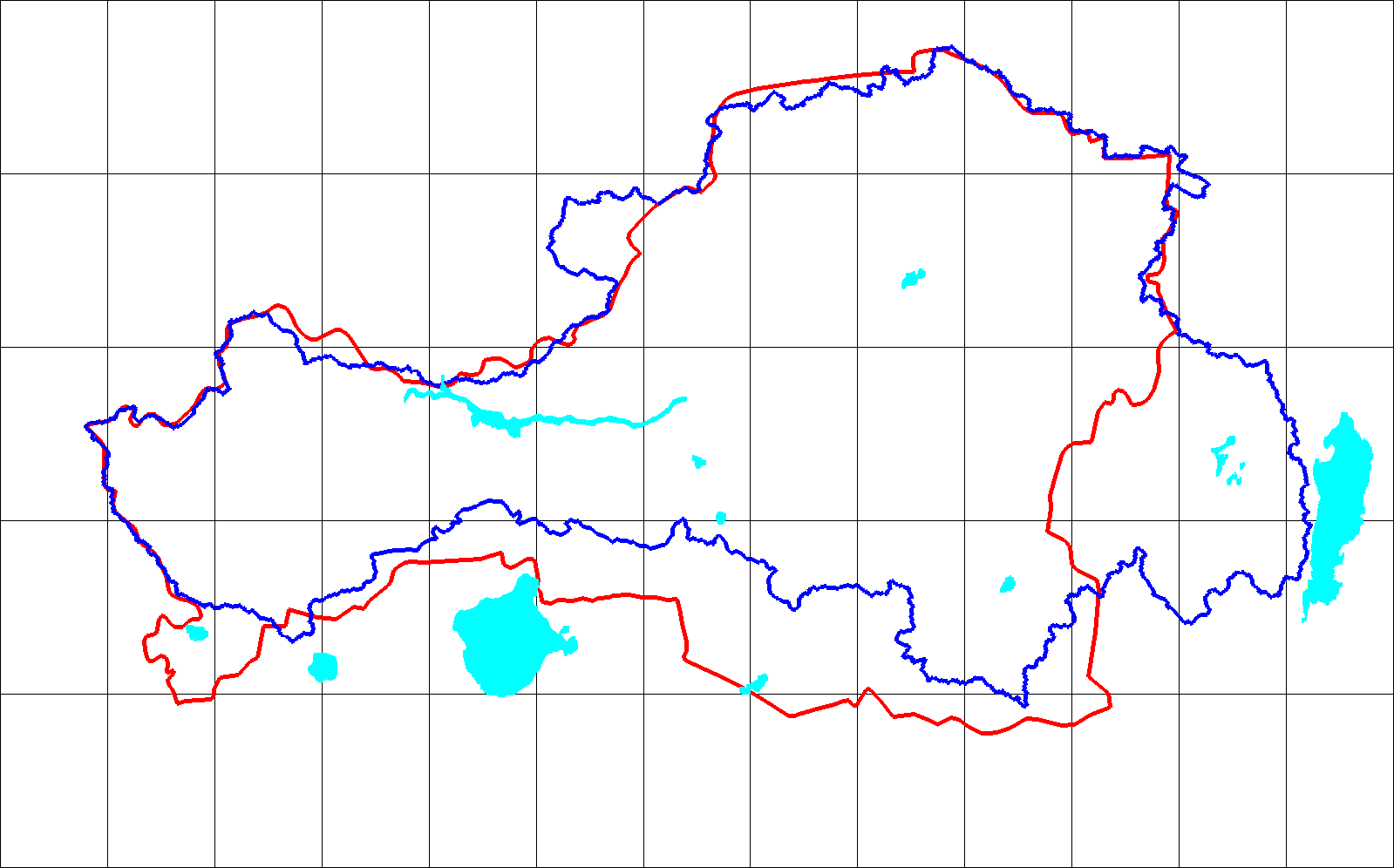
- Blue line is the Uryankhay Krai's border. Red line is the Tuvan People's Republic's border.

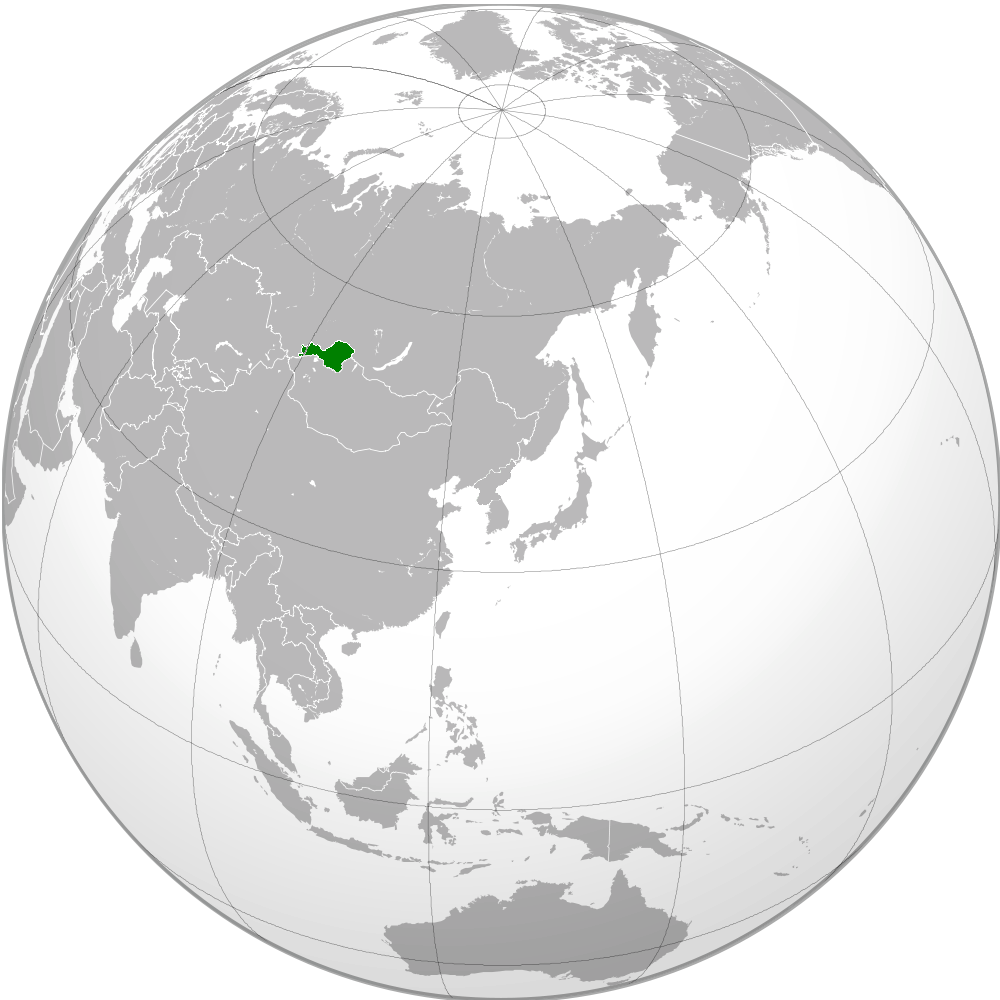
- Location of the Tuvan People's Republic (modern-day boundaries)
- Status: Soviet dependent state
- Capital: Kyzyl; 51.698°N 94.390°E
- Common languages: Tuvan (from 1930 to 1941 based on the New Turkic Alphabet, from 1941 based on the Russian Cyrillic alphabet); Russian; Mongolian; Tibetan
- Religion: State atheism; Tibetan Buddhism; Shamanism; Old Believers; Eastern Orthodoxy
- Government: Communist state
- Party leader
  - 1921–1922 (first): Mongush Nimachap
  - 1932–1944 (last): Salchak Toka
- Head of state
  - 1921–1922 (first): Mongush Buyan-Badyrgy
  - 1940–1944 (last): Khertek Anchimaa-Toka
- Head of government
  - 1923–1924 (first): Mongush Buyan-Badyrgy
  - 1941–1944 (last): Saryg-Donggak Chymba
- Legislature: People's Khural
- Historical era: Interwar period, World War II
  - Independence: 13 August 1921
  - Absorbed by the USSR: 11 October 1944

Area
- 1944: 170,500 km^{2} (65,800 sq mi)

Population
  - 1931: 82,200
  - 1944: 95,400
- Currency: Tuvan akşa
Preceded by
Uriankhai Krai
Russian Occupation
Chinese Occupation
Succeeded by
Tuvan AO
- Today part of: Russia

The Tuvan People's Republic (TPR), (Note: Tuvan: Тыва Арат Республика (ТАР), romanized: Tyva Arat Respublika (TAR), pronounced [tʰɤ.ʋɐ ɐ.ɾɐt ɾes.pub.lɪ.kɐ (tʰe‿a‿eɾ)]) (Note: The name was sometimes partially translated as the Tuvan Arat Republic or the Tuva/Tuvinian Arat Republic (Russian: Тувинская Аратская Республика) and abbreviated TAR.) (Note: Its official name was the Tannu Tuva People's Republic (TRPR) until 1926.) known simply as Tuva, was a partially recognized socialist republic that existed between 1921 and 1944 in North Asia. It was located in the same territory as the former Russian protectorate of Uryankhay Krai, northwest of Mongolia, and now corresponds to the Republic of Tuva, a republic of Russia.

The Soviet Union and Mongolia were the only countries to formally recognize it during its existence, in 1924 and 1926 respectively. After a period of increased Soviet influence, in October 1944, the polity was absorbed into the Russian SFSR (the largest constituent republic of the Soviet Union) at the request of the Tuvan parliament, ending 23 years of independence.

== History ==
=== Establishment ===
Since 1759, Tuva (then called Tannu Uriankhai) had been part of Mongolia, which in turn was a part of the territory of the Manchu Qing dynasty. As the Qing dynasty fell in the Xinhai Revolution of 1911, revolutions in Mongolia were also occurring, leading to the independence of both Mongolia and Tannu Uriankhai. After a period of political uncertainty, the new republic became a protectorate of the Russian Empire in April 1914, known as Uryankhay Krai. After the fall of the Russian Empire in 1917 and the establishment of the Russian Republic, both it and Uryankhay Krai reaffirmed its status as a Russian protectorate.

During the subsequent Russian Civil War, the Whites fought against soldiers sent by the Beiyang government to re-occupy Mongolia and Tuva. The successful Whites then lost to the incoming Bolsheviks and their Mongolian allies. The Bolsheviks had, by December 1920, taken the capital of Khem-Beldyr and had, by March 1921, seized all of Tuva. On 14 August 1921, the "Tannu Tuvan People's Republic" ("Tannu" refers to the Tannu-Ola mountains) declared independence and the newly created Tuvan People's Revolutionary Party (TPRP) became the ruling party. The first chapter of the first constitution of the newborn country stated that "...in international affairs, the state acts under the auspices of Soviet Russia".

=== Early independence ===
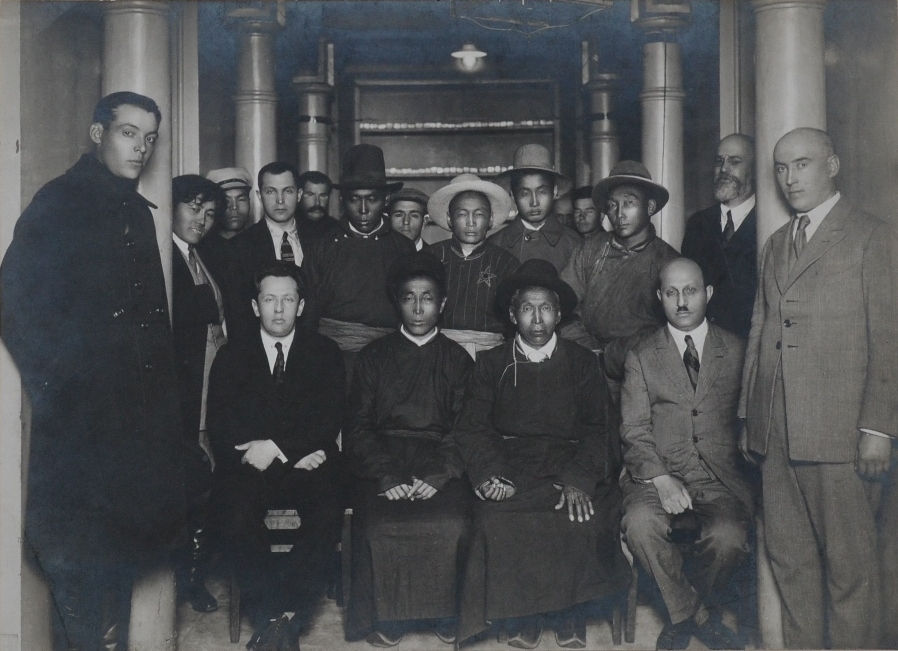
The first official Tuvan delegation to Moscow in June 1925, signing a "Treaty of Friendship and Cooperation between Tuva and the USSR".

In the beginning of February 1922, the first meeting of the TPRP took place and a government was created, which began to work on 3 March the same year. The Soviet-Tuvan border was defined in January 1923 and Red Army divisions on Tuvan territory were withdrawn in accordance with an agreement from 1921. The first Great Khural (People's Congress) was held on 12 October 1923 and, in the second one, on 28 September 1924, a new constitution proclaimed that the country would develop along non-capitalist lines with the TPRP being the only party and the Tuvan section of the Communist International.

In the summer of 1925, the Soviet Union initiated the “Agreement between the Russian SFSR and the Tannu Tuvan People’s Republic on the Establishment of Friendly Relationships”, which was signed by the two countries, strengthening their relations. The treaty stated that the Soviet government "[did] not consider Tannu-Tuva as its territory and [had] no views on it."

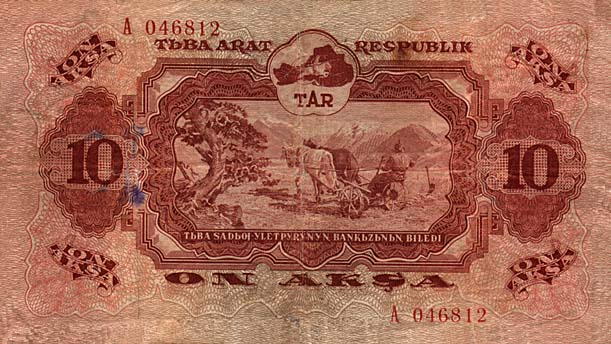
A 10 Tuvan akşa bill, the country's currency

In 1926, the government adopted their first official flag and emblem, changed the name of its capital from "Khem-Beldyr" to "Kyzyl" (meaning "Red"), and the name of the country to simply "Tuvan People's Republic". It also signed a “Treaty of Friendship and Mutual Recognition” with the Mongolian People's Republic, another Soviet satellite state. Much of this work was done by Prime Minister Donduk Kuular, a former Lama monk with strong ties to the country's many lamas. Kuular sought to establish stronger ties with Mongolia and to make Buddhism the state religion while trying to limit Soviet influence and propaganda. The Soviet Union responded with alarm to Kuular's theocratic and nationalist leanings and policies, which were considered in opposition to the communist principles of state atheism and internationalism.

=== Sovietization ===
Kuular's theocratic, nationalist and anti-Soviet policies led to a Soviet-backed coup d'état in 1929. While Kuular was implementing his policies, the Soviet Union had laid foundations for a new leadership – staunchly loyal to Joseph Stalin – including the creation of the "Tuva Revolutionary Youth Union" where members received military training. Five young Tuvan graduates from the Communist University of the Toilers of the East were appointed "Extraordinary Commissioners" and overthrew the government in January 1929 during the 2nd Plenary Session of the Central Committee.

Following the coup, Kuular was removed from power and executed, and about a third to half the members of the TPRP were also purged. Kuular's policies were reverted and the country's traditionally nomadic cattle-breeders were put in collectivization programs. Similarly to the Stalinist repressions in Mongolia, Buddhist lamas, aristocrats, members of the intelligentsia and other political dissidents were purged, and Buddhist temples and monasteries were destroyed. As part of this process, the written language in Tuva was changed from the Mongolian script to the Latin-based alphabet in June 1930. Religious symbols, such as the Khorlo, were also removed from the flag and emblem. Evidence of the effect of these actions can be seen in the decline in the numbers of lamas in the country: in 1929, there were 25 lamaseries and about 4,000 lamas and shamans; in 1931, there were just one lamasery, 15 lamas, and approximately 725 shamans. The attempts at eradicating nomadic husbandry were more difficult. A census in 1931 showed that 82.2% of Tuvans still engaged in nomadic cattle breeding.

One of the five Extraordinary Commissioners, Salchak Toka, became General Secretary of the Central Committee of the TPRP in 1932 and would be the de facto leader of Tuva until his death in 1973.

==== Border dispute with Mongolia ====
In July 1932, with mediation from the Soviet Union, Tuva signed an agreement and received a substantial territorial gain from Mongolia as a fixed border was created between the two countries. Mongolia was forced to sign under Soviet pressure and did not ratify the agreement in the Mongol Great Khural. The new territory notably included Dus-Dag mountain, the only source of salt mining for Tuva. The border between Tuva and Mongolia remained controversial during the 1930s, with Mongolia referring to Qing dynasty documents to argue their ownership of the mountain.

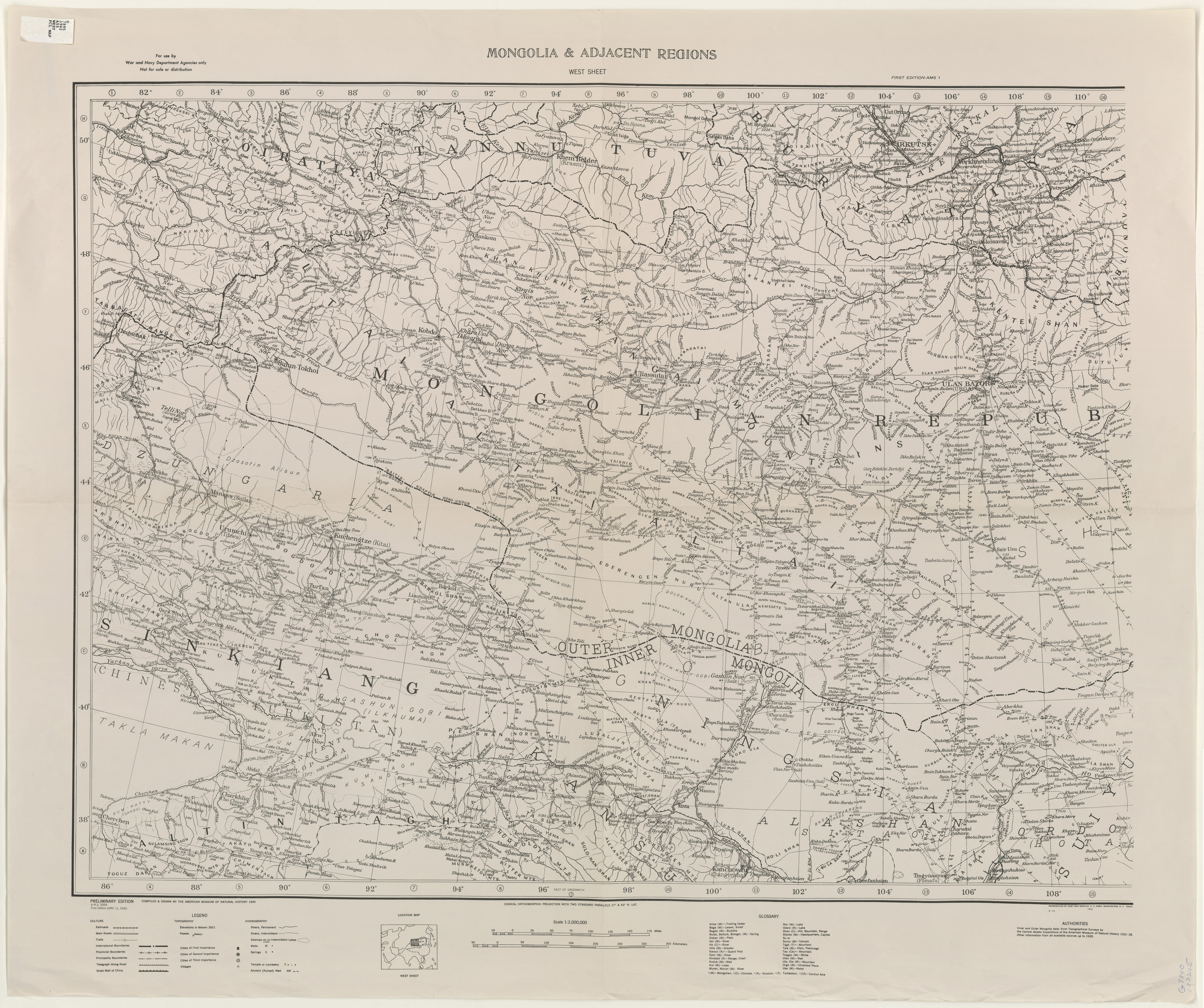
Map of western Mongolia and part of Tannu Tuva in 1935

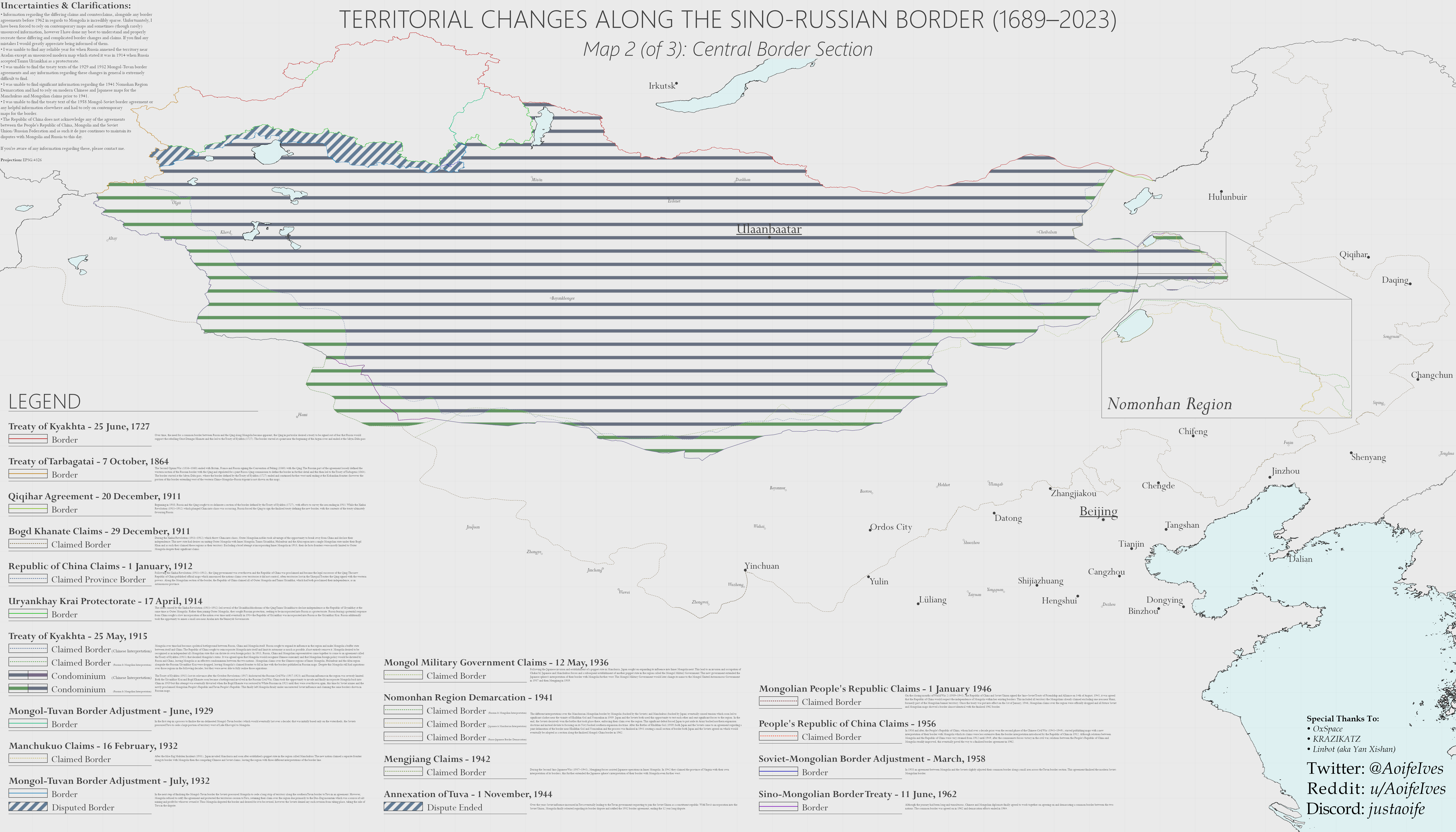
Map of Mongolian-Tuvan border changes

The debate continued to flare up in the following years, and Mongolian leadership demanded the return of the mountain "arbitrarily captured by Tuvans", criticizing the 1932 agreement as unjust due to Soviet pressure for Mongolia to sign. Soviet authorities reiterated their official position that Mongolia had no reason to revise the 1932 agreement and did not need the salt mountain, asking Tuva not to revise the agreement. Mongolia promised not to raise the issue again, but relations between it and Tuva became very strained. The Tuvan government made concessions to avoid conflict with its neighbor, and in 1940, the two governments signed a new agreement "On the border based on historical materials and documents". However, while Tuva sought to clarify the border established in 1932, Mongolia sought to revise it completely; this led to irreconcilable positions and the ratification of the new agreement was stopped.

Both parties turned to the Soviet Union for mediation, but with the outbreak of World War II, Soviet authorities insisted on ceasing any discussion regarding the border dispute, especially in regard to Mount Dus-Dag. In 1943, the Mongolian ambassador said "The Salt Mountain has been exploited by the Tuvans for about ten years now and is also located in disputed territory, so the demand for the Tuvan government to return it is too harsh." This more or less ended the controversial issue, but some minor disputes continued until the absorption of Tuva into the Soviet Union in 1944, at which point Mongolia ratified the original 1932 agreement (and even then, border protection such as alarmed fences had to be introduced in the area in 1946).

=== World War II ===
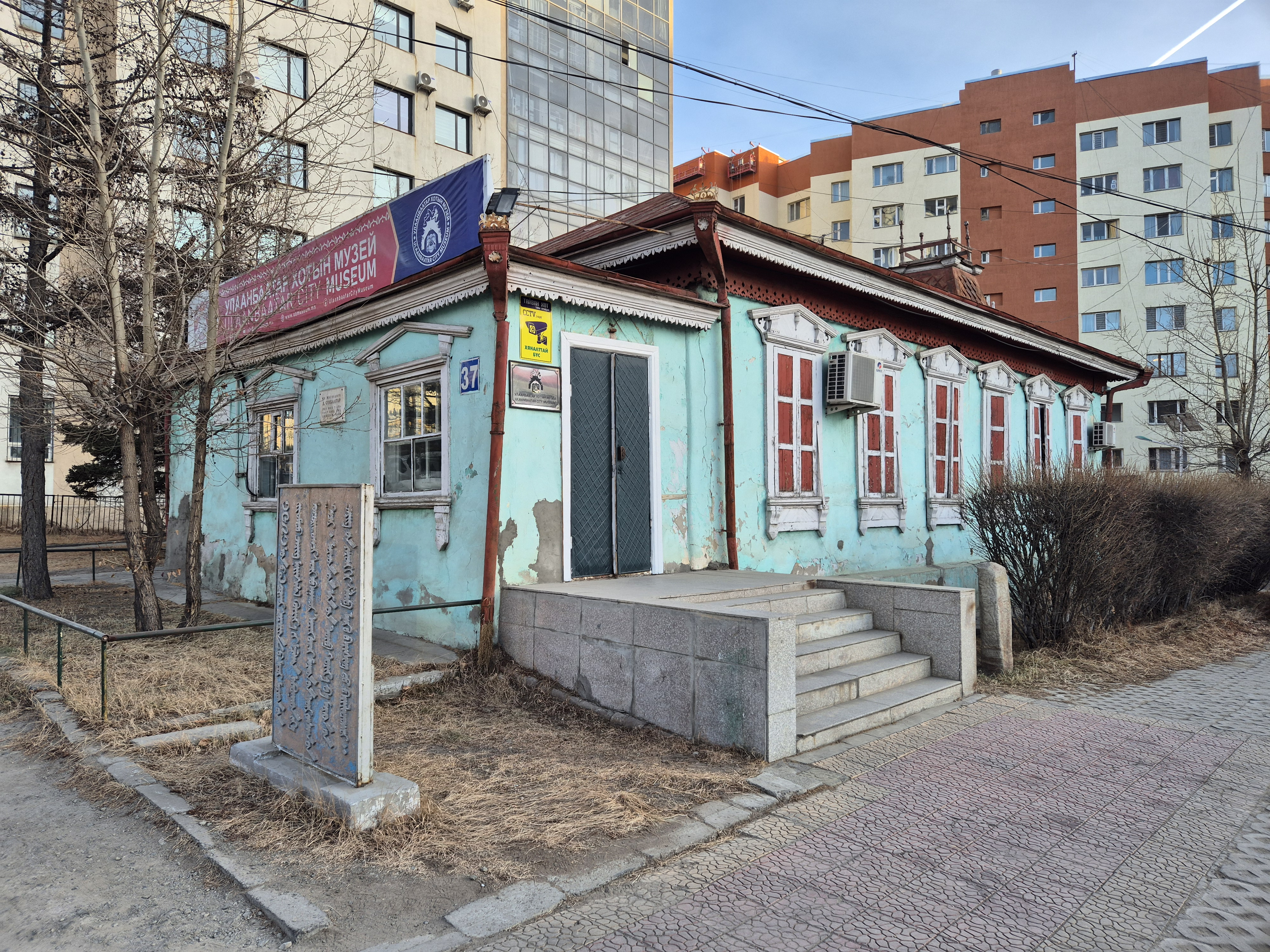
The current building of Ulaanbaatar City Museum in Ulaanbaatar used to house the Embassy of the Tuvan People's Republic in the Mongolian People's Republic.

In the 1930s, the Empire of Japan undertook several aggressive actions against China. This included the invasion of Manchuria and the creation of the Manchukuo puppet state, and culminated in a full-scale war against China in 1937. The Tuvan government undertook measures to strengthen the Tuvan People's Revolutionary Army, and the 11th Congress of the TPRP, held in November 1939, instructed the Central Committee to fully equip the Tuvan Army in the next two to three years and to further raise combat readiness. The Ministry of Military Affairs was created in late February 1940 and immediately started equipping the army with new weapons and equipment, as well as improving training of officers and army units. The Soviet Union assisted the Tuvans with significant assistance in materiel and technical development. The middle-ranking and high-ranking commanders of the Tuvan Army were trained in Soviet military academies, including the Frunze Military Academy and the General Staff Academy.

As Germany and other Axis powers launched their invasion of the Soviet Union on 22 June 1941, the 10th Great Khural of Tuva declared that "The Tuvan people, led by the entire revolutionary party and government, not sparing their lives, are ready by any means to participate in the struggle of the Soviet Union against the fascist aggressor until their final victory over it."

Despite its relatively small size, Tuva helped the Soviet Union in substantial ways, transferring its entire gold reserve of ~20,000,000 Rbls to the Soviet Union, with additional extracted Tuvan gold worth around 10,000,000 Rbls annually. Between June 1941 and October 1944, Tuva supplied the Soviet Red Army with 700,000 livestock, of which almost 650,000 were donated. In addition, 50,000 war horses, 52,000 pairs of skis, 10,000 winter coats, 19,000 pairs of gloves, 16,000 boots and 67,000 tons of sheep wool as well as several hundreds tons of meats, grain, carts, sledges, horse tacks and other goods totaling 66,500,000 Rbls were sent. Up to 90% were donated.

In March 1943, 10 Yakovlev Yak-7 fighters were built with funds raised by the Tuvans and placed at the disposal of the Soviet Air Forces. Also during 1943, Tuva mustered 11 volunteer tankers and 208 volunteer cavalrymen. The tankers and 177 of the cavalrymen were assigned to the Red Army and served on the Eastern Front from early 1944, especially around Ukraine.

=== Absorption into the USSR ===
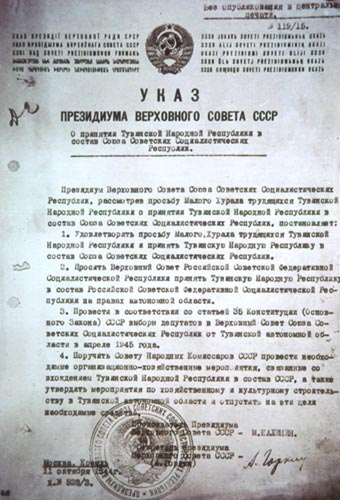
Decree "On the Admission of the Tuvan People's Republic to the USSR", issued on 11 October 1944.

Tuvan orientation towards Moscow intensified during the war. In September 1943, the written language was again changed, this time from the Latin to the Cyrillic script, the standard alphabet in the Soviet Union. By 1941, the national symbols, such as the flag and emblem, had been changed to the same style as various Soviet regions. Tuva then underwent intense Sovietization of society as well as economy, resulting in the virtual eradication of those who opposed Stalinist policies. The Soviets desired the mineral resources of the republic and a permanent end to Mongolian-Chinese geopolitical intrigues in the region. This process culminated in the absorption of Tuva in 1944, under the rule of General Secretary Salchak Toka and his wife, Head of State Khertek Anchimaa-Toka.

On 7 August 1944, the Central Committee of the TPRP decided to subsume Tuva into the Soviet Union. This was supported on 15 August by the 9th Plenary Session. On 17 August, the 7th Extraordinary Session of the Little Khural created a "Declaration of the Accession of the Tuvan People's Republic to the Soviet Union". Finally, on 11 October 1944, at a meeting of the Presidium of the Supreme Soviet, Khertek Anchimaa-Toka read out the declaration detailing the desire for Tuva to join the USSR, which was accepted. The decision went into effect on 1 November 1944, and the Tuvan People's Republic thus became the Tuvan Autonomous Oblast, a part of the Russian SFSR (the largest constituent republic of the Soviet Union).

Salchak Toka's position changed from "General Secretary of the TPRP" to "First Secretary of the Oblast Committee of the CPSU of the Tuvan Autonomous Oblast" (changed to "Republican Committee" in 1961) and continued his rule of the region until his death in 1973.

On 10 October 1961, the Tuvan Autonomous Oblast became the Tuvan ASSR, still within the Russian SFSR, and remained so until 1992. The area that was the Tuvan People's Republic is now known as the Tuva Republic within the Russian Federation.

== Population ==
Population of Tuva
	1918	1931	1944	1958
Tuvans	48,000	64,900	81,100	98,000
Russians and other	12,000	17,300	14,300^{a}	73,900
Total	60,000	82,200	95,400	171,900

a. Russian population declined due to the Red Army conscription during World War II.

== See also ==
- List of leaders of Communist Tuva
- Postage stamps and postal history of Tannu Tuva
- Uryankhay Krai
- Tuvan akşa, the national currency.
- Tuva or Bust!, a book by Ralph Leighton about the author and his friend Richard Feynman's attempt to travel to Tuva.
