= Tuvan Autonomous Oblast =

Administrative region of the Soviet Union

Coordinates: 51°30′N 94°51′E

Tuvan Autonomous Oblast Тыва Автономнуг Область (Tuvan) Тувинская автономная область (Russian)
- Autonomous oblast of the Russian SFSR
- 1944–1961
- Flag (1954–1961)

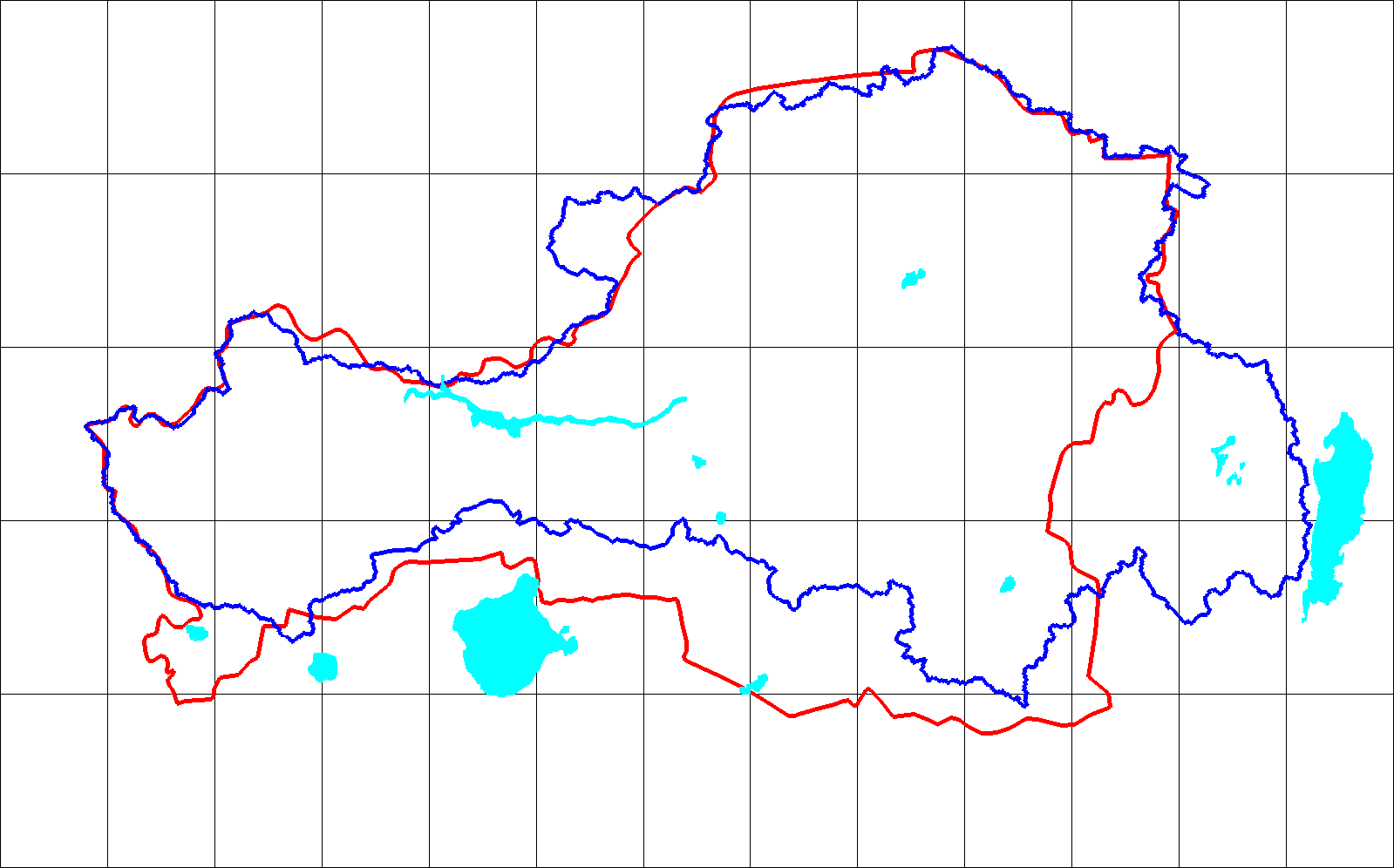
- Blue line is the Uryankhay Krai's border. Red line is the Tuvan Autonomous Oblast border.

Anthem
- "Tooruktug Dolgay Tangdym"; Тооруктуг долгай таңдым
- Capital: Kyzyl
- Demonym: Tuvan
- Area
  - 1959: 170,500 km^{2} (65,800 sq mi)
- Population
  - 1959: 171,928
  - Type: Autonomous oblast
- History
  - Annexation: 11 October 1944
  - Disestablished: 10 October 1961
Preceded by	Succeeded by
Tuvan People's Republic	Tuvan Autonomous Soviet Socialist Republic

The Tuvan Autonomous Oblast (Note: Russian: Тувинская автономная область, romanized: Tuvinskaya avtonomnaya oblast') was an autonomous oblast of the Soviet Union, created on 11 October 1944 following the annexation of the Tuvan People's Republic by the Soviet Union. On 10 October 1961, it was transformed into the Tuvan Autonomous Soviet Socialist Republic (Tuvan ASSR). On 31 March 1992, its successor, the Tuva Republic, became a constituent member of the Russian Federation.

== See also ==
- Tuva
- List of leaders of Communist Tuva
- First Secretary of the Tuvan Communist Party
