= Great Yenisei =

Great Yenisei Большой Енисей
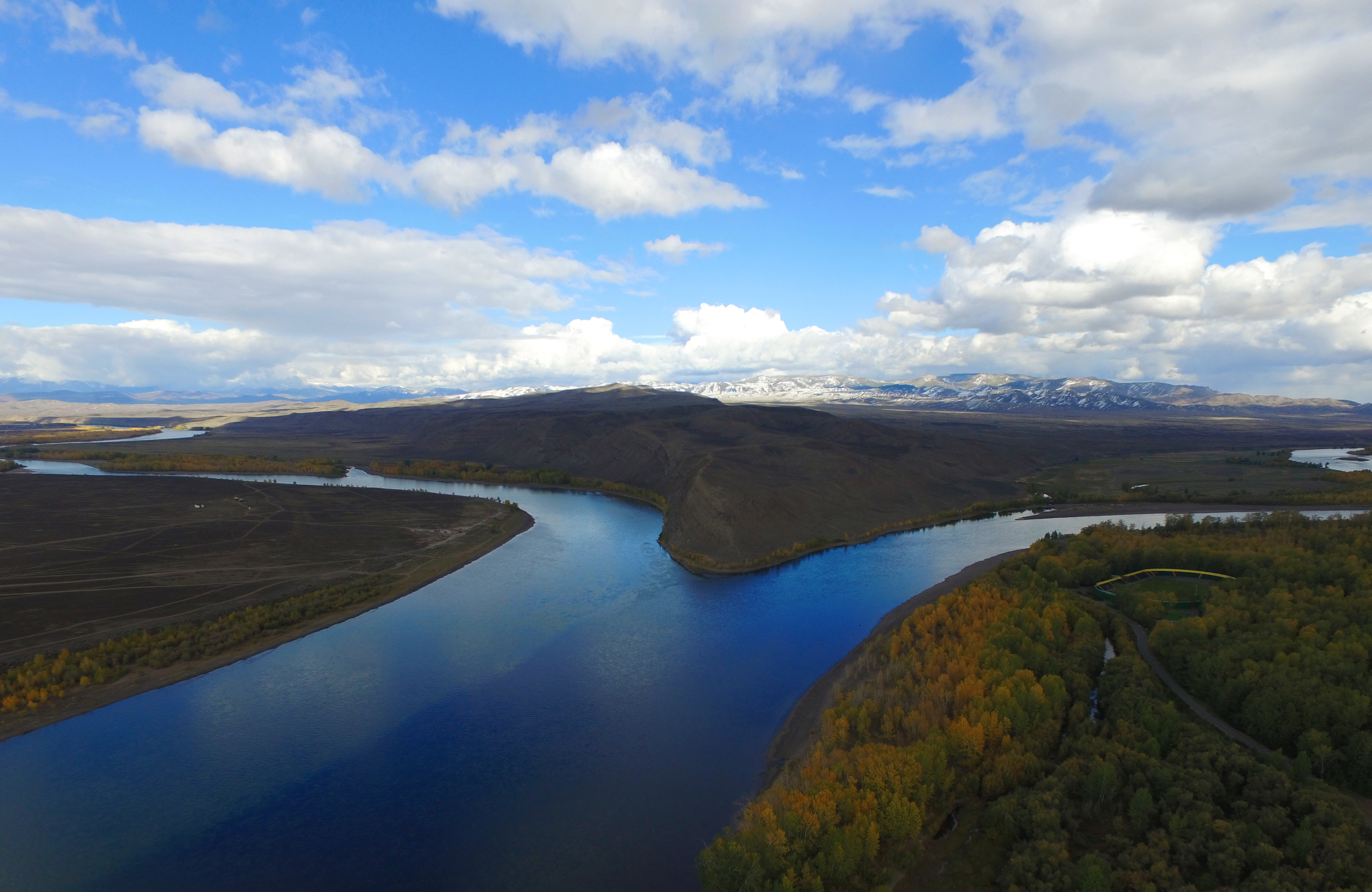
- Confluence of the Great Yenisei (left) and the Little Yenisei.

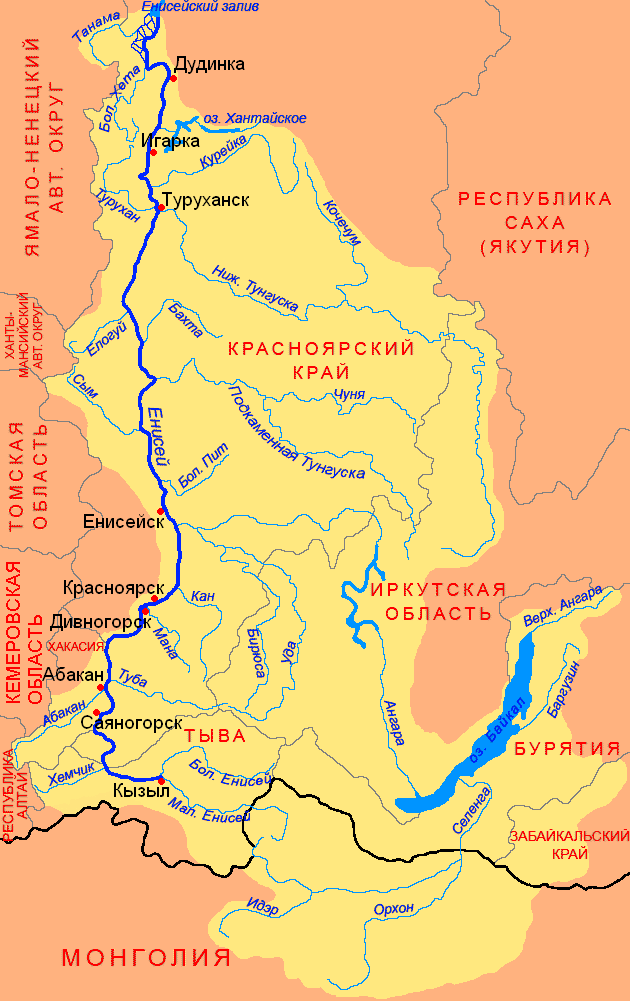
- Basin of the Yeniseyi, Great Yenisei is indicated as Бол. Енисей in the lower left part

Location
- Country: Tuva, Russia

Physical characteristics
- Source
  - location: Lake Kara-Balyk Sayan Mountains
  - coordinates: 52°19′18″N 98°29′32″E
  - elevation: 1,591 m (5,220 ft)
- Mouth: Yenisei
  - location: Kyzyl
  - coordinates: 51°43′42″N 94°27′15″E
  - elevation: 17 m (56 ft)
- Length: 605 km (376 mi)
- Basin size: 56,800 km^{2} (21,900 sq mi)

Basin features
- Progression: Yenisey→ Kara Sea

The Great Yenisei (Russian: Большой Енисей Bolshoy Yenisey; Tuvan: Бии-Хем, romanized: Pî-Xem) is a river in the Republic of Tuva, the right source of the Yenisei, at its confluence with the Little Yenisei.

The name of the river in the Tuvan language, Bii-Khem, literally means 'big river'. (Note: The origins of the term khem (or kem) are unclear. The name kem for rivers is widespread from central Siberia in the east (e.g. the Yenisei tributary), west to Finland (e.g. the Kemi), and was notably a historical name for the Upper Yenisei. The name comes from an ancient word kem or hem, with meaning of "great river", but its linguistic origin is disputed. Various Turkic, Samoyed and Iranian derivations have been proposed, but these have also been disputed. The term survives as a word only in Siberian Turkic languages: in Tuvan as xem (хем), meaning "river" (but only used in the names of rivers) and in its sister language, Tofa, as hem (hем), also meaning "river". These languages are considered to have had close contact with those mentioned above in ancient times. Additionally, there are just over 50 river names containing the suffix -kem -кем in the Altai Republic, and the term kim (ким) as in Kim suğ (Ким суғ), meaning "Yenisei River" also is present in Khakas. All of these instances are confined to the region in and around the present-day Tannu-Tuva.)

== Course ==
The length of the Great Yenisei is 605-kilometre (376 mi), its basin area is 56,800-square-kilometre (21,900 sq mi). The river is navigable for 285-kilometre (177 mi) from the mouth. It flows out of Lake Kara-Balik. High water level of the river is due to the fact that the catchment area of the river includes the Todzha Basin, which relief forms a wide catchment area. The river receives numerous tributaries, the largest of them are right Toora-Khem, Khamsara, Systyg-Khem. The basin of the Bolshoy Yenisei is a mountainous region, which borders in the north and east are the administrative boundaries of Tuva with Buryatia, Irkutsk Oblast and Krasnoyarsk Krai. The river flows through the Tuva basin in its lower course. Near the city of Kyzyl it joins the Kaa-Hem, forming the Ulug-Khem, which is actually the beginning of the Upper Yenisei. The whole Todzhinsky District of the Republic of Tuva is located in the basin of the river, its centre, Toora-Khem, is located at the confluence of the Toora-Khem tributary.

== Protected area ==
The upper course of the river is virtually untouched virgin territory, with the Azas Plateau, including nine extinct volcanoes with unique geological features. A beautiful lake Azas (its other name is Todzha) is located on the Toora-Khem tributary, the lake is one of the tourist sites of the Republic. Almost the entire lake and the area of the river are included in the Azas Federal Reserve.

== See also ==
- List of rivers of Russia
