= Tuvan Autonomous Soviet Socialist Republic =

1961–1992 autonomous republic of the Russian SFSR

Tuvan Autonomous Soviet Socialist Republic Тувинская Автономная Советская Социалистическая Республика (Russian) Тыва Автономнуг Совет Социалистиг Республика (Tuvan)
- ASSR of the Russian SFSR; Republic of the Russian Federation
- 1961–1992
- Flag (1978–1990) Emblem (1978–1992)

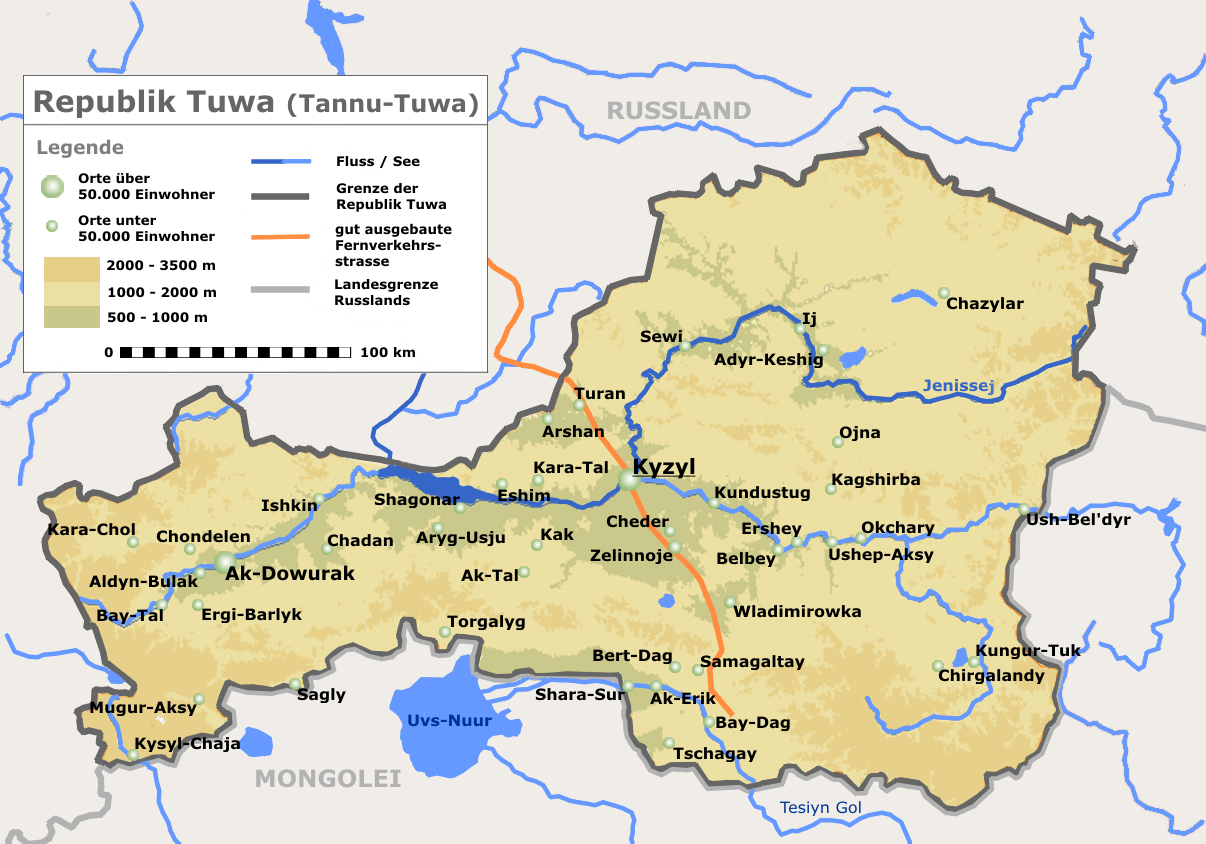
- Map of the Tuva Republic, formerly the Tuvan People's Republic.

Anthem
- "The Forest is Full of Pine Nuts"; Тооруктуг долгай таңдым
- Capital: Kyzyl
- Area
  - 1989: 170,500 km^{2} (65,800 sq mi)
- Population
  - 1989: 309,129
- Government
  - Type: Autonomous republic
- History
  - Established: 10 October 1961
  - Sovereignty declared (Renamed to the Tuvan SSR): 12 December 1990
  - Renamed to the Republic of Tuva: 31 March 1992
- Contained within
  - Country: Soviet Union (1961–1991); Russian Federation (1991–1992)
Preceded by	Succeeded by
Tuvan AO	Tuva

The Tuvan Autonomous Soviet Socialist Republic (Russian: Тувинская Автономная Советская Социалистическая Республика; Tuvan: Тыва Автономнуг Совет Социалистиг Республика), or the Tuvan ASSR (Russian: Тувинская АССР; Tuvan: Тыва АССР), was an autonomous republic of the Russian SFSR. It was created on 10 October 1961 from the Tuvan Autonomous Oblast. Its territory measured 175,000 square kilometers and bordered Mongolia to the south, Buryat ASSR to the east, Gorno-Altai Autonomous Oblast to the west and Khakas Autonomous Oblast to the north.

== History ==
The Tuvan ASSR was awarded the Order of Lenin on 9 October 1964 to commemorate its 20th anniversary of its incorporation into the Soviet Union, as well as the Order of Friendship of Peoples on 29 December 1972 to honor the 50th anniversary of the USSR. The highest organ of government in the Tuvan ASSR was the Supreme Soviet of the Tuvan ASSR, made up of 130 deputies on five-year terms.

=== Dissolution ===
1990 saw the beginning of ethnic clashes between minority Russians and majority Tuvans, although according to Estonian politician and writer Toomas Alatalu, the magnitude of these attacks were largely exaggerated by the Russian media. This came as a result of numerous policies alienating the indigenous population in favor of the minority Russian population, such as the policy of the compulsory admittance of sons of cattle-raisers' children to Russian boarding schools.

According to Alatalu, Tuva had become a bastion of Soviet Conservatism fueled by the strong partocracy which had grown within the small republic, despite ethnic tensions. The Tuvan elections of 1990 was the first time since the incorporation of Tuva into the USSR that all three positions of power within the Tuvan administration were held by ethnic Tuvans. The 1991 Russian presidential election saw Tuva being one of the few autonomous republics to overwhelmingly vote for the Communist Party candidate Nikolai Ryzhkov, with 65% of the vote going to Ryzhkov and 15% for Boris Yeltsin. In 1991 a democratic coalition of forces, including youth leaders and intellectuals, initiated a hunger strike on 27 August, demanding the resignation of the republic's leadership. On 28 August, a meeting of Parliament was called, where Chimit-Dorzhu Ondar, then Chairman of the Supreme Soviet, resigned, and all property of the Communist Party was absorbed by the government. This action led to the dissolution of the Tuvan Autonomous Soviet Socialist Republic. On 31 March 1992, its successor, the Tuva Republic, became a constituent member of the Russian Federation.

== Economy ==
The Tuvan Autonomous Soviet Socialist Republic's economy was mostly composed of two primary sectors, agriculture and mineral extraction, its principal crops were wheat and barley. In contrast to largely indigenous agriculture, Tuvan industry was largely fueled by Russian immigrant labour.

== Demographics ==
Despite Russian immigration and the education system both secondary and post-secondary being carried out almost exclusively in Russian by the 1990s, Tuvans remained the largest ethnicity in Tuva (approximately 206,000 residents were of Tuvan ethnicity, and 98,000 were of Russian ethnicity in 1990). For much of its existence, the Tuvan Autonomous Soviet Socialist Republic was home to numerous prison camps as well as labor colonies.

== See also ==
- Tuva
- List of leaders of Communist Tuva
  - Tuvan Regional Committee of the Communist Party of the Soviet Union

== Notes ==
=== Works cited ===
- Alatalu, Toomas (1992). "Tuva—A State Reawakens". Soviet Studies. 44 (5): 881–95. doi:10.1080/09668139208412051.
