= Tuvan language =

Turkic language spoken in Tuva, Russia

Tuvan
- Тыва дыл Tıva tıl
- Pronunciation: [tʰɤ̀ʋɐ tɤ̀ɫ]
- Native to: Russia, Mongolia, China
- Region: Tuva
- Ethnicity: Tuvans
- Native speakers: 252,953 (2020)
- Language family: Turkic: Common Turkic; Sayan Turkic; Steppe Sayan Turkic (Note: Although most Tuvan dialects are classified as Steppe Sayan Turkic, the Tozhu and Tere-Khöl dialects are classified as Taiga Sayan Turkic.); Tuvan
- Writing system: Cyrillic script

Official status
- Official language in: Russia: Tuva

Language codes
- ISO 639-2: tyv
- ISO 639-3: tyv
- Glottolog: tuvi1240 Tuvinian todj1234 Todja
- ELP: Tuva
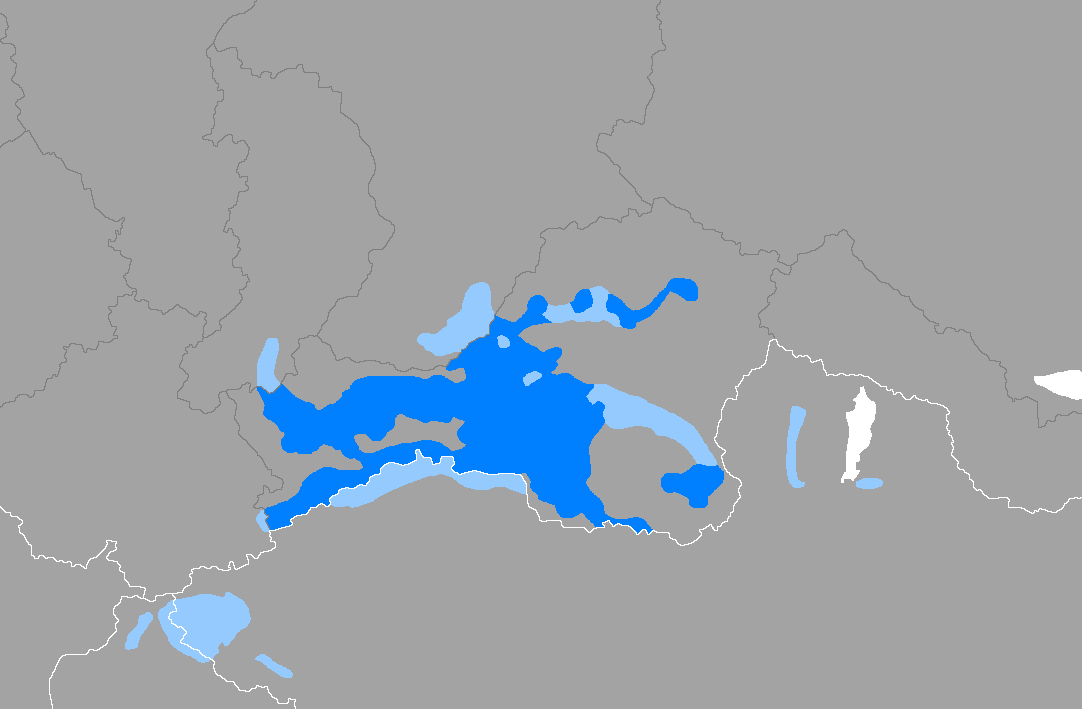
- Distribution of Tuvan in Tuva and surrounding regions

- Tuvan is classified as Vulnerable by the UNESCO Atlas of the World's Languages in Danger.

- People: Tuvan / Tyvans; Тывалар; Тувинцы
- Language: Tuvan / Tyvan; Тыва дыл
- Country: Tuva / Tyva; Тува; Тыва

A Tuvan speaker

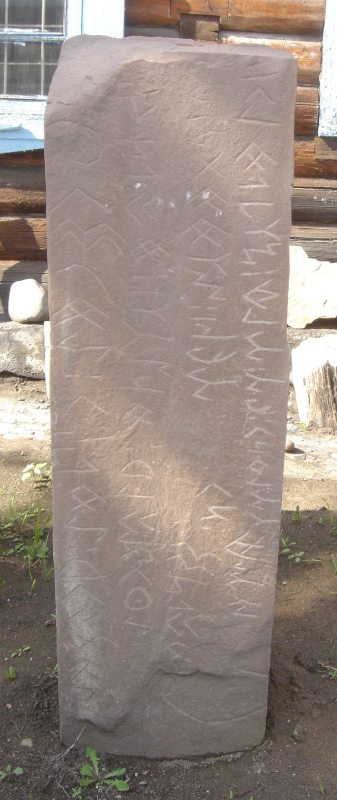
Inscription in Kyzyl using Turkic script

Tuvan, (Note: /ˈtuːvən/ TOO-vən; Russian: Тувинский язык, romanized: Tuvinskij jazyk, IPA: [tʊˈvʲinskʲɪj jɪˈzɨk]) also spelt Tyvan, (Note: Tuvan: Тыва дыл Tıva tıl [tʰɤ̀ʋɐ tɤ̀ɫ]) is a Turkic language spoken in the Republic of Tuva in South Central Siberia, Russia. There are small groups of Tuvans that speak distinct dialects of Tuvan in China and Mongolia.

== History ==
The earliest record of Tuvan is from the early 19th century by Wūlǐyǎsūtái zhìlüè (Chinese: 烏里雅蘇台志略), Julius Klaproth 1823, Matthias Castrén 1857, Nikolay Katanov, Vasily Radlov, etc.

The name Tuva goes back as early as the publication of The Secret History of the Mongols. The Tuva (as they refer to themselves) have historically been referred to as Soyons, Soyots or Uriankhais.

== Classification ==
Tuvan (also spelled Tyvan) is linguistically classified as a Sayan Turkic language. Its closest relative is the moribund Tofa.

Tuvan, as spoken in Tuva, is principally divided into four dialect groups; Western, Central, Northeastern, Southeastern.

- Central: forms the basis of the literary language and includes Ovyur and Bii-Khem subdialects. The geographical centrality of this dialect meant it was similar to the language spoken by most Tuvans, whether or not exactly the same.
- Western: can be found spoken near the upper course of the Khemchik. It is influenced by the Altai language.
- Northeastern, also known as the Todzhi dialect, is spoken near the upper course of the Great Yenisey. The speakers of this dialect utilize nasalization. It contains a large vocabulary related to hunting and reindeer breeding not found in the other dialects.
- Southeastern: shows the most influence from the Mongolic languages.

Other dialects include those spoken by the Dzungar, the Tsengel and the Dukha Tuvans, but currently these uncommon dialects are not comprehensively documented. Different dialects of the language exist across the geographic region in which Tuvan is spoken. K. David Harrison, who completed his dissertation on the Tuvan language in 2001, argues that the divergence of these dialects relates to the nomadic nature of the Tuvan nation.

One subset is the Jungar Tuvan language, originating in the Altai Mountains in the western region of Mongolia. There is no accurate number of Jungar-Tuvan speakers because most currently reside in China, and the Chinese include Tuvan speakers as Mongolians in their census.

== Phonology ==
=== Consonants ===
Tuvan has 19 native consonant phonemes:

Consonant phonemes of Tuvan
		Labial	Alveolar	Palatal	Velar
Nasal		m	n		ŋ
Plosive	lenis (Note: The distinction between initial bilabial and alveolar stops is based on aspiration for most speakers and voicing for the other consonants.)	p	t		ɡ
Plosive	fortis	pʰ	tʰ		k
Affricate			(t͡s) (Note: /f/ and /ts/ are found in some Russian loanwords.)	t͡ʃ	
Fricative	voiceless	(f)	s	ʃ	x
Fricative	voiced		z	ʒ	
Approximant		ʋ	l	j	
Flap			ɾ		

=== Vowels ===
Vowels in Tuvan exist in three varieties: long, short, and short with low pitch. Tuvan long vowels have a duration that is at least (and often more than) twice as long as that of short vowels. Contrastive low pitch may occur on short vowels, and when it does, it causes them to increase in duration by at least a half. When using low pitch, Tuvan speakers employ a pitch that is at the very low end of their modal voice pitch. For some speakers, it is even lower and using what is phonetically known as creaky voice (e.g. [a̰t] 'horse'). When a vowel in a monosyllabic word has low pitch, speakers apply low pitch only to the first half of that vowel (e.g. [àt] 'horse'). That is followed by a noticeable pitch rise, as the speaker returns to modal pitch in the second half of the vowel (e.g. [ǎt] 'horse').

The acoustic impression is similar to that of a rising tone like the rising pitch contour of the Mandarin second tone, but the Tuvan pitch begins much lower. However, Tuvan is considered a pitch accent language with contrastive low pitch instead of a tonal language. When the low pitch vowel occurs in a multisyllabic word, there is no rising pitch contour or lengthening effect: [àt̬ɤ] 'his/her/its horse'. Such low pitch vowels were previously referred to in the literature as either kargyraa or pharyngealized vowels. Phonetic studies have demonstrated that the defining characteristic of such vowels is low pitch. (See Harrison 2001 for a phonetic and acoustic study of Tuvan low pitch vowels.)

In her PhD thesis, "Long Vowels in Mongolic Loanwords in Tuvan", Baiarma Khabtagaeva states that the history of long vowels is ambiguous. While the long vowels may originate from Mongolic languages, they could also be of Tuvan origin. In most Mongolic languages, the quality of the long vowel changes depending on the quality of the second vowel in the conjunction. The only exception to this rule is if the conjunction is labial. The ancient Tuvan languages, in contrast, depended upon the first vowel rather than the second to determine the long vowels.

Khabtagaeva divided the transformation of these loanwords into two periods: the early layer and the late layer. The words in the early layer are words in which the Mongolic preserved the conjunction, the VCV conjunction was preserved but the long vowel still developed when it entered the Tuvan language, or the stress is on the last syllable and a long vowel in the loanword replaced a short vowel in the original word. The late layer includes loanwords in which the long vowel does not change when the word entered Tuvan.

Vowel phonemes of Tuvan
		Short		Long		Low pitch	
		Close	Open	Close	Open	Close	Open
Front	Unrounded	i	e	iː	eː	ì	è
Front	Rounded	y	ø	yː	øː	ỳ	ø̀
Back	Unrounded	ɯ	a	ɯː	aː	ɯ̀	à
Back	Rounded	u	o	uː	oː	ù	ò

Vowels may also be nasalized in the environment of nasal consonants, but nasalization is non-contrastive. Most Tuvan vowels in word-initial syllables have a low pitch and do not contrast significantly with short and long vowels.

==== Vowel harmony ====
Tuvan has two systems of vowel harmony that strictly govern the distribution of vowels within words and suffixes. Backness harmony, or what is sometimes called 'palatal' harmony, requires all vowels within a word to be either back or front. Rounding harmony, or what is sometimes called 'labial' harmony, requires a vowel to be rounded if it is a close vowel and appears in a syllable immediately following a rounded vowel. Open rounded vowels [ø] [o] are restricted to the first syllable of a word, and a vowel in a non-initial syllable may be rounded only if it meets the conditions of rounding harmony (it must both be a close vowel [y] [u] and be preceded by a rounded vowel). See Harrison (2001) for a detailed description of Tuvan vowel harmony systems.

== Writing system ==
=== Cyrillic script ===
The current Tuvan alphabet is a modified version of the Russian alphabet, with three additional letters: Ңң (for IPA /ŋ/, Latin ⟨ng⟩), Өө (for /ø/, Latin ⟨ö⟩), Үү (for /y/, Latin ⟨ü⟩). The sequence of the alphabet follows Russian, but with Ң located after Russian Н, Ө after О, and Ү after У.

А а	Б б	В в	Г г	Д д	Е е	Ё ё	Ж ж
З з	И и	Й й	К к	Л л	М м	Н н	Ң ң
О о	Ө ө	П п	Р р	С с	Т т	У у	Ү ү
Ф ф	Х х	Ц ц	Ч ч	Ш ш	Щ щ	Ъ ъ	Ы ы
Ь ь	Э э	Ю ю	Я я

The letters Е and Э are used in a special way. Э is used for the short /e/ sound at the beginning of words while Е is used for the same sound in the middle and at the end of words. Е is used at the beginning of words, mostly of Russian origin, to reflect the standard Russian pronunciation of that letter, /je/. Additionally, ЭЭ is used in the middle and at the end of words for the long /e/ sound.

The letter ъ is used to indicate pitch accent, as in эът èt 'meat'.

=== Historic scripts ===
==== Traditional Mongolian script ====
From the late 18th century, when Tuva became part of the Qing empire, until the 1930s, all official documentation was kept in Mongolian using the traditional Mongolian script. By the late 1920s less than 1.5% of the total Tuvan population was literate in the traditional Mongolian script. Mongolian literacy was mainly possessed by the feudal nobility and officials. The absolute majority of Tuvans (with the exception of residents of some areas of the south-eastern part of Tuva, where Tuvan-Mongolian bilingualism has been preserved to this day) did not know the Mongolian language, and had long spoken only their native language.

==== Draft scripts ====
In 1926, the government of the Tuvan People's Republic asked Soviet scientists to develop a native Tuvan script. The first draft of a Tuvan alphabet based on Cyrillic was compiled by Roman Buzykaev (1875–1939) and B. Bryukhanov (Sotpa) in 1927. This alphabet contained the letters Аа, Бб, Вв, Гг, Дд, Ёё, Жж, Ӝӝ, Зз, Ии, Йй, Кк, Лл, Мм, Нн, Ҥҥ, Оо, Ӧӧ, Пп, Рр, Сс, Тт, Уу, Ӱӱ, Хх, Чч, Шш, Ыы. The first Tuvan primer was published using this alphabet, but this project was not developed further.

==== Tuvan Latin ====
Example of Latin-based alphabet on the Tuvan People's Republic coat of arms. It says "PYGY TELEGEJNIꞐ PROLETARLARЬ POLGAŞ TARLATKAN ARATTARЬ KATTЬƵЬꞐAR".

The Latin-based alphabet for Tuvan was devised in 1930 by a Tuvan Buddhist monk, Mongush Lopsang-Chinmit (a.k.a. Lubsan Zhigmed). This project was proposed based on the German alphabet, albeit with a modified letter order. In this proposed system, all vowels were placed first (10 letters), followed by consonants (18 letters). This order is characteristic of the classical Mongolian script. Moreover, the pronunciation of several letters underwent significant alteration.

A few books and newspapers, including primers intended to teach adults to read, were printed using this writing system. Lopsang-Chinmit was later executed in Stalinist purges on 31 December 1941.

In the USSR, Aleksandr Palmbach, Yevgeny Polivanov, and Nicholas Poppe were engaged in the development of the Tuvan Latinized alphabet. These researchers utilized the so-called New Turkic Alphabet as a foundation for their work. New Turkic Alphabet was designed with the intention of facilitating unification of writing systems among all Turkic peoples. In early 1930, the Tuvan alphabet was finalized and officially introduced on June 28, 1930, by a decree of the TPR government. The approved Tuvan alphabet was as follows:

A a	B ʙ	C c	D d	E e	F f	G g	Ƣ ƣ
H h	I i	J j	Ɉ ɉ	K k	L l	M m	N n
Ꞑ ꞑ	O o	Ɵ ɵ	P p	R r	S s	Ş ş	T t
U u	V v	X x	Y y	Z z	Ƶ ƶ	Ь ь

The letter Ɉ ɉ was excluded from the alphabet in 1931.

=== Examples ===
Latin	Pirgi tьʙa tьldьꞑ yƶykteri	PYGY TELEGEJNIꞐ PROLETARLARЬ POLGAŞ TARLATKAN ARATTARЬ KATTЬƵЬꞐAR!
Cyrillic	Бирги тыва дылдың үжүктери	Бүгү телегейниң пролетарлары болгаш дарлаткан араттары каттыжыңар!
Common Turkic alphabet	Pirgi tıva tıldıñ üjükteri	Pügü telegeyniñ proletarları polgaş tarlatkan arattarı kattıjıñar!
English	First Tuvan language alphabet	All the world's workers and oppressed peoples, unite!

By September 1943, this Latin-based alphabet was replaced by a Cyrillic-based one, which is still in use to the present day. In the post-Soviet era, Tuvan and other scholars have taken a renewed interest in the history of Tuvan letters.

=== Transliteration ===
For bibliographic purposes, transliteration of Tuvan generally follows the guidelines described in the ALA-LC Romanization tables for non-Slavic languages in Cyrillic script. Linguistic descriptions often employ the IPA or Turcological standards for transliteration.

== Grammar ==
Tuvan builds morphologically complex words by adding suffixes. For example, теве teve is 'camel', тевелер teveler is 'camels', тевелерим tevelerim is 'my camels', тевелеримден tevelerimden is 'from my camels'.

=== Nouns ===
Tuvan marks nouns with seven cases: nominative, genitive, accusative, dative, ablative, locative, and allative. The suffixes below are in front vowels, however, except -Je, the suffixes follow vowel harmony rules. Each case suffix has a rich variety of uses and meanings, of which only the most basic ones are shown here.

Root	Allomorphs			
When after:	voiceless	nasals	voiced/vowel	After -л
Nominative	-∅			
Genitive (-NIŋ)	-тиң (-tiŋ)	-ниң (-niŋ))		-диң (-diŋ)
Accusative (-NI)	-ти (-ti)	-ни (-ni)		-ди (-di)
Dative (-KA)	-ке (-ke)	-ге (-ge)		
Locative (-DA)	-те (-te)	-де (-de)		
Ablative (-DAn)	-тен (-ten)	-ден (-den)		
Allative I (-Je)	-че (-če)	-же (-že)		
Allative II (-DIvA)	-тиве (-tive)	-диве (-dive)		
Plural
Nominative (-LAr)	-тер (-ter)	-нер (-ner)	-лер (-ler)	-дер (-der)
Oblique cases: by adding voiced variant into the plural suffix (-лерниң, -лерге, ...)

Example of declensions
Case	Form	Meaning
Nominative	теве (teve)	"camel"
Genitive	тевениң (teveniŋ)	"of the camel"
Accusative	тевени (teveni)	"the camel" (definite direct object of verb)
Dative	тевеге (tevege)	"for the camel" or "at the camel" (in the past tense)
Locative	теведе (tevede)	"at the camel" or "in the camel"
Ablative	теведен (teveden)	"from the camel" or "than a/the camel"
Allative I	тевеже (teveže)	"to(wards) the camel"
Allative II	теведиве (tevedive)	"to(wards) the camel"

=== Verbs ===
Verbs in Tuvan take a number of endings to mark tense, mood, and aspect. Auxiliary verbs are also used to modify the verb. For a detailed scholarly study of auxiliary verbs in Tuvan and related languages, see Anderson 2004.

=== Syntax ===
Tuvan employs SOV word order. For example, теве сиген чипкен (camel hay eat-PAST) "The camel ate the hay."

== Vocabulary ==
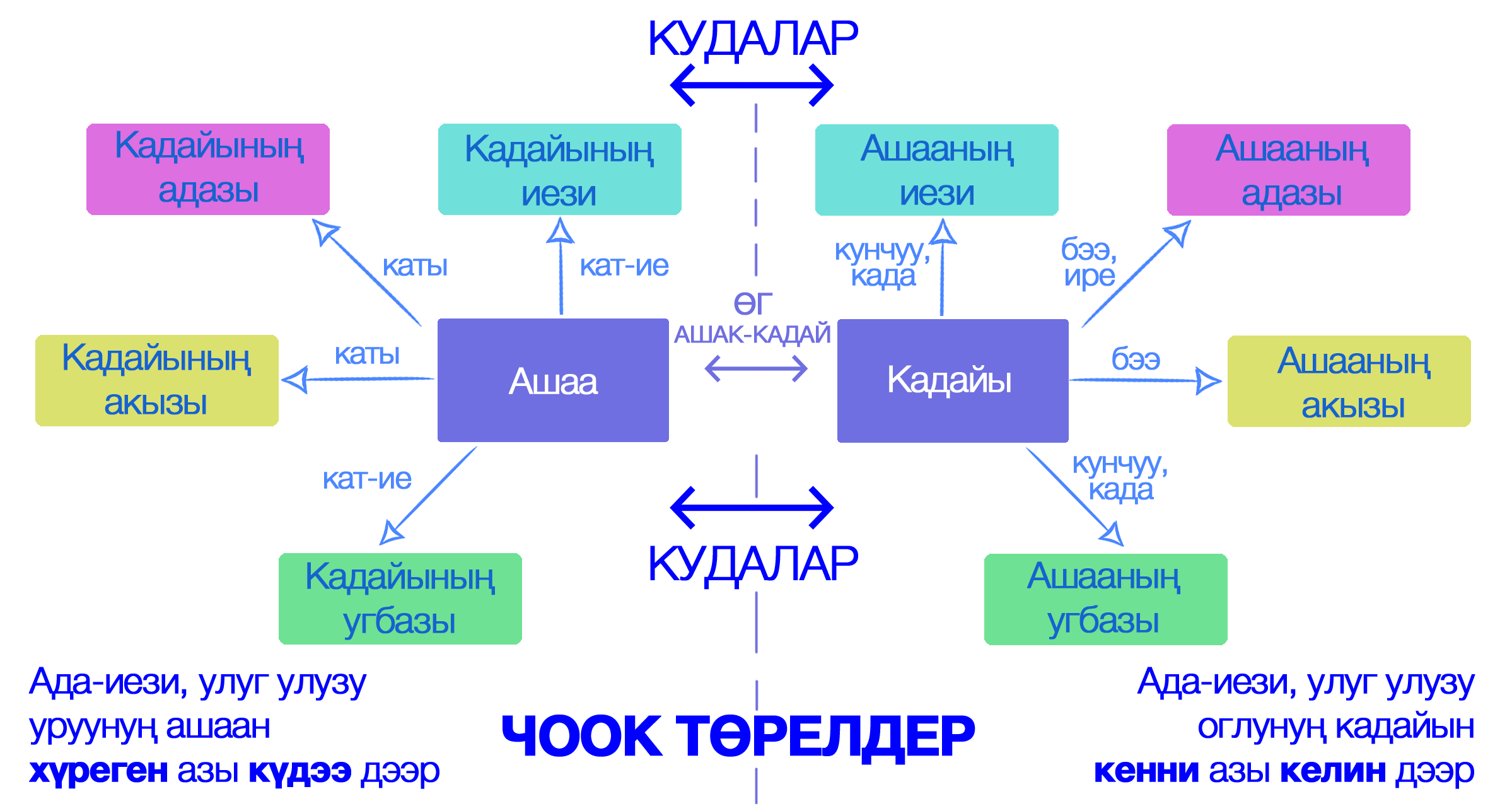
Name of family members in Tuvan

Tuvan vocabulary is mostly Turkic in origin but marked by a large number of Mongolian loanwords. The language has also borrowed several Mongolian suffixes. In addition, there exist Ketic and Samoyedic substrata. A Tuvan talking dictionary is produced by the Living Tongues Institute.

In contrast with most Turkic languages, which have many Arabic and Persian loanwords that even cover some basic concepts, these loanwords are very few, if any, in Tuvan, as Tuvans never adopted Islam like most Turkic peoples.

== Status ==
Tuvans in China, who live mostly in Xinjiang Autonomous Region, are included under the Mongol nationality. Some Tuvans reportedly live at Kanas Lake in the northwestern part of Xinjiang, where they are not officially recognized, and are counted as a part of the local Oirat Mongol community that is counted under the general PRC official ethnic label of "Mongol". Oirat and Tuvan children attend schools in which they use Chakhar Mongolian and Mandarin Standard Chinese, native languages of neither group.

== Sources ==
- Tuvan Talking Dictionary.
- Harrison, K. David (2001). Topics in the Phonology and Morphology of Tuvan (PDF) (Doctoral thesis). Yale University. OCLC 51541112.
- Mänchen-Helfen, Otto (1992) [1931]. Journey to Tuva. Translated by Alan Leighton. Los Angeles: Ethnographic Press University of Southern California. ISBN 978-1-878986-04-7.
- Mongush, M. V. (1996). "Tuvans of Mongolia and China". International Journal of Central Asian Studies. 1: 225–243.
- Todoriki, Masahiko (等々力 政彦) (2011). 最古の可能性のあるトゥバ語語彙について [On the earliest possible Tuvan vocabulary]. Bulletin of the Institute for Advanced Studies on Asia (Thesis). Institute for Advanced Studies on Asia, The University of Tokyo. pp. 238–220. hdl:2261/43632. ISSN 0563-8089.
