= Mongush Buyan-Badyrgy =

Tuvan politician (1892–1933)

- Моңгуш Буян-Бадыргы
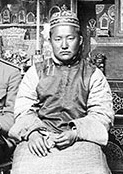

Chairman of the General Central Council
- In office 16 August 1921 – February 1922
- Preceded by: Office established
- Succeeded by: Maady Lopsan-Osur

Chairman of the Council of Ministers
- In office c. October 1923 – 1924 or 1925
- Preceded by: Office established
- Succeeded by: Soyan Oruygu

General Secretary of the Tuvan People's Revolutionary Party
- In office October 1925 – September 1927
- Preceded by: Office established
- Succeeded by: Sodnam Balchir

Personal details
- Born: 25 April 1892 Ayangaty, Barun-Khemchik, Tannu Uriankhai, Outer Mongolia, Qing China
- Died: 22 March 1932 (aged 39)
- Party: TPRP
- Occupation: Politician; statesman

Mongush Buyan-Badyrgy (Tuvan: Моңгуш Буян-Бадыргы, Russian: Монгуш Буян-Бадыргы; 25 April 1892 – 22 March 1932) was a Tuvan politician and statesman. He was adopted by a noyon (chieftain) as an infant, and between 1907 and 1909 he succeeded his adoptive father in that role. He was the noyon for his kozhuun (administrative division) as the region of Tannu Uriankhai (modern-day Tuva) went from Chinese control to a protectorate of Russia in 1914, known as Uryankhay Krai. He was a leading figure in the protectorate and later chaired the All-Tuva Constituent Council in 1921, which established the region as an independent country, the Tannu Tuva People's Republic (later Tuvan People's Republic).

A top official in the ruling Tuvan People's Revolutionary Party (TPRP), Buyan-Badyrgy became the new country's head of state in 1921. Remaining in that post through 1922, he later served as head of government, general secretary of the TPRP, and held a number of other important roles in the country. Considered a skilled diplomat, he led negotiations with surrounding countries regarding various issues and helped Tuva receive official recognition from the Soviet Union and Mongolia.

In the late 1920s, the increasing promotion of Buddhist theocratic policies by several leading Tuvans including Buyan-Badyrgy drew the irritation of the government of the Soviet Union. In response, the Soviets helped several young Tuvans overthrow the government in 1929. This led to his arrest, and he was executed without trial in 1932. Following the collapse of the Soviet Union, Buyan-Badyrgy has become a revered figure among Tuvans. Several monuments have been built of him and the second-highest honor of the Republic of Tuva is named after him.

== Early life ==
Buyan-Badyrgy was born on 25 April 1892, (Note: This date is given in the modern Gregorian calendar, although at the time Russia was still using Julian calendar dates.) in Ayangaty, near the Ovaalyg-Khemchigesh river, in Barun-Khemchik kozhuun (administrative division), Tannu Uriankhai, then part of China's Qing dynasty. His father was Mongush Nomchug, a poor Arat herdsman with a large family. As an infant, with the consent of his parents, he was adopted by the noyon (chieftain) of Khemchik kozhuun, Khaidyp Uger-Daa, who ruled a third of Tuva's territory. There are several legends about Buyan-Badyrgy's adoption. In one, it is stated that Khaidyp had a dream that near his yurt would be born a boy destined to become the head of state. According to another, on the day of Buyan-Badyrgy's birth, Khaidyp "learned about the birth of a boy with an extraordinary destiny ... while reading sacred books." He went to see if there were any newborns among his subjects and discovered Buyan-Badyrgy, then adopted him by trading (Note: Khovalyg (2007) notes that this was a custom among the Tuvan people at the time.) for him green tea and several cattle. Khaidyp had no children of his own and thus raised Buyan-Badyrgy as the heir to the royal noyon title.

Khaidyp provided Buyan-Badyrgy with a good education. Buyan-Badyrgy was distinguished by his intelligence as he grew up. According to the most common account, presented by Mongush Kenin-Lopsan, Buyan-Badyrgy's adoptive father invited many of the top experts in various languages to teach him and had him study numerous fields including history, astrology, medicine, mathematics, psychology and philosophy. He was taught the Tibetan and Mongolian languages starting at age five and became proficient in them from a young age; he also became a fluent speaker of Sanskrit, Russian and Chinese, in addition to his native Tuvan language. A Buddhist, he was a disciple under the lama Oskal Urjut.

== Noyon and pre-independence Tuva ==
=== Rise to noyon and early years ===
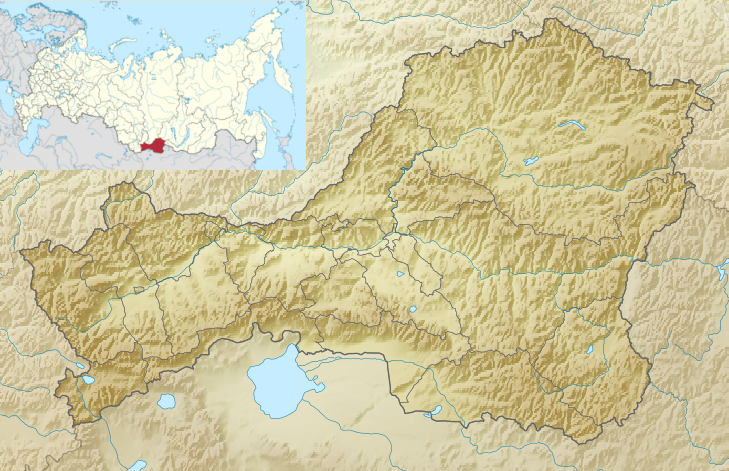
Map of Tuva, including the capital and Buyan-Badyrgy's birthplace. The inset shows Tuva in red on a map of Russia.

Buyan-Badyrgy's adoptive father was praised by Europeans who met him for his "noble character, deep knowledge, and [his] ability to govern." He held the title Uger-Daa, meaning "Promoter of Holiness". Khaidyp started to view the neighboring Russians unfavorably following the Russo-Japanese War, which was fought from 1904 to 1905. Between 1907 and 1909, (Note: Listed differently in various sources: Khovalyg dates it as March 1909; Chorotegin as 1908; Tuva Online as 1907; and 1909 by Tuva.Asia.) he was invited to the city of Usinsk for negotiations with Russians. He was offered an unknown drink when he left the city and when he returned home, according to an eyewitness account, he was ill and his teeth had turned black. He died shortly after; the lama Daryn Shuluu, who examined Khaidyp, declared him to have been poisoned.

After the death of his adoptive father, Buyan-Badyrgy was given the title of gun and succeeded his father as the noyon. He was installed as the noyon in the Mongolian city Uliastai and was between 15 and 17 years old (Note: Identified as 15 by Tuva Online, 16 by Khovalyg, and 17 by Tuva.Asia.) at the time. He became the second-most powerful person in Tuva, behind only amban-noyon (ruler of the entire land) Oyun Kombu-Dorzhu. As noyon, he held authority over the Khemchik kozhuun (Note: Or Daa kozhuun.) region. According to Salimaa Khovalyg, memoirs from contemporary people under his rule and kozhuun political officials depicted him as "a cheerful, intelligent, attentive person who considered it his duty to rule the people according to laws and customs. He was distinguished from other noyons by such qualities as tolerance, a desire for knowledge, [and] respect for knowledgeable people – masters of their craft."

Despite his young age, Buyan-Badyrgy is described by historian Tyntchtykbek Tchoroev as "a natural diplomat who was intelligent, self-confident, flexible, and able to make concessions." In his first years as a noyon, Buyan-Badyrgy followed his adoptive father's policy of maintaining friendly relations with China and opposing Russia: he attempted to stop trade with Russa, and created an army of 2,000 soldiers that protected Chinese trading ports in Tuva. In 1911, a revolution occurred in China which led to the overthrow of the Qing Dynasty, and this resulted in the question arising of the fate of the Tuva region (which was under the rule of China during the dynasty). At the end of the year, the rulers of each kozhuun in Tuva decided to hold a congress. The congress convened in January 1912, and featured varying opinions on what should be done to Tuva. The amban-noyon promoted the idea of joining Russia, with his faction arguing in favor due to the goods that Russian traders had brought, contrasting them with the Chinese who they said left the Tuvans in poverty by not providing sufficient goods.

=== Uryankhay Krai protectorate ===
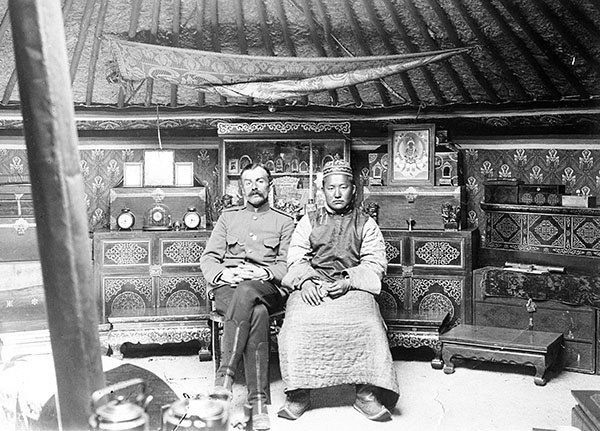
Buyan-Badyrgy in 1914, on the right

Buyan-Badyrgy had initially defended China up through the end of 1911, but he changed his views after the fall of the dynasty and the independence declaration of Outer Mongolia. He began promoting the idea of having Tuva annexed to Mongolia. The congress resulted in the declaration of Tuva as the independent Uryankhay Republic. Later, the leaders of some kozhuuns petitioned for Mongolian citizenship. As the new Chinese government hoped to reintegrate Tuva and Mongolia as part of its territory, most Tuvan leaders, including Buyan-Badyrgy, decided to turn to Russia for protection. On 26 October 1913, Buyan-Badyrgy sent a letter to Nicholas II, the Emperor of Russia:

About three hundred years ago (in 1616), under the first Russian tsar from the currently reigning House of Romanov, Mikhail Fedorovich, our ancestors, who roamed along the Khemchik River, swore allegiance to Russia through the first Russian envoy to this region, Vasily Tyumenets. Now, with the abolition of the Manchu (Qing) dynasty in China and with Mongolia's proclamation of its independence, I and my kozhuun have been left without patronage, and we, the Uriankhs, are still unable to exist independently due to our small numbers. Therefore, I and my spiritual and secular officials and all the people, after a thorough and lengthy discussion of the situation that had arisen, unanimously decided to ask the great Tsagan Khan to accept the entire kozhuun under his high sovereign hand and patronage...

In Buyan-Badyrgy's letter, he also requested the preservation of the Tuvan titles, ranks and positions, that the Russians would not interfere with the Buddhist religion, and the exemption of the Tuvan people from serving in the military. His requests were accepted and on 17 April 1914, Uryankhay Krai was established as a protectorate of Russia. In the new protectorate, seven kozhuuns were formed, each to be led by ukherids. The amban-noyon Oyun Kombu-Dorzhu was overall head of the protectorate and was also tasked with helping Russian settlers move in. By 1917, 12,000 Russians had moved to Tuva, with most settling in the new center of the protectorate, the city of Belotsarsk (now Kyzyl). The plans for the construction of Belotsarsk were coordinated by Buyan-Badyrgy.

Although Tuva was now a Russian protectorate, some of the leading Tuvans still had pro-Mongol or pro-Chinese sentiments, and neither Mongolia nor China renounced previous claims to the region, and both continued to influence Tuvan politics. The entry of Russia into World War I saw more skepticism towards Russia among the Uryankhay Krai's elites, and emboldened figures in the protectorate who sought closer political ties with China. Following the February Revolution in Russia, the new Provisional Government continued to uphold Uryankhay Krai's status as a protectorate, and in August 1917, the Provisional Government established a series of local reorganized governments in Siberia. However, Tsarist rule in Uryankhay Krai did not last long, and the Soviets took the region in March 1918. Soon after, Soviet forces began an ambitious redistribution program in Uryankhay Krai, redistributing livestock herds and the property of prominent Russian merchants.

This decision was met with resistance among the protectorate's elites, who began deepening political and economic ties with Mongolia and China, and invited troops and diplomats from the two countries into the region. The arrival of these troops risked sparking a violent confrontation between the two countries' forces and local Red Army troops, but the Provisional Siberian Government in Omsk soon negotiated the exit of the two countries' forces, and there were no incidents. Later, anti-Soviet efforts in the region by the Chinese proved a convincing success, and the Soviet governance of the protectorate collapsed in July 1918, to be replaced by the Provisional Siberian Government led by Pyotr Vologodsky. Amid these events, Buyan-Badyrgy sought to deepen ties to China. He also was one of the leading negotiators in Tuva, conducting extensive meetings with the Russians about the future of the region. Although many Tuvan political and spiritual elites hoped for annexation to Mongolia, Buyan-Badyrgy began advocating for an independent Tuva. He organized a meeting between Tuvan chieftains which led to the drafting of a constitution for a future independent Tuva.

At a Congress of the Russians in Uryankhay Krai held in the summer of 1918, it was decided that a Soviet power would be established that would recognize the Tuvans and allow them to create their own national state. However, amid the Russian Civil War, several conflicts took place that delayed the independence of Uryankhay Krai. Chinese troops marched into the protectorate in fall 1918, occupying much of the region's southern and western portions. Mongolian troops followed suit soon after, occupying further land in the south. Anti-Russian riots, led by Tuvan officials, broke out in early 1919 which drove out the Provisional Siberian Government. This allowed China and Mongolia to take more control over the region. By 1921, the Soviets had defeated Alexander Kolchak, leader of the opposing White movement in the Civil War, and took control of the region by driving out the Chinese and Mongolians.

== Role in the Tuvan People's Republic ==
=== All-Tuvan Constituent Khural ===
In June 1921, a meeting was held between Buyan-Badyrgy, representing two kozhuuns, and a Russian delegation led by I. G. Safyanov, a representative of the Siberian Revolutionary Committee. They discussed the question of independence for Tuva, with Buyan-Badyrgy stating:

The question of the independence of the region is an old, long-standing sore point ... The Uryankhay people have been fighting for their liberation for many years, but due to their weakness they cannot achieve complete emancipation and as a result of a difficult struggle, having overthrown some, they receive even stronger rapists, more hated. At the present moment, when the Uryankhay people feel strong protection in the person of the Soviet government of Russia, the conditions for self-determination of the people are more favorable than ever.

The discussion resulted in plans for a later meeting in August 1921 to decide the future of Tuva. This occurred with the convening of the All-Tuvan Constituent Khural from 13 to 16 August 1921, described by Khovalyg as "undoubtedly the most significant event in the history of the Tuvan people." The congress featured 63 representatives from seven of the nine kozhuuns, 17 Russian representatives including Safyanov, three Mongolians, and one representative from the Far Eastern Secretariat of the Comintern. Considered the most literate Tuvan leader, Buyan-Badyrgy was elected chairman of the congress. The congress resulted in the declaration of the Tannu Tuva People's Republic (TRPR) as an independent nation, "a free state of a free people, independent of anyone in its internal affairs." Following after the Soviets, Tannu Tuva became a communist state, one of only three in the world in its early years.

At the congress, Buyan-Badyrgy "showed himself to be a cautious, attentive, moderately democratic politician," according to Khovalyg, being an "unconditional supporter of an independent and self-sufficient Tuva." For his role in overseeing the congress, he has been considered one of the founders of the Tuvan state. The congress also created the first constitution for the new People's Republic. Buyan-Badyrgy advocated for the constitution to be similar to prior Tuvan customs and laws. The most debated part of the proposed constitution was the Russians' support for abolishing the use of torture in interrogations, which Buyan-Badyrgy opposed, but eventually announced he would accept. He also played an important role in having the constitution give equality to all citizens; Tuva.Asia described this in 2011 as "a huge achievement – right from a feudal system to a society of democratic norms."

=== Role in the state from 1921 to 1929 ===
After Tannu Tuva was established as an independent state, the government, known as the General Central Council, was created; it included one representative for each kozhuun. Buyan-Badyrgy was named chairman of the council on the suggestion of I. G. Safyanov. Thus, starting on 16 August 1921, he was the Tuvan head of state, as well as acting as the head of government. He was also one of the leaders of the ruling Tuvan People's Revolutionary Party (TPRP) that controlled the government.

Tannu Tuva kept close ties to the Soviet Union after independence. In the country's early years, Buyan-Badyrgy was among the most active promoters of Tuvan sovereignty. He remained the head of state and government until February 1922. Later that year, he became the deputy chairman of the Council of Ministers (the cabinet), and he was also a member of the TPRP's Central Committee. The TPRP party, which he had helped found, was dissolved in 1922, but later reorganized in 1923, with Buyan-Badyrgy rejoining on 25 May 1923. He contributed to the creation of a new Tannu Tuva Constitution in 1923.

On 20 September 1923, Buyan-Badyrgy was in attendance as the First Great Khural (People's Congress) of Tannu Tuva met in Kyzyl. This meeting created new subdivisions for the state, which was divided into six kozhuuns. It also resulted in the abolition of feudal titles and ranks, the creation of Tannu Tuva's financial system and budget, and the levying of taxes to fund the budget. It established a new cabinet of Tannu Tuva that had Buyan-Badyrgy appointed the Chairman of the Council of Ministers, the head of government and a position equivalent to prime minister. In addition to serving as the Chairman of the Council of Ministers, Buyan-Badyrgy also added the role of Minister of Foreign Affairs.

From July to August 1924, Buyan-Badyrgy attended a tripartite conference in Kyzyl of Tuvans, Russians, and Mongolians, which he chaired. This meeting addressed an armed conflict in the Khemchik kozhuun and discussed a proposal by two Tuvan leaders for the state to be annexed to Mongolia. Buyan-Badyrgy staunchly advocated for Tannu Tuva to remain independent and the meeting resulted with the kozhuun conflicts' being resolved and Tannu Tuva remaining independent; after the meeting, the Soviet Union decided to officially recognize the country. This led to the establishment of friendly relations with the Soviet Union in 1925, and Mongolia officially recognized the country in 1926. In September 1924, Buyan-Badyrgy contributed to another new Constitution of Tannu Tuva. Adopted at the Second Great Khural, it proclaimed that the country would develop along non-capitalist lines with the TPRP as the only party and the Tuvan section of the Communist International.

At this point, Buyan-Badyrgy was described by researcher V. A. Dubrovsky as being at peak of his career, with Dubrovsky noting that "due to his natural talent and education, intelligence and foresight ... He enjoyed well-deserved authority among the Tuvans, Russians and Mongols." According to Khovalyg, he was known among contemporaries as a "skillful and purposeful defender of the interests of his people," and was considered a skilled diplomat. In October 1925, the TPRP established a political bureau and the position of TPRP General Secretary; Buyan-Badyrgy was the first to be elected to the latter post. In December, he led the establishment of a youth wing for the TPRP, an idea he had supported several years prior, and gave a welcoming speech at the All-Tuva Khural of the Union of Revolutionary Youth. He was named an honorary revolutionary youth member and was part of the Central Committee of the youth wing.

The first official flag of Tuva, adopted in 1926

Buyan-Badyrgy contributed to the adoption of another new Constitution in 1926, which resulted in the renaming of the Tannu Tuva People's Republic to the Tuvan People's Republic (TPR) and the adoption of the first official flag and emblems. After being re-elected as General Secretary in 1926, Buyan-Badyrgy resigned in September 1927. (Note: Mongush Sendazhievich (2011) describes his being re-elected in 1926 and resiging in September 1927, while Tuva.Asia dates his resignation to 1926.) Despite his resignation, a Comintern representative, S. A. Natsov, still proposed his name for re-election, declaring that: "Comrade Buyan-Badyrgy, working in the leadership of the [TPRP] party, has done and is doing much for the further development of the party. It should be especially noted that a connection with the Communist International has been created, the party has become a member of the Peasant International. Whose merit is all this? All this is the merit of only Comrade Buyan-Badyrgy." He was appointed the Minister of Finance in November 1926, and in this role, he signed a contract for gold exploration and mining with the Russians in August 1927. He also served as the secretary of the Small Khural (parliament) from 1928 to 1929, and during this time, also worked for the Tuvan internal security as head of the investigative department.

During the 1920s, Buyan-Badyrgy was also active in drafting bills in the legislature. He chaired the Tuvan legislative commission and was the author of the state's laws relating to marriage and family. Soviet diplomat A. G. Starkov described Buyan-Badyrgy's impact on Tuva as similar to that of Vladimir Lenin on Russia, while S. A. Natsov said that he was well-known in several countries outside of Tuva including Mongolia and China. A Russian ethnographer, M. G. Levin, who visited the state in 1926, noted that he "stands out from everyone else with his suit, manners, and subtle, intelligent face. Buyan-Badyrgy is a former prince, now the de facto head of state and the leader of a young, growing community."

== 1929 coup, arrest and execution ==
Buyan-Badyrgy was a staunch proponent of Buddhism and an active participant in the All-Tuvan Congress of Lamas. In the mid- and late-1920s, Tuvan head of government Donduk Kuular began an attempt to convert the country to a Buddhist theocracy; his efforts were increasingly irritating to the Soviet government, including Joseph Stalin. This resulted in disputes between what were seen as the "right" – those who were "former princes, high-ranking officials, lamas and wealthy Tuvans," such as Buyan-Badyrgy – and the "left" – those who opposed these Tuvan figures and were supported by the Soviets. The "left" hoped to remove "alien elements" in the TPRP party and showed discontentment towards the views of figures such as Kuular and Buyan-Badyrgy.

Buyan-Badyrgy had previously sent several Tuvan youths to the Communist University of the Toilers of the East. These youths returned in 1929 and, with the assistance of the Soviets and the Comintern, received positions of political authority. Influenced by the Soviets, they then led a coup d'état, with Salchak Toka, one of them, becoming the new leader and bringing about a Sovietization of Tuva. Buyan-Badyrgy was removed from office, expelled from his party, and was forcibly relocated to a different kozhuun.

An armed rebellion took place in Khemchik kozhuun in March 1930, believed to have been started by former Tuvan elites in an alleged attempt to challenge the new government. Shortly after, Buyan-Badyrgy was arrested, without any investigation, on the charge of having organized it as well as another rebellion in 1924. He was imprisoned for two years, likely in Kyzyl. While in prison, he wrote a series of nine elegies, each including the word "sadness" in the title. He expressed grief that those he had sent to the university turned on him, writing in one poem that "The people I taught became the tigers." He wrote of the "sadness of my name" in his last poem, realizing his impending execution, but noted that "The day of exposing lies will certainly come ... And there will be time to glorify my righteousness."

In 1932, the TPRP Political Bureau called Buyan-Badyrgy an "enemy of the people" and alleged his participation in "counter-revolutionary banditry." On 22 March, at age 39, he was executed by firing squad without trial or investigation. Donduk Kuular and several other prominent former Tuvan leaders were executed alongside him.

== Personal life and legacy ==
Buyan-Badyrgy was married. Although he had no children of his own, he adopted three children; one of these was Dembikei, the daughter of an acquaintance. He lived with his family near the Upper Chadan Temple on a river bank. The descendants of his adopted children still live in Tuva.

The Tuvan People's Republic was absorbed into the Soviet Union in 1944. Historians during the Soviet period often viewed Buyan-Badyrgy negatively; however, following the collapse of the Soviet Union, he has become a revered figure in the region, seen for his virtues and as a "true democrat [and] a defender of the interests of the people." He received a partial exoneration in 1994 and a full exoneration in 2007.

Several streets in Tuva are named after him, as well as a local museum. A two-volume book based on Buyan-Badyrgy's life, Buyan-Badyrgy (Russian: Буян-Бадыргы), was published by Mongush Kenin-Lopsan in 2000. A three-act musical drama opera based on the book was composed by Sergey Badyraa and first performed in 2007. In 2012, the government of Tuva established the Order of Buyan-Badyrgy, the second-highest honor in the region (behind the Order of the Republic), and the first recipient was Kenin-Lopsan. In September 2014, a monument was built to him in the capital city of Tuva, Kyzyl, and another monument of Buyan-Badyrgy was erected in 2015. He is included in the State Book "Honored People of Tuva of the 20th Century", an honor equivalent to receiving the Order of the Republic, Tuva's highest award.
