= History of Tuva =

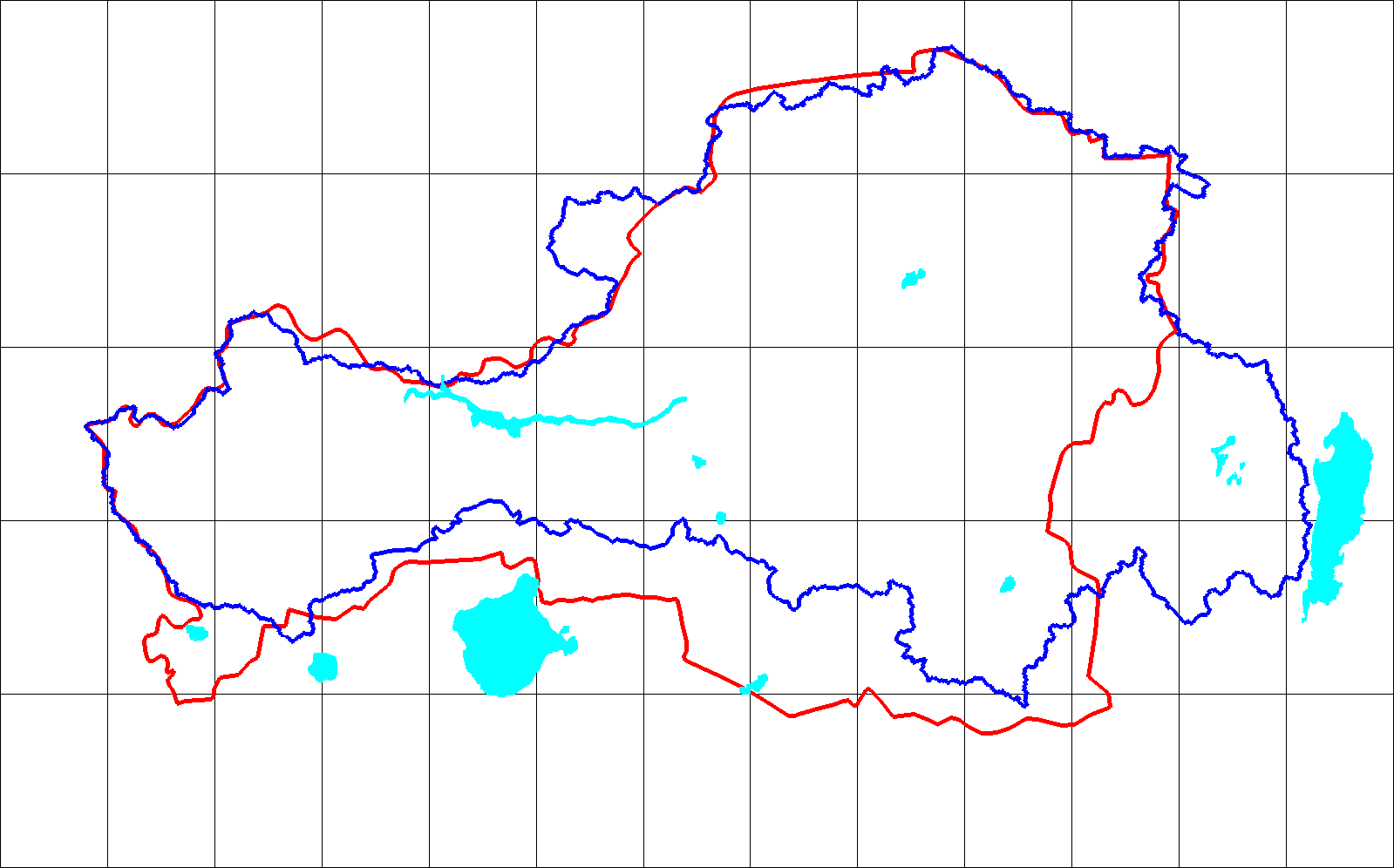
Blue line is the Tannu Uriankhai (1914) border. Red line is the Tuvan Autonomous Oblast (1953) border.

The territory currently known as Tuva has been occupied by various groups throughout its history. Sources are rare and unclear for most of Tuva's early history. Archeological evidence indicates a Scythian presence possibly as early as the 9th century BC. Tuva was conquered relatively easily by the succession of empires which swept across the region. It was most likely held by various Turkic khanates until 1207. It was then ruled by various Mongol-led regimes (including the Yuan dynasty) until the 18th century, when it submitted to the Manchu-led Qing dynasty. Slow Russian colonization during the 19th century led to progressive annexation of the region to Russia in the 20th century. The region was then controlled by the Russian Empire and the Soviet Union before finally joining the Russian Federation in 1992. Throughout this whole time, the borders of Tuva have seen very little modification.

== Early history ==
There are few written sources for the history of Tannu Uriankhai prior to the mid-18th century. Moreover, these sources often do not distinguish between the Tannu Uriankhai, the Altai Uriankhai, and the Altainor Uriankhai. In general, the land has played only a passive role in the history of Inner Asia, passing without much difficulty from one conqueror to another. It was dominated by a series of Turkic khanates of northern Mongolia: Turks, Uighurs and Kirghiz, although it appears that the real Turkification of the region began with the flight of Turkic tribes into this area after the rise of Genghis Khan in the 13th century.

Archeological finds indicate a long occupation of what is now Tuva. Tombs have been found dating as far back as the late Paleolithic Era. Probably the most spectacular Scythian finds known to archaeologists have been discovered in northern Tuva near Arzhaan. Dating to between the 7th and 9th centuries BC they are also among the earliest known, as well as the easternmost. Following restoration in St Petersburg, the sumptuous gold treasure hoard is now on display in the new National Museum in Kyzyl.

The Xiongnu ruled over the area of Tuva prior to 200 AD. The identity of the ethnic core of Xiongnu has been a subject of varied hypotheses and proposals by scholars, including Mongolic and Turkic. At this time a people known to the Chinese as Dingling inhabited the region. The Chinese recorded the existence of a tribe of Dingling origin, named Dubo, in the eastern Sayans. This name is recognized as being associated with the Tuvan people and is the earliest written record of them. The Xianbei defeated the Xiongnu and they in turn were defeated by the Rouran. From around the end of the 6th century, the Göktürks held dominion over Tuva up until the 8th century, when the Uyghurs took over.

The indigenous inhabitants of the present-day Tuva Republic are a Turkic-speaking people of South Siberia, whose language shows strong Samoyedic and Mongolian influences. The name "Tuva" probably derives from a Samoyedic tribe, referred to in 7th-century Chinese sources as Dubo or Tupo, who lived in the upper Yenisei region. These people were known to the Chinese and Mongolians as Uriankhai. Most scholars trace the name to the Uriankhai of the Greater Hinggan Range, a Jurchen people who as a result of extensive migrations gave their name to several peoples living in the region from east Siberia and northeast China to the Altai mountains. These should not be confused with the Altai Uriankhai (ethnic Mongolians living in western Mongolia), the Altainor Uriankhai (a Turkic-speaking people in the Altai Republic within the Russian Federation), and the Khovsgolnor Uriankhai (reindeer herders in the eastern Tuva Republic).

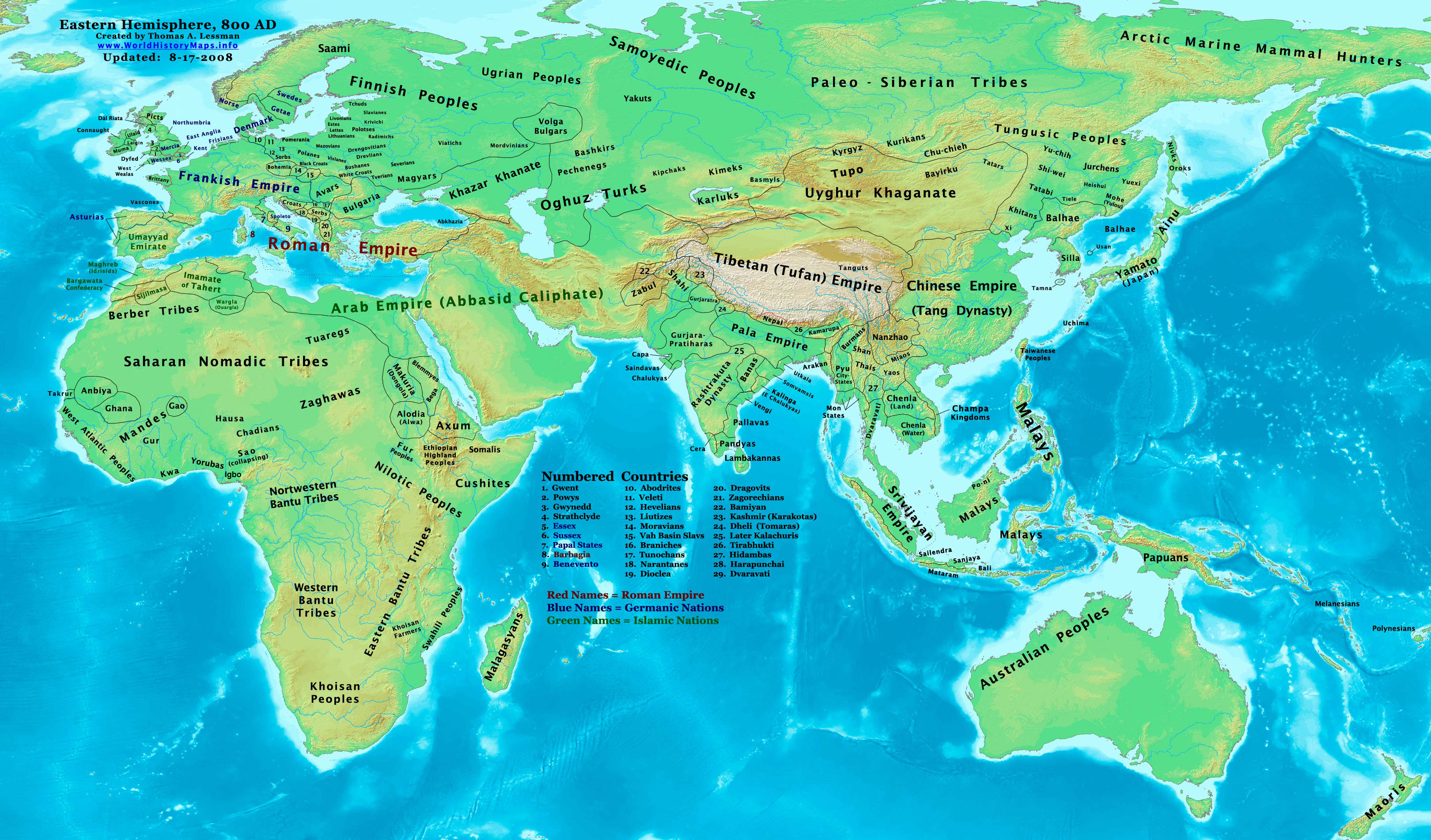
Map showing extent of the Uyghur Khaganate and the location of Kyrgyz in 800 AD.

Tuvans were subjects of the Uyghur Khaganate during the 8th and early 9th centuries AD. The Uyghurs established several fortifications within Tuva as a means of subduing the population. The Uyghur Khaganate was overthrown in 840 AD by a rebellion of the Yeniseian Kyrgyz who came from the upper reaches of the Yenisei. During this period, some Uyghurs were absorbed into Tuvan society. The Kirgiz ruled Tuva until the 13th century.

== Mongol rule ==
In 1207, Tuva was conquered by the Mongols under Jochi, the eldest son of Genghis Khan. This was the beginning of Mongol suzerainty over the Tuvans. Tuvans were ruled by the Khalkha Mongol leader Sholoi Ubashi's Altyn-Khan Khanate until the 17th century.

The state of the Altyn-Khan disappeared due to constant warring between the Oirats and the Khalkha of Jasaghtu Khan Aimak. The Tuvans became part of the Dzungarian state ruled by the Oirats. The Dzungars ruled over all the Sayano-Altay Plateau until 1755.

The historic region of Tannu Uriankhai, of which Tuva is a part, was controlled by the Mongols from 1207 to 1757, when it was brought under the rule of the Qing dynasty, the last dynasty of China, until 1911.

It came under the dominion of the Yuan dynasty of China (1271–1368), and with the fall of the Yuan it was controlled by the Oirats until the end of the 16th and early 17th century. Thereafter, the history of western Mongolia, and by extension Tannu Uriankhai, is a story of the complex military relations between the Altan Khanate (Khotogoit tribe) and the Oirots, both competing for supremacy in western Mongolia. The territory of current Tuva has been ruled by the Xianbei state (93–234), Rouran Khaganate (330–555), Mongol Empire (1206–1271), Yuan dynasty (1271–1368), Northern Yuan dynasty (1368–1691) and Dzungar Khanate (1634–1758).

== Qing rule ==
The Qing dynasty established its dominion over the Khalkhas after intervening in their war against the Oirat. In 1691, the Kangxi Emperor accepted the submission of the Khalkhas at Dolon Nor in modern Inner Mongolia, then personally led an army in 1696 defeating the Oirat under the rule of Galdan. The Khalkha Mongols and their subjects (some Uriankhais) were now under Qing rule, with the Dzungar Empire continuing to control the territory of modern-day Tuva. In 1726, the Yongzheng Emperor ordered the Khotogoit Khan Buuvei Beise to accompany a high Qing official ("amban") to "inform the Uriankhais of [Qing] edicts" in order to prevent "something untoward from happening." Qing subjugation of the Altai Uriankhai and the Altainor Uriankhai occurred much later, in 1754, as part of a broader military offensive against the Dzungar Empire.

=== Tannu Uriankhai ===
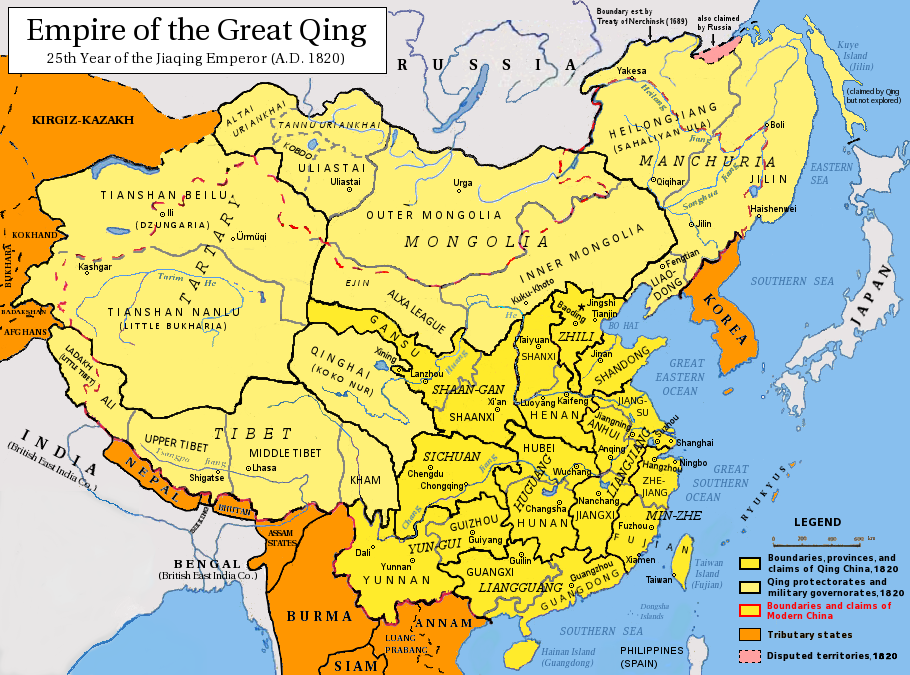
Tannu Uriankhai under the rule of Qing China.

The Tannu Uriankhai were reorganized into an administrative system similar to that of Mongolia, with five khoshuns ("banner") and 46 or 47 sumuns ("arrow") (Chinese and Russian sources differ on the number of khoshuns and sumuns). Each khoshun was governed by an hereditary prince nominally appointed by the Qing military governor at Uliastai. In the latter half of the 18th century, one of the khoshun princes was placed in charge of the others as governor (Mongolian:"amban-noyon") in recognition of his military service to the dynasty.

Tannu Uriankhai (as well as Altai and Altainor Uriankhai) occupied a unique position in the Qing Dynasty's frontier administration system. Qing statutes rigorously defined procedures to be followed by the nobles of Outer and Inner Mongolia, Zungaria, and Qinghai for rendering tribute, receiving government stipends, and participating in imperial audiences. However, they are silent regarding Tannu Uriankhai. After the demarcation of the Sino-Russian border by the Treaty of Kyakhta in 1727, the Qing placed border guards ("yurt pickets," Mongolian: ger kharuul) south of the Tannu-ola Mountains separating Tannu Uriankai from Outer Mongolia, not along the Sayan Mountains separating the region from Russia. This fact was used by 19th-century Russian polemicists, and later Soviet writers, to state that Tuva had historically been "disputed" territory between Russia and China. The Qing military governor at Uliastiai, on his triennial inspection tours of the 24 pickets under his direct supervision, never crossed the Tannu-ola mountains to visit Uriankhai. When problems occurred meriting official attention, the military governor would send a Mongol from his staff rather than attend to the matter himself. After this treaty, inhabitants of Uriankhai without citizenship ties to either side were required to pay taxes to both Russia and China.

Indeed, there is no evidence that Tannu Uriankhai was ever visited by a senior Qing official (except in 1726). Chinese merchants were forbidden to cross the pickets, a law which was not lifted until the turn of the 20th century. Instead, a few days were set aside for trade at Uliastai when Uriankhai nobles delivered their annual fur tribute to the military governor and received their salaries and other imperial gifts (primarily bolts of satin and cotton cloth) from the emperor. Thus, Tannu Uriankhai enjoyed a degree of political and cultural autonomy unequalled on the Chinese frontier.

=== Russian colonists ===
During the 19th century, Russians began to settle in Tuva, resulting in an 1860 Chinese-Russian treaty, in which the Qing Dynasty allowed Russians to settle providing that they lived in boats or tents. Russian gold prospectors came as early as 1838 to mine gold from the upper Systyg-Khem. In the following decades, gold was mined on the Khüt, Öök, Serlig, and northern tributaries of the Bii-Khem and Ulug-Khem. By 1885, almost 9,000 kilograms of gold had been extracted.

In 1881, Russians were allowed to live in permanent buildings. By that time a sizeable Russian community had been established. Their affairs were managed by an official in Russia. These officials also settled disputes and checked on Tuvan chiefs. By 1883, the total number of Russian miners had reached 485.

Russian merchants from Minusinsk followed, especially after the Treaty of Peking in 1860, which opened China to foreign trade. They were lured by the "wild prices", as one 19th-century Russian writer described them, that Tuvans were willing to pay for Russian manufactured goods: cloth, haberdashery, samovars, knives, tobacco, etc. By the end of the 1860s there were already sixteen commercial "establishments" (zavedenie) in Tannu Uriankhai. The Tuvans paid for these goods in livestock-on-the-hoof, furs, and animal skins (sheep, goat, horse, and cattle). But crossing the Sayan Mountains was a journey not without hardships, and even peril; thus, by 1880–85, there were perhaps no more than 50 (or fewer) Russian traders operating in Tannu Uriankhai during the summer, when trade was most active.

Russian colonization followed. It started in 1856 with a sect of Old Believers called the "Seekers of White Waters", a place which according to their tradition was isolated from the rest of the world by impassable mountains and forests, where they could obtain refuge from government authorities and where the Nikonian rites of the Russian Orthodox Church were not practiced. In the 1860s a different kind of refugee arrived, those fleeing from penal servitude in Siberia. More Russians came. Small settlements were formed in the northern and central parts of Tuva.

The formal beginning of Russian colonization in Tannu Uriankhai occurred in 1885, when a merchant received permission from the Governor-General of Irkutsk to farm at present-day Turan. Other settlements were formed, and by the first decade of the 20th century there were perhaps 2,000 merchants and colonists.

By the late 1870s and in the 1880s the Russian presence included a political presence. In 1878, Russians discovered gold in eastern Uriankhai. There were rumors of fabulous wealth to be gained from this area, and the Russian provincial authorities at Yeniseisk received many petitions from gold miners to mine. Permission was granted. Merchants and miners petitioned the Russian authorities for military and police protection. In 1886, the Usinsk Frontier Superintendent was established. Its primary function was to represent Russian interests in Tannu-Uriankhai to Tuvan nobles (not Qing officials) and to issue passports to Russians traveling in Uriankhai. Over the years this office quietly began to unofficially govern at least the Russians in the region, managing taxation, policing, administration, and justice. These powers officially belonged to, but were effectively relinquished by, the Qing. Shortly after the office of Superintendent was created, the Sibirskaya gazeta brought out a special edition, congratulating the government on its creation, and predicting that all Tannu Uriankhai would someday become part of the Russian state.

In general, the Tsarist government was reluctant to act precipitately in Uriankhai for fear of arousing the Qing. It generally preferred a less obvious approach, one that depended on quietly encouraging colonization rather than military action. This fundamentally distinguished ultimate Russian dominion over Tannu Uriankhai from that of Outer Mongolia, with which it has often been compared. In the former, the Russians were essentially colonists; in the latter, they were traders. The Russians built permanent farm houses in Uriankhai, opened land for cultivation, erected fences, and raised livestock. They were there to stay. What gave the Russian presence added durability was its concentration in the northern and central parts of Tannu Uriankhai, areas sparsely populated by the natives themselves. It was Russian colonization, therefore, rather than purposeful Tsarist aggression, that resulted in Tannu Uriankhai ultimately becoming part of Russia in the following century.

=== Qing reaction ===
The Qing government was not oblivious to the Russian presence. In the 1860s and 1870s the Uliastai military governor repeatedly reported the influx of Russians to the Qing. During negotiations leading up to the Treaty of Tarbagatai of 1864 between the Qing and Russia, the Russian representative insisted that all territory to the north of the Qing frontier pickets should belong to Russia. Moreover, the Uliastai military governor obtained a Russian map showing the Tannu-ola Mountains as the Sino-Russian border. These incidents worried the Qing.

But in the second half of the 19th century, the Qing government was distracted by internal problems and could not deal with these issues. Instead, local officials on the frontier were left to manage the Russians as best they could, an impossible task without funds or troops. The military governors at Uliastai could only provide limp protests and inconclusive investigations. In 1909, it was recorded that 9,000 Russians settled in Tannu Uriankhai.

=== Independence ===
By the early 20th century the Uriankhai economy had seriously deteriorated, resulting increased poverty in the region. The causes of this decline were varied: declining number of fur-bearing animals probably due to over-hunting by both Uriankhais and Russians; declining number of livestock as a result of the export market to Siberia; and periodic natural disasters (especially droughts and plagues), which further decreased the livestock populations.

The decline in the number of squirrels also led to marked inflation since Uriankhai trade with Russians was conducted on credit using a complex system of valuation principally pegged to squirrel skins. Furthermore, Russians encouraged credit purchases at usurious rates of interest. If repayment was not forthcoming, Russian merchants would drive off the livestock either of the debtor or his relatives or friends. This resulted in retaliatory raids by the Uriankhai.

Due to Qing policy, ethnic Han traders were kept out of Uriankhai. These policies had actually been applied, unlike in other frontier regions such as Mongolia. In 1902, Han traders were allowed to cross the border in order to break the Russian monopoly of the Uriankhai economy. By 1910, there were 30 or so shops, all branches of Han-owned firms operating in Uliastai. Due to, among other things more aggressive selling, easier credit terms, and cheaper and more popular goods for sale, the Han were soon able to dominate commerce just as they had in Mongolia. Soon, the Uriankhais, commoners and princes alike, had accumulated large debts to Han merchants.

The end of Qing rule in Tannu Uriankhai came quickly. On 10 October 1911, the Wuchang Uprising led to a full-scale revolution to overthrow the Qing, and soon afterwards many Chinese provinces rapidly declared their independence. Outer Mongolia declared its own independence from China on 1 December and expelled the Qing viceroy four days later. In the second half of December bands of Uriankhai began plundering and burning Han-owned shops.

Uriankhai nobles were divided as to the best political course of action. The Uriankhai governor (Mongolian: amban-noyon), Oyun Kombu-Dorzhu, advocated becoming a protectorate of Russia, hoping that the Russians in turn would appoint him governor of Uriankhai. But the princes of two other khoshuns preferred to submit to the new Outer Mongolian state under the theocratic rule of the Jebstundamba Khutukhtu of Urga. There were also nobles who wanted an independent country.

Undeterred, Kombu-Dorzhu sent a petition to the Frontier Superintendent at Usinsk stating that he had been chosen as leader of the independent Tannu Uriankhai state. He asked for protection, and proposed that Russian troops be sent immediately into the country to prevent China from restoring its rule over the region. There was no reply because three months earlier the Tsarist Council of Ministers had already decided on a policy of gradual, cautious absorption of Uriankhai by encouraging Russian colonization. Precipitate action by Russia, the Council feared, might provoke China.

This position changed, however, as a result of genuine concern for the safety of Russian lives and property in Uriankhai, pressure from commercial circles in Russia for a more active approach, and a petition from two Uriankhai khoshuns in the fall of 1913 requesting to be accepted as a part of Russia. Other Uriankhai khoshuns soon followed suit. In April 1914 Tannu Uriankhai was formally accepted as a protectorate of Russia.

Russian interests in Tuva continued into the twentieth century.

== Annexation to Tsarist Russia ==
During the 1911 revolution in China, tsarist Russia encouraged a separatist movement among the Tuvans. Tsar Nicholas II ordered Russian troops into Tuva in 1912, as Russian settlers were allegedly being attacked. Tuva became nominally independent as the Urjanchai Republic before being brought under Russian protectorate as the Uryankhay Kray on 17 April 1914 in the memorandum of Foreign Minister Sergey Sazonov on the question of accepting the population of five khoshuns of the Uryankhai Territory. It was then part of the Yeniseysk Governorate. This move was requested by a number of prominent Tuvans, including the High Lama. A Tuvan capital was established, called Belotsarsk (Белоца́рск; literally, "Town of White Tsar"). Meanwhile, in 1911, Mongolia became independent, though under Russian protection.

Following the Russian Revolution of 1917 which ended the Tsar's rule, most of Tuva was occupied from 5 July 1918 to 15 July 1919 by Aleksandr Kolchak's "White" Russian troops. Pyotr Ivanovich Turchaninov was named governor of the territory. In the autumn of 1918 the southwestern part was occupied by Chinese troops and the southern part by Mongol troops led by Khatanbaatar Magsarjav.

== Communist Tuva ==
From July 1919 to February 1920 the communist Red Army controlled Tuva, but from 19 February 1920 to June 1921 it was occupied by China under governor Yan Shichao. On 14 August 1921 the Bolsheviks (supported by Russia) established the Tuvan People's Republic, popularly called Tannu-Tuva. In 1926, the capital (Belotsarsk; Khem-Beldyr since 1918) was renamed Kyzyl, meaning "Red". Tuva was an independent state between the World Wars.

The state's first communist ruler, Prime Minister Donduk, sought to strengthen ties with Mongolia and establish Buddhism as the state religion. This unsettled the Kremlin, which orchestrated a coup carried out in 1929 by five young Tuvan graduates of Moscow's Communist University of the Toilers of the East. In 1930, the pro-Soviet government began to reform the writing system, first replacing Mongol script with a Latin script, then adopting a Cyrillic script in 1943. Under the leadership of Party Secretary Salchak Toka, ethnic Russians were granted full citizenship rights and Buddhist and Mongol influences on the Tuvan state and society were systematically reduced.

In World War II the state contributed infantry, armored, and cavalry troops to fight against Nazi Germany. Under Soviet command a number of units distinguished themselves and received Tuvan medals.

== Annexation to the Soviet Union ==
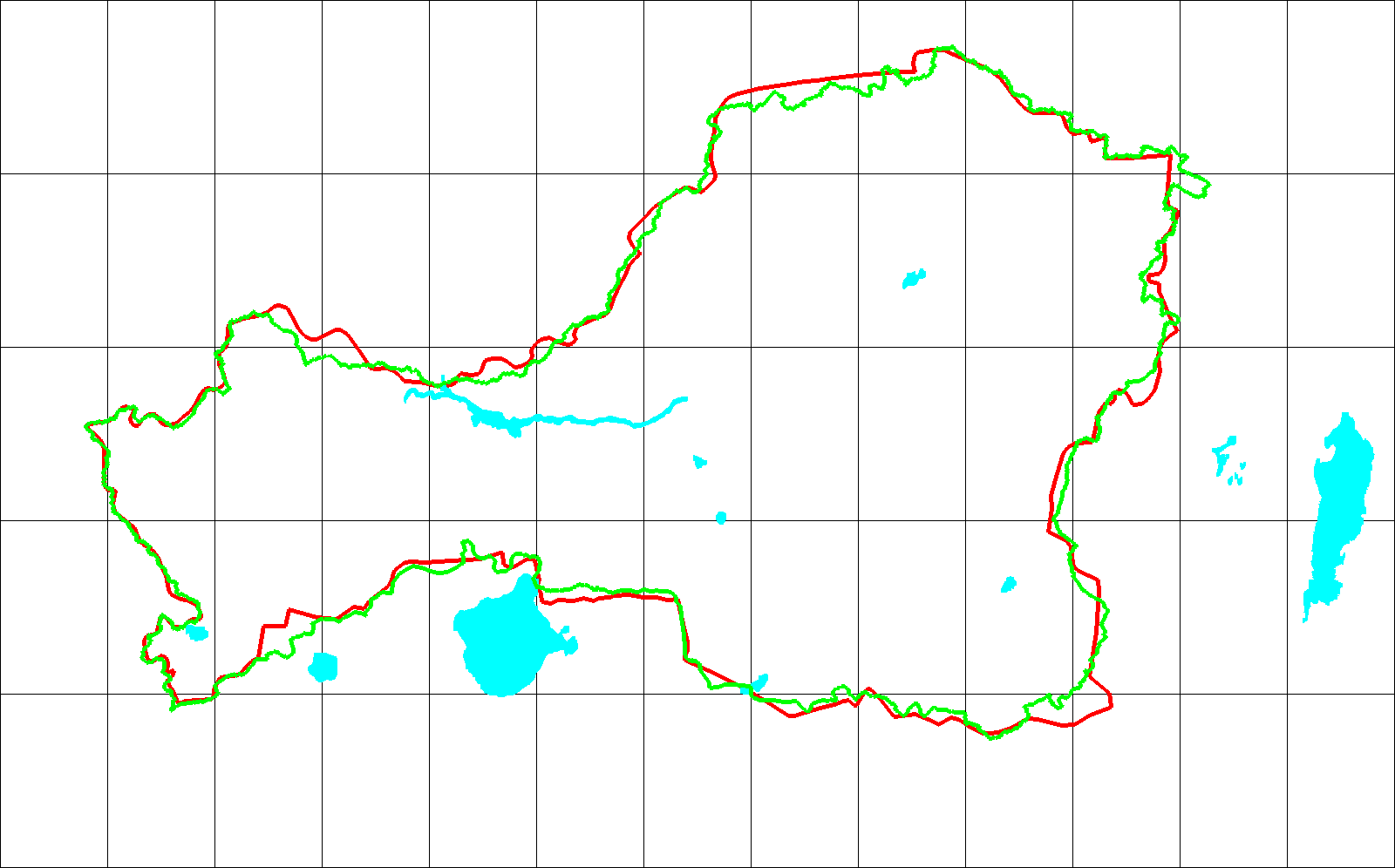
Red line - Tuva 1953 boundaries (before the 1958 Soviet-Mongolian territory exchange agreement). Green line - Tuva 2008 boundaries.

The Soviet Union annexed Tuva outright on 11 October 1944, apparently with the approval of Tuva's Little Khural (parliament), though there was no referendum on the issue. The exact circumstances surrounding Tannu-Tuva's annexation into the USSR in 1944 remain obscure. Salchak Toka, the leader of the Tuvan People's Revolutionary Party, was given the title of First Secretary of the Tuvan Communist Party, and became the de facto ruler of Tuva until his death in 1973. Tuva was made the Tuvan Autonomous Oblast and then became the Tuvan Autonomous Soviet Socialist Republic on 10 October 1961. The Soviet Union kept Tuva closed to the outside world for nearly fifty years.

== Modern history ==
In February 1990, the Tuvan Democratic Movement was founded by Kaadyr-ool Bicheldei, a philologist at Kyzyl University. The party aimed to provide much needed jobs and housing, and also to improve the status of Tuvan language and culture.

Tuva was a signatory to the 31 March 1992 treaty that created the Russian Federation. A new constitution for the republic was drawn up on 22 October 1993. This created a 32-member parliament (Supreme Khural) and a Grand Khural, which is responsible for foreign policy and any possible changes to the constitution, and ensures that Tuvan law is given precedence. The constitution also allowed for a referendum if Tuva ever sought independence. This constitution was passed by 53.9% (or 62.2%, according to source) of Tuvans in a referendum on 12 December 1993.

== See also ==
- Aldy-Bel culture
- History of Kazakhstan
- History of Kyrgyzstan
- History of Mongolia
- History of Siberia
