= Tuva in World War II =

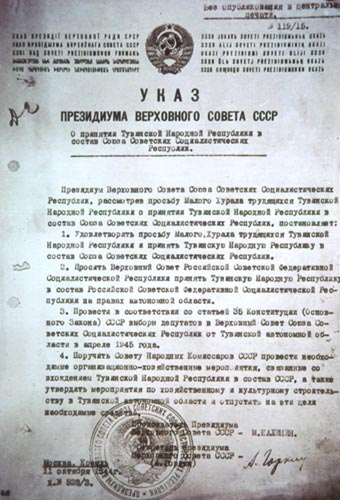
Decree of the Presidium of the Supreme Soviet of the USSR on the entry of Tuva into the USSR as an autonomous oblast, 1944.

The Tuvan People’s Republic entered World War II on the side of the Allied Powers, shortly after the invasion of the Soviet Union by Nazi Germany that broke the non-aggression pact between the Soviet Union and Third Reich.

The Tuva volunteer forces took part in the battles on the eastern front as part of the formations of the Workers and Peasants Red Army. On October 14, 1944, the Tuvan People's Republic became part of the Soviet Union, becoming the Tuva Autonomous Region. From that moment on, the Tuvans participated in hostilities until the end of the Second World War as citizens of the Soviet Union.

== Background ==
=== Formation of the Tuvan People's Republic ===
Until 1912, Tuva, at that time known as the “Tannu-Uryankhai”, was ruled by the Qing dynasty. After the Xinhai Revolution in China, which ended in 1913, Tuvan noyons repeatedly appealed to Russian Emperor Nicholas II to establish a Russian protectorate over Tuva. On April 4, 1914, the emperor gave official consent to accept the Tuvan territories into the Russian Empire as a protectorate, after which Tuva, called the Uryankhay Krai, was annexed to the Yenisei province.

In a short period during which Tuva was part of the Russian Empire, the tsarist government pursued an extremely cautious policy on its territory, as in other national regions of Eastern Siberia, in order to avoid aggravation of Chinese, Japanese and Mongolian influence in them.

In 1919, at the height of the Civil War, the Bolshevik leadership categorically forbade parts of the Red Army to be on the territory of the Uryankhay Krai, which was already not only ordered to remain autonomous, but also planned to be declared independent if pro-Bolshevik-minded forces came to power. In August 1921, after the remnants of Baron von Ungern-Sternberg's Asiatic Cavalry division was defeated by the forces of the Red Army, Soviet Russia began a people's revolution in Tuva. And from August 13 to August 16, the All-Tuvan Constituent Khural of nine kozhuuns took place in the village of Sug-Bazhy Tyndaskin, proclaiming the formation of the Tuvan People's Republic and adopted the first Tuvan constitution.

=== Soviet–Tuvan relations ===
Despite the de jure political independence of the Tuvan People's Republic, the country was largely dependent on the Russian SFSR. Thus, the Soviet delegation, which was present at the All-Tuva Constituent Khural, which proclaimed the republic, insisted on fixing in a special resolution the provision according to which in the sphere of foreign policy of the Tuvan People's Republic should act "under the patronage of the Russian SFSR".

In January 1923, the Soviet–Tuvan border was finally defined. In the same year, the Red Army division, which was present on the Tuvan territory, was withdrawn beyond its borders according to an agreement concluded between the governments of both countries in 1921.

In the summer of 1925, the "Agreement between the RSFSR and the Tuvan People’s Republic on the Establishment of Friendly Relationships" was signed between the USSR and the TPR, which strengthened the allied relations between the states. The initiator of the contract was the USSR. The treaty stated that the Soviet government "does not consider Tannu-Tuva as its territory and has no views on it." In addition, in connection with mutual economic interest, the USSR granted Tuvinian citizens a number of benefits in the areas of movement, trade and residence on Soviet territory, and Tuvans living in the USSR — facilitated border crossing on strictly established areas.

In the late 1920s and early 1930s, the first wave of political repression swept across Tuva. Subsequently, these took place throughout the decade. According to the prosecutor's office of the Republic of Tuva, in the 1930s, 1,286 people were repressed in the TPR, and according to another version, their number reached 1,700 people. Among those subjected to repression, as in the USSR, were many prominent statesmen of Tuva, including the first chairman of the Council of Ministers of the TPR, Mongush Buyan-Badyrgy, and the former chairman of the Presidium of the Small Khural Donduk Kuular. They were accused as spies for Japan and preparing a counter-revolutionary coup. The first secretary of the Central Committee of the Tuvan People's Revolutionary Party, Salchak Toka, which enjoyed the sympathy of the Soviet leadership, acted as the main initiator of political purges in Tuva.

=== Armed forces of Tuva ===
In the 1930s, the Empire of Japan undertook several aggressive actions against China. This included the invasion of Manchuria and creation of the puppet state Manchukuo, and culminating in full-scale war against China in 1937. The Tuvan government undertook measures to strengthen their army and the 11th Congress of the TPRP, held in November 1939, instructed the Central Committee to fully equip the Tuvan People's Revolutionary Army in the next 2–3 years and to further raise combat readiness. The Ministry of Military Affairs was created in late February 1940 and immediately started equipping the army with new weapons and equipment, as well as improving training of officers and army units. The Soviet Union assisted Tuva with significant assistance in materiel and technical development. The middle and high command of the Tuvan Army were trained in Soviet military academies, including the M. V. Frunze Military Academy and the General Staff Academy.

== The War ==
As Germany and other Axis powers launched their invasion of the Soviet Union on 22 June 1941, the 10th Great Khural of Tuva declared that:

"The Tuvan people, led by the entire revolutionary party and government, not sparing their lives, are ready by any means to participate in the struggle of the Soviet Union against the fascist aggressor until their final victory over it"

It is sometimes written that Tuva declared war on Germany on 25 June 1941, but the sources are dubious. Nevertheless, they helped the Soviet Union in substantial ways, transferring its entire gold reserve of ~20,000,000 rubles to the Soviet Union, with additional extracted Tuvan gold worth around 10,000,000 rubles annually. Between June 1941 and October 1944 Tuva supplied the Soviet Red Army with 700,000 livestock, of which almost 650,000 were donated. Almost every Tuvan family donated 10-100 animals (in Tuvan and Mongol families, the average number of livestock for personal use was about at least 130). In the spring of 1944 alone, 27,500 Tuvan cows were presented to the liberated Ukraine. A telegram from the Supreme Council of the Ukrainian SSR to Tuva noted that "The Ukrainian people, like all the peoples of the USSR, deeply appreciate and will never forget the help to the front and the liberated areas that the working people of the Tuvan People's Republic fraternally render ..."

In addition, 50,000 war horses, 52,000 pairs of skis, 10,000 winter coats, 19,000 pairs of gloves, 16,000 boots and 67,000 tons of sheep wool as well as several hundreds tons of meats, grain, carts, sledges, horse tacks and other goods totaling 66,500,000 rubles. Up to 90% was donated. In March 1943, 10 Yakovlev Yak-7 fighters were built with funds raised by Tuvans and placed at the disposal of the Soviet Air Forces.

In March 1943 Tuva mustered volunteer tankers, 11 people joined the Red Army in May 1943 as part of the 25th separate tank regiment of the 52nd Army of the 2nd Ukrainian Front.

Tuva also mustered a volunteer squadron of 208 people in September 1943 to serve in the Soviet cavalry. On November 8, 177 of these were transferred to the 31st Guards Cavalry Regiment of the 8th Guards Cavalry Division and sent to Ukraine in December 1943, where they fought in during 1944. Of the volunteers, 165 men returned home and 17 were awarded the Order of Glory for courage.
