= Khertek Anchimaa-Toka =

Soviet Tuvan politician (1912–2008)

- Хертек Анчимаа-Тока

Chairwoman of the Presidium of the Little Khural of the Tuvan People's Republic
- In office 6 April 1940 – 11 October 1944
- Preceded by: Oyun Polat
- Succeeded by: Position abolished

Personal details
- Born: 1 January 1912 Bay-Tayginsky, Uryankhay Republic, Republic of China
- Died: 4 November 2008 (aged 96) Kyzyl, Tuva, Russia
- Party: Tuvan People's Revolutionary Party
- Spouse: Salchak Toka (m. 1940; died 1973)
- Education: Communist University of the Toilers of the East

Khertek Amyrbitovna Anchimaa-Toka (Note: Tuvan: Анчимаа-Тока Хертек Амырбит уруу, romanized: Anchimaa-Toka Hertek Amyrbit uruu, IPA: [ɐntɕʰɪmɐː tʰoqɐ xertʰek ɐmɤrpɪt ʊruː]) (1 January 1912 – 4 November 2008) was a Soviet Tuvan politician who was the Chairwoman of Little Khural of the Tuvan People's Republic from 1940 to 1944, and was the first non-royal female head of state in history. She was the wife of Salchak Toka, who was the republic's general secretary from 1932 to 1973.

== Early life ==
Khertek Anchimaa was born in what is now Bay-Tayginsky District of Tuva, near the present day settlement of Kyzyl-Dag in 1912. Months earlier the collapse of imperial China's Qing dynasty had led to the end of the nominal Chinese rule over Tuvan territory and the establishment of the independent Tannu Uriankhai under Mongolian and Tuvan nobility. Anchimaa was born the third child in a family of peasant hunters. In the spring of 1918, a smallpox epidemic in the region claimed her father and one of her sisters, leaving her mother to care for Anchimaa and her four other siblings alone. To help make ends meet, the six-year-old Anchimaa was fostered out to a more prosperous branch of the family.

== Career ==
A Russian protectorate was established over Tuva in 1914, however the region became a battleground in the Russian Civil War after 1917 Revolution, where effective control over the territory and capital Belotsarsk changed between Red and White forces several times. However conservative forces in Tuva were defeated in 1920 and the People's Republic of Tannu Tuva was proclaimed on 17 August 1921. The new Soviet-backed government greatly increased education opportunities, and subsequently in a period where very few Tuvans, particularly women, were literate. Anchimaa managed to learn to write and read in Mongolian language. At the age of 18, when the first national Tuvan alphabet was introduced, she was one of the first to learn it, and was subsequently recruited by the state to teach the language to others as a member of the Revolutionary Youth Union (Revsomol), the youth wing of the Tuvan People's Revolutionary Party (TNRP) and the functional equivalent to the CPSU's Komsomol.

A year later, Anchimaa began working as a clerk and technical secretary for the Barun-Khemchiksky kozhuun, helping to oversee local economic production as well as continuing to work to eradicate illiteracy in the district. Her energy and success in these tasks brought her to the attention of the local party leadership. She was admitted to the TNRP and sent, among 70 others, to the Communist University of the Toilers of the East in Moscow, a journey of some 5000 km over three weeks. When asked by the university selection committee in Kyzyl "Where is Moscow" as part of her initial assessment, Anchimaa admitted she did not know but said "If you send me, I will know where it is." Apart from studying, students attended lectures of famous Soviet politicians; the meeting with Nadezhda Krupskaya is said to have affected Khertek greatly. Their education and living while in Moscow was completely funded by the state, however the education proved very challenging for the Tuvans sent due to their low level of basic education and requirement to becoming quickly fluent in Russian. Anchimaa was one of only 11 Tuvan students who ultimately graduated.

== Revsomol ==
Upon her return in 1935, Anchimaa was one of several recent graduates of the University of the Toilers in the East to be placed in positions of political trust in the TNRP due to their political and administrative education in Moscow and their adherence to Stalinist ideology, beginning in 1935 when Anchimaa was put in charge of the propaganda department of Revsomol. In 1938, she became the director of Tuvan Zhenotdel (the analogue of the Soviet Zhenotdel), and Chair of the Women's Section of the Central Committee of the TNRP. In both these positions Anchimaa took a leading role in coordinating action for improving social and economic conditions for women, in particular the eradication of illiteracy and the promotion of employment and education opportunities for women in Tuvan society.

== Education ==
Anchimaa's education meant she had been absent during the height of the "cultural revolution" of Tuva in the early 1930s, during which time the local nobility, lamas and Buddhist monasteries had much of their wealth and power stripped. Tuvan herds and agricultural endeavors were aggressively collectivized along the lines of the Soviet model, however the reforms proved deeply unpopular and were gradually reversed. However, Soviet interference in local matters was frequent, and the TNRP was successively purged to ensure its adherence to Stalinist ideology. The purges of 1932 had seen the fervently pro-Stalin Salchak Toka assume the party chairmanship of the TNRP after the execution of his predecessor Donduk Kuular. The Great Purge took root as well during the late 1930s, with operations mounted by the NKVD in the Tuvan Republic to expose 'right opportunists'. Leading 'counter-revolutionaries' and 'Japanese spies' exposed included Council of Ministers Chairman Sat Churmit-Dazhy^{ru} and Chairman of the Presidium of the Little Khural Adyg-Tyulyush Khemchik-ool. As a leading party member Anchimaa sat on the Special Court convened to investigate the charges, which unanimously found all nine defendants guilty and sentenced them to death. Though very small by comparison to the purges happening elsewhere in the Soviet Union, combined with summary arrests and executions by the NKVD, complete domination of the TNRP and the republic by pro-Moscow Stalinists was now assured.

== Chair of the Presidium of Little Khural ==
In April 1940, Anchimaa became the Chair of the Presidium of Little Khural, the head of state for the Tuvan People's Republic. In doing so she became the first female head of state in the modern era (who did not inherit the title). In doing so she surpassed the achievement of fellow Soviet Alexandra Kollontai, who had become the world's first female government minister in 1917. However, the Tuvan Republic's lack of diplomatic recognition, the scant information and reporting available outside the Soviet Union concerning the extremely isolated Republic (particularly during a period when world attention was focused on Nazi Germany's assault on Denmark and Norway, the opening salvo of Second World War's western front) meant that this fact went unnoticed for some time. Anchimaa would also hold the record as the longest serving non-royal female head of state until Iceland's Vigdís Finnbogadóttir broke it in 1985. In 1940 Anchimaa also married the General Secretary of the TNRP Salchak Toka. She retained her maiden name after marriage (which was very common among the communists and revolutionaries) and only changed it after her husband died in 1973. The marriage was of two of the Tuvan Republic's most powerful political figures, and together Anchimaa and Toka would dominate Tuvan politics for the next three decades.

As Chair of the Presidium she had an extensive correspondence with her equivalent Soviet colleague, Mikhail Kalinin. Her term coincided with World War II in which she took a leading role in mobilizing the resources and manpower of the republic to assist the Soviet Union in defending from the Russian invasion. Within two years over 200 volunteers had joined the Red Army and the republic's economy was entirely dedicated to serving the cause of the war. Tuvan orientation towards Moscow intensified during the war, with Cyrillic script replacing the Latin alphabet for the writing of Tuvan, Russification of social and economic practices, and virtually all opposition to Stalinist policy eradicated. These trends culminated in 1944 in the petition, masterminded by Toka and Anchimaa, for the republic's annexation to become a constituent state of the USSR. The Soviets, desiring the mineral resources of the republic and a permanent end to Mongolian-Chinese geopolitical intrigues over the region, acceded to the request and the state formally ceased to exist in November 1944.

After that the TNRP became a local branch of the CPSU, which Salchak Toka continued to lead. Anchimaa became the deputy chair of the executive committee of the Tuvan CPSU branch, maintaining a leading role in social affairs within Tuva and continuing her work on art and literacy. In 1962, she became vice-chairwoman of Tuvan Council of Ministers, the number two position in the Tuvan Soviet government, being responsible for social welfare, health, education, culture, sports and propaganda.

== Personal life ==
She retired in 1972, acquired the family name "Anchimaa-Toka" after her husband's death in 1973 and led a quiet life until her death. Anchimaa-Toka died on 4 November 2008, in Tuva, at the age of 96.

== See also ==
- Isabel Perón – First female president
- List of the first women holders of political offices
- Vigdís Finnbogadóttir – First elected female president
- Yanjmaa Sükhbaatar

Political offices
Preceded by Oyun Polat	Chair of the Presidium of the Little Khural of the Tuvan People's Republic; 1940–1944	Position abolished
