= Tuvan People's Revolutionary Army =

- Тываның Араттың Революстуг Шерии
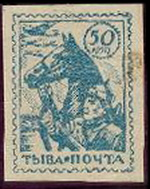
- A 1942 stamp honoring the TNRA.
- Active: 25 September 1924–14 October 1944
- Country: Tuvan People's Republic
- Headquarters: Kyzyl
- Engagements: World War II: Eastern Front

Commanders
- General Secretary of the Central Committee: Mongush Nimachap (first); Salchak Toka (last)
- Notable commanders: Seren Kuzhuget

The Tuvan People's Revolutionary Army (TNRA) (Russian: Тувинская народно-революционная армия; Tuvan: Тываның Араттың Революстуг Шерии) was the military wing of the Tuvan People's Revolutionary Party which constituted the armed forces of the Tuvan People's Republic.

== History ==
The first militarized formations of Tuva appeared during the Russian Civil War on the territory of the former Russian Empire. In 1921, a war ministry in the new republic was formed. A small messenger detachment was formed, which after the abolition of the war ministry the following year, became subordinate to the Ministry of Justice. In the spring of 1924, the government decided to create a regular army, which was approved on 24 September of that year. By September 1925, the messenger detachment was transformed into a squadron, which reached company size. It was named the Tuva Arat Red Army (TAKA). In late 1929, the TAKA's first squadron was doubled and transformed into a cavalry divizion, consisting of two squadrons with a total strength of 402 soldiers. Three years later it was upgraded to a regiment consisting of five squadrons, including two saber squadrons, a heavy machine gun squadron, as well as an artillery department and a regimental school. The interior ministry was founded in 1932, and two years later, the military was renamed to the Tuva People's Revolutionary Army.

The first major attempt to raise the republic's combat readiness took place in the late 30s, at a time when the Empire of Japan undertook militaristic actions against the Republic of China that included the Japanese invasion of Manchuria and the Second Sino-Japanese War 1937. As a result, the 11th Congress of the TPRP (held in November 1939), instructed the Central Committee to begin the process of equipping the TNRA for the next 2–3 years. A year later, in late February 1940, the Ministry of Military Affairs was created, which resulted in the improvement of officer training.

=== World War II ===
During World War II, Tuva and its military worked on the side of the Allied Powers, and specifically, they were on the side of the large neighbor, the Soviet Union, with the Great Khural of Tuva declaring that Tuva is "ready by any means to participate in the struggle of the Soviet Union against the fascist aggressor until their final victory over it." They joined the war within a month of the invasion of the Soviet Union, doubling its military personnel to 1,136 soldiers from around 400 by the end of 1941. In March 1943, it was announced that Tuvan forces would go to the eastern front as volunteers under the command of military formations in the Soviet Red Army. That same month, ten Yakovlev Yak-7 planes were built by the Tuvan military and were gifted to the Soviet Air Force. By early 1944, eleven tankers and 177 out of 208 cavalrymen were assigned to the Soviet command of the 2nd Ukrainian Front in and around the Ukrainian SSR (now Ukraine). The tankists were trained at the Radiansk Tank School and served under the Soviet 52nd Army, under the command of Colonel General Konstantin Koroteyev. In September 1943, the second batch of volunteers were enlisted into the 8th Cavalry Division, where it took part in a raid on the Wehrmacht in Western Ukraine. The Germans had since used the term "Schwarzer Tod" ("Black Death") to refer to the cavalrymen of Tuva.

=== Later years ===
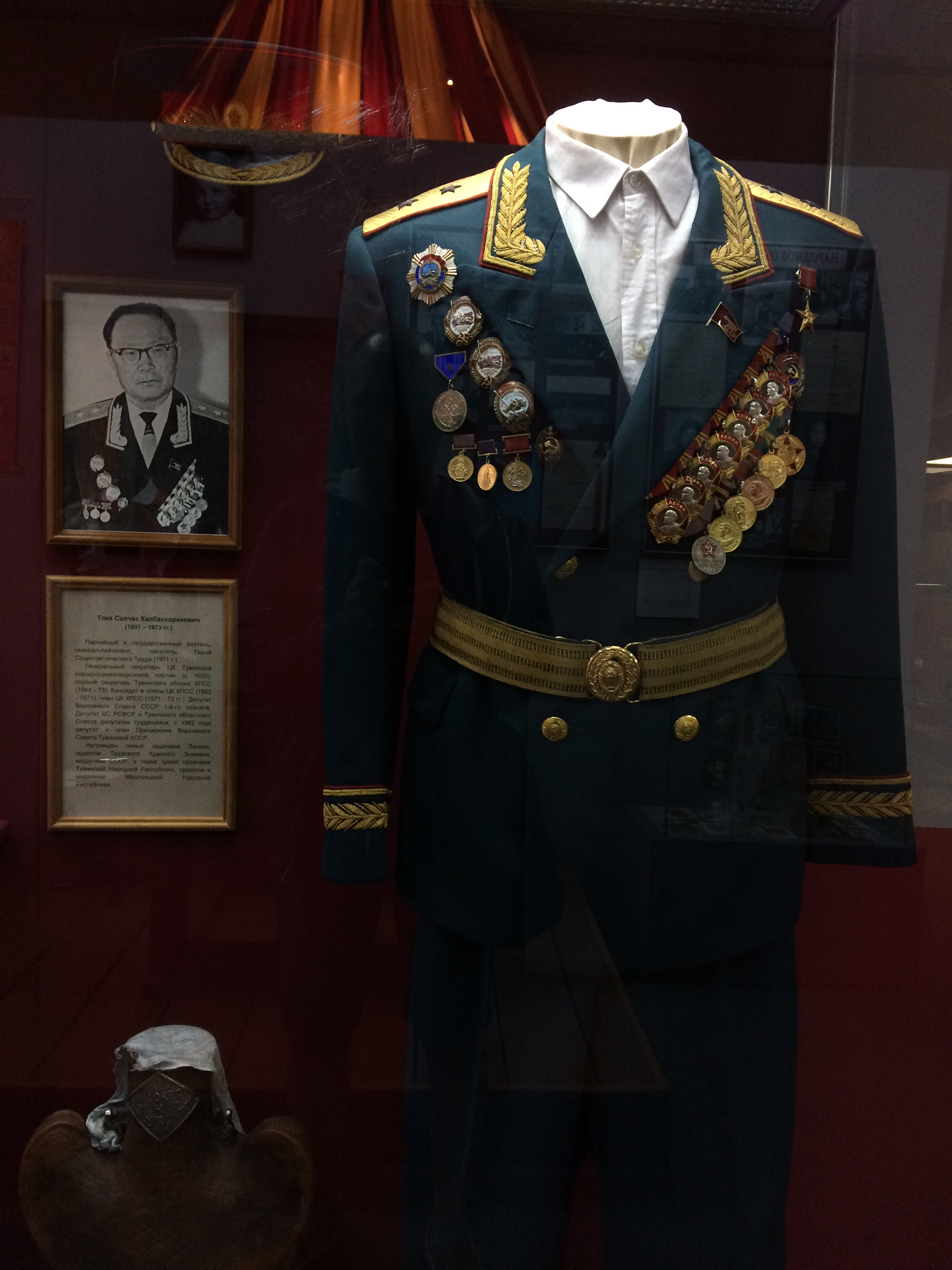
The military parade uniform of Salchak Toka, the last de facto commander-in-chief of the TNRA.

In total, about 8,000 military personnel from the TNRA fought in the war, with 20 being recipients of the Order of Glory. After the Tuvan People's Republic was dissolved on 14 October 1944, and became the Tuvan Autonomous Soviet Socialist Republic under Soviet control, the TNRA was transformed into the 7th Independent Cavalry Regiment of the Siberian Military District, which was dissolved in 1946. One part of the regiment was transferred to the 127th Rifle Division stationed in Krasnoyarsk, and the other became part of the 10th Rifle Division in Irkutsk.

== Structure ==
=== Jurisdiction ===
- Internal Directorate of the Protection of the Country (1927–1936)
- Military Council (1936–1938)
- Government (1938–1940)

=== Assets ===
From 1928 to 1931, the TAKA was housed in a two-story barracks, which stood on the site of the modern building of the Tuva Regional Museum named after Aldan-Maadyr. In the second half of 1931, a military townlet was built on the outskirts of Kyzyl, where the TNRA was stationed until January 1946. After 1946, the barracks was transferred to the 29th Border Detachment of the NKVD.

== Training ==
The Soviet Union assisted in the development in its military, with many in the middle and high command of the TNRA being sent to train at Soviet military institutions of higher education such as the Frunze Military Academy and the Lenin Military-Political Academy. In December 1930, a six-month training school for junior commanders of 20 people was created, holding its first graduation in June 1931 and working without interruption until 1946. In 1925, ten soldiers were sent to the Tver Cavalry School, graduating in 1929.

== Ranks ==
=== 1924–1935 ===
The ranks and insignia were completely identical to the Soviet ones.

High commanders

Rank group	High commanders and chiefs
Collar insignia
Service category	К-14	К-13
Tuvan	Полку даргазы Polku dargazy	Штап даргазы Štap dargazy

Senior and medium commanders

Rank group	Senior commanders and chefs	Medium commanders and chefs
Collar insignia
Service category	К-7	К-5	К-3
Tuvan	Эскадрон даргазы Eskadron dargazy	Взвот даргазы Vozvot dargazy	Старшына; Staršyna

Junior commanders and enlisted men

Rank group	Junior commanders and chefs		Enlisted men
Collar insignia
Service category	К-2	К-1	-
Tuvan	Взвот даргазыныӊ дузалакчызы Vozvot dargazynyň duzalakchyzy	Салбыр даргазы Salbyr dargazy	Пулемет даргазы Pulemet dargazy

=== 1935–1940 ===
The new rank insignia (collar tabs) were elongated and narrowed at the top. In addition to the collar tabs, commissioned officers and generals also had wedge-shaped sleeve insignia of red color where the ranks were distinguished by the number of golden stripes and availability or absence of golden piping.

=== 1940–1942 ===
The ranks were based on the Soviet system but used different rank emblems. Collar tabs were of elongated triangular shape. The most common color was blue (cavalry).

Officers

Rank group	General / flag officers	Senior officers	Junior officers
Tuvan People's Revolutionary Army
Tuvan People's Revolutionary Army	Дайын сайыды Dajyn sajydy		Улуг лейтена́нт Ulug leytenánt	Лейтена́нт; Leytenánt	Биче лейтена́нт Bičii leytenánt

=== From 1943 ===
The following were rank insignia for commissioned officers for the Tuvan People's Revolutionary Army. As the TPRA was organized with Soviet assistance, its ranks generally followed the Red Army precedent.

Rank group	General / flag officers	Senior officers	Junior officers
Tuvan People's Revolutionary Army
Tuvan People's Revolutionary Army			Улуг лейтена́нт Ulug leytenánt	Лейтена́нт; Leytenánt	Биче лейтена́нт Bičii leytenánt

Rank group	Senior NCOs				Junior NCOs	Enlisted
Tuvan People's Revolutionary Army
Tuvan People's Revolutionary Army	Старшына; Staršyna	Улуг сержант Ulug seržant	Сержант; Seržant	Бичии сержант Bičii seržant	Ефрейтор	Рядовой

== Legacy ==
- In May 2010, on the 65th anniversary of Victory Day, a new memorial was opened in the Tuvan capital, with the names of all the Tuvan military volunteers engraved there.
- Today, the Brass Band of the Government of Tuva, which was created on 24 March 2008 from a student band, is the only civilian mounted band in the Russian Federation, reviving the traditions of the Horse Brass Band of the Tuva People's Revolutionary Army, which was active from 1929 to 1944. The first performance of the band was on horseback during a Victory Day Parade in 2008. Many of its performances are done with musicians dressed in the combat uniforms of the TNRA.

== See also ==
- Mongolian People's Army
