= Lenin–Stalinnin tugunun adaa-pile =

1942–1945 Tuvan communist magazine

Cover of issue 2 of Pod znamenem Lenina–Stalina, 1942

Lenin–Stalinnьꞑ tugunuꞑ adaa-pile (Tuvan for 'Under the Banner of Lenin and Stalin') (Note: Tuvan Cyrillic: Ленин–Сталинның тугунуң адаа-биле; also known in Russian as Pod znamenem Lenina–Stalina (Под знаменем Ленина — Сталина)) was a magazine published in Kyzyl in the Tuvan People's Republic (later the Tuvan Autonomous Oblast of the Soviet Union) from 1942 to 1945. It functioned as the theoretical magazine of the Central Committee of the Tuvan People's Revolutionary Party. The magazine was published in Russian- and Tuvan-language editions. Some 5,500 copies of the Russian version and some 16,000 copies of the Tuvan version were printed between 1942 and 1945.

== History ==
The magazine began publication in August 1942. It was issued by the recently founded Tuva State Publishing House (Tuvgosizdat). Salchak Toka was the editor in chief of the magazine. Over the course of its existence, editors of the Russian language edition, Pod znamenem Lenina–Stalina, included V. Belov, M. Volkov, Alexander Palmbach, G. Miroshnichenko, M. Suschevsky and Y. Kalinichev.

The first issue of the Tuvan-language version was titled Lenin–Stalinnьꞑ oruu-pile (On the Path of Lenin and Stalin), but from the second issue onwards the name Lenin–Stalinnьꞑ tugunuꞑ adaa-pile was used. Until the end of 1944 the Tuvan version was written in new Tuvan Latin script, after which it switched to the Cyrillic script.

The Russian and Tuvan versions of the magazine did not have identical contents. For example, the first issue of the Tuvan edition in 1942 included 16 articles (with the first two pieces being written by Stalin and Molotov respectively), whilst its Russian-language counterpart included 10 articles (with the first piece being written by Toka).

The magazine covered issues relating to the political, economic, cultural, scientific and statistical affairs of the republic. According to Aranchyn, the publication called for the "abolition of feudalism and overcoming its religious ideology, for the construction of a non-capitalist economic system and development of a new revolutionary-democratic culture based on Marxist methodology and revolutionary practice". In 1943 the magazine carried an article by P. Kalinichev titled "Folklore of the Tuvan People", that classified Tuvan folklore with emphasis on its class and national character. The young Tuvan writer Salchak Samba-Lündup outlined a theory on development of Tuvan literature in an article titled "Socialist Realism'.

Seventy copies of the magazine, in both the Russian- and Tuvan-language editions, are held in the rare-book collections of the Tuva National Museum.
