= 1929 Tuvan coup d'état =

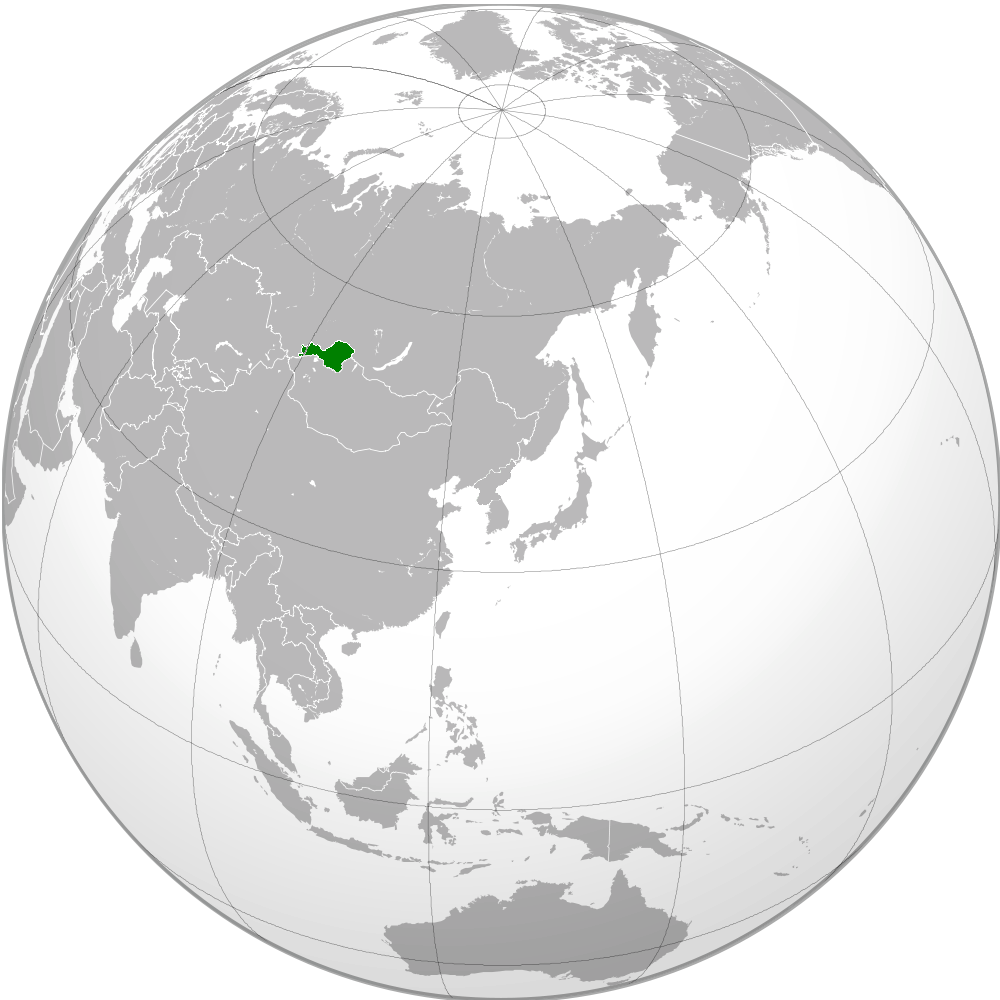
- Location of the Tuvan People's Republic (modern boundaries)
Date	January 1929
Location	Tuvan People's Republic
Result	Coup attempt succeeds

Belligerents
Pro-Soviet faction Supported by: Soviet Union	Tuvan government

Commanders and leaders
Salchak Toka	Donduk Kuular (executed)

The 1929 Tuvan coup d'état took place in the Tuvan People's Republic. It occurred in January after the Tuvan government under Prime Minister Donduk Kuular attempted to implement nationalist, religious and anti-Soviet policies, including making Tibetan Buddhism the official religion. With support from the Soviet Union, five Tuvan youths successfully overthrew the government, and one of them, Salchak Toka, became supreme ruler as General Secretary of the Central Committee of the Tuvan People's Revolutionary Party. They quickly reversed Donduk's policies and brought the republic closer to the Soviet Union. The Tuvan People's Republic later joined the Soviet Union in 1944.

== History ==
=== Background ===
Tuva, today a federal subject of Russia, had been Chinese territory from the Yuan dynasty up until the Wuchang Uprising of 1911 when Tsar Nicholas II of Russia annexed the region. The nominally independent Uryankhay Republic was proclaimed, which after the Russian Revolution—during the Russian Civil War—came to be occupied by the Red Army, the White movement and the Republic of China. After retaking it from the Chinese, the Russian Bolsheviks established the Tannu Tuva People's Republic on 14 August 1921 as another nominally independent state.

=== Donduk's policies ===
Tannu Tuva, renamed the Tuvan People's Republic a few years later, was ruled by the Tuvan People's Revolutionary Party and was recognised by only the Soviet Union (USSR) and the Mongolian People's Republic. The population, numbering roughly 300,000 at the time and largely nomadic, adhered mainly to Tibetan Buddhism ("Lamaism") and Tengrism and lived under feudal conditions. The prime minister at the time was Donduk Kuular, a Buddhist monk. Formally independent, the country (which suffered continuous political unrest and several anti-Bolshevik rebellions) was viewed abroad as a Soviet satellite state. Despite this Prime Minister Donduk enacted distinctly non-Soviet policies, heavily leaning towards theocracy in opposition to the state atheism of the contemporary USSR. In 1928 a law was passed making Lamaism the official state religion and legally restricting the production and distribution of anti-religious propaganda. Donduk, who opposed the influence of Joseph Stalin and the Communist Party of the Soviet Union on his country, also favoured the introduction of religious education for all Tuvan youths.

=== The coup d'état ===
The USSR did not take kindly to these policies. At the same time as the Tuvan government built an increasingly religiously dominated political structure, the Soviet Russians laid the foundations for a new leadership, primarily by making connections among Tuvan youths. Among the measures taken was the creation of a "Revolutionary Union of Youth" movement, members of which were militarily trained, and several Tuvan youths were sent to the Communist University of the Toilers of the East. In January 1929 during the Second Plenary Session of the Central Committee, five of the youths educated in Moscow launched a successful coup d'état, deposing Prime Minister Donduk and his faction. The new government launched a cultural revolution, not only purging about half of the Tuvan People's Revolutionary Party and coming down on the country's feudal landowners through collectivisation (as well as ending the New Economic Policy), but also persecuting lamas and other religious figures and destroying Buddhist temples and monasteries. One of plotters, Salchak Toka, became the pro-Stalinist supreme leader of the country as General Secretary of the Central Committee of the Tuvan People's Revolutionary Party. Donduk was executed in 1932, while his successor remained in power until 1973, overseeing the eventual annexation of the Tuvan People's Republic to the USSR in 1944.

== See also ==
- Buddhist socialism
- History of Tuva
- Khertek Anchimaa-Toka
