= List of leaders of Communist Tuva =

Leaders of Communist Tuva
- Emblem of the Tuvan ASSR
- Seat: Kyzyl
- Appointer: Politburo, Central Committee or any party apparatus (de facto); Parliamentary vote (de jure)
- Formation: 14/15 August 1921
- First holder: Mongush Buyan-Badyrgy (as Chairman of the All-Tuva Constituent Khural)
- Final holder: Kaadyr-ool Bicheldey (as Chairman of the Supreme Soviet); Sherig-ool Oorzhak (as Chairman of the Council of Ministers)
- Abolished: 25 December 1991

The following is a list of leaders of Communist Tuva, encompassing leaders of the Tuvan People's Republic, the Tuvan Autonomous Oblast (the Tuvan AO) and the Tuvan Autonomous Soviet Socialist Republic (the Tuvan ASSR).

It lists heads of state, heads of government, heads of the Tuvan People's Revolutionary Party and of the local branch of the Communist Party of the Soviet Union.

The Tuvan People's Republic was nominally a sovereign state in 1921–44, but it was considered a satellite state of the Soviet Union (the Soviet Union and the Mongolian People's Republic were the only countries to recognize its independence).

In 1944, at the request of Tuva's Small People's Khural (parliament), the Tuvan People's Republic became a part of the Soviet Union as an autonomous oblast (the Tuvan AO) of the Russian Soviet Federative Socialist Republic (the Russian SFSR) by the decision of Presidium of the Supreme Soviet of the USSR.

In 1961, the Tuvan AO became an autonomous soviet socialist republic (the Tuvan ASSR) of the Russian SFSR.

== Tuvan People's Republic ==
=== Heads of state ===
No.	Portrait	Name (Birth–Death)	Term			Political party
No.	Portrait	Name (Birth–Death)	Took office	Left office	Time in office	Political party
Chairman of the All-Tuva Constituent Khural (1921)
1	Mongush Buyan-Badyrgy	Mongush Buyan-Badyrgy (1892–1932)	14 August 1921	15 August 1921	1 day	TPRP
Chairmen of the General Central Council (1921–1923)
(1)	Mongush Buyan-Badyrgy	Mongush Buyan-Badyrgy (1892–1932)	15 August 1921	28 February 1922	197 days	TPRP
2	Maady Lopsan-Osur	Maady Lopsan-Osur (1876–1934?)	1 March 1922	15 August 1922	167 days	TPRP
3	Salchak Idam-Syuryun	Salchak Idam-Syuryun	15 August 1922	1 October 1923	1 year, 47 days	TPRP
Chairmen of the Presidium of the Little Khural (1923–1944)
4	Mongush Nimachap(Nimazhap)	Mongush Nimachap (Nimazhap) (1879–1932)	1 October 1923	4 February 1929	4 years, 139 days	TPRP
5	Adyg Tyulyush Chulydum	Adyg Tyulyush Chulydum (1900–1933)	5 February 1929	5 October 1933	4 years, 242 days	TPRP
6	Adyg-Tulush Khemchik-ool	Adyg-Tulush Khemchik-ool (1893–1938)	1933	February 1938	5 years	TPRP
7	Polat Oyun	Polat Oyun (1906–1992)	2 March 1938	4 April 1940	2 years, 33 days	TPRP
8	Khertek Anchimaa-Toka	Khertek Anchimaa-Toka (1912–2008) (Note: The first non-royal female head of state.)	6 April 1940	10 October 1944	4 years, 187 days	TPRP

=== Heads of government ===
No.	Portrait	Name (Birth–Death)	Term			Political party
No.	Portrait	Name (Birth–Death)	Took office	Left office	Time in office	Political party
Chairmen of the Council of Ministers (1923–1944)
1	Mongush Buyan-Badyrgy	Mongush Buyan-Badyrgy (1892–1932)	1 October 1923	18 September 1924	353 days	TPRP
2	Soyan Oruygu	Soyan Oruygu (1876–?)	18 September 1924	1925	1 year	TPRP
3	Donduk Kuular	Donduk Kuular (1888–1932)	1925	January 1929	4 years	TPRP
4	Adyg-Tulush Khemchik-ool	Adyg-Tulush Khemchik-ool (1893–1938)	January 1929	1929	Several months	TPRP
5	Sat Churmet-Dazhi [ru]	Sat Churmet-Dazhi (1894–1938)	1929	February 1938	9 years	TPRP
6	Ondar Bayyr(Aleksey Bair)	Ondar Bayyr (Aleksey Bair) (1904–1986)	1938	May 1940	2 years	TPRP
Post abolished (May 1940 – 22 June 1941)
7	Saryg-Donggak Chymba(Aleksandr Chimba)	Saryg-Donggak Chymba (Aleksandr Chimba) (1906–1985)	22 June 1941	10 October 1944	3 years, 110 days	TPRP

=== Heads of party ===
No.	Portrait	Name (Birth–Death)	Term			Political party
No.	Portrait	Name (Birth–Death)	Took office	Left office	Time in office	Political party
Chairman of the Organizing Bureau of the Tuvan People's Revolutionary Party (1921–1922)
1	Mongush Nimachap(Nimazhap)	Mongush Nimachap (Nimazhap) (1879–1932)	29 October 1921	March 1922	4 months	TPRP
Chairmen of the Central Committee of the Tuvan People's Revolutionary Party (1922–1924)
2	Maady Lopsan-Osur	Maady Lopsan-Osur (1876–1934?)	March 1922	9 July 1923	1 year, 4 months	TPRP
3	Oyun Kyursedi(Kursedi)	Oyun Kyursedi (Kursedi) (1884–1924)	9 July 1923	15 March 1924	250 days	TPRP
General Secretary of the Central Committee of the Tuvan People's Revolutionary Party (1924–1926)
4	Shagdyr	Shagdyr	April 1924	January 1926	1 year, 9 months	TPRP
First Secretaries of the Central Committee of the Tuvan People's Revolutionary Party (1926–1932)
5	Mongush Buyan-Badyrgy	Mongush Buyan-Badyrgy (1892–1932)	January 1926	February 1927	1 year, 1 month	TPRP
6	Sodnam Balchir	Sodnam Balchir (1901–?)	February 1927	January 1929	1 year, 11 months	TPRP
7	Irgit Shagdyrzhap	Irgit Shagdyrzhap (1899–1959)	January 1929	March 1932	3 years, 2 months	TPRP
General Secretary of the Central Committee of the Tuvan People's Revolutionary Party (1932–1944)
8	Salchak Toka	Salchak Toka (1901–1973)	6 March 1932	10 October 1944	12 years, 218 days	TPRP

=== Heads of finance ministry ===
Term	Name
1928–1930	Sodnam Oorjak
1932–1934	Tanchai Oyun
1933–1937	Polat Oyun
1940–1941	Nikolay Tovarishtay
1941–1943	Shamir Erectol
1943–1944	Kenden Lopsan

== Tuvan Autonomous Oblast / Tuvan Autonomous Soviet Socialist Republic ==
=== Heads of state ===
No.	Portrait	Name (Birth–Death)	Term			Political party
No.	Portrait	Name (Birth–Death)	Took office	Left office	Time in office	Political party
Chairmen of the Executive Committee of the Autonomous Oblast Soviet (1944–1962)
1	Saryg-Donggak Chymba(Aleksandr Chimba)	Saryg-Donggak Chymba (Aleksandr Chimba) (1906–1985)	13 October 1944	February 1961	16 years, 3 months	CPSU
2	Mikhail Mendume	Mikhail Mendume (1922–2001)	February 1961	10 January 1962	11 months	CPSU
Chairmen of the Presidium of the Supreme Soviet (1962–1990)
3	Bay-Kara Dolchanmaa	Bay-Kara Dolchanmaa (1916–2002)	10 January 1962	22 June 1977	15 years, 163 days	CPSU
(2)	Mikhail Mendume	Mikhail Mendume (1922–2001)	22 June 1977	December 1984	7 years, 5 months	CPSU
4	Chimit-Dorzhu Ondar	Chimit-Dorzhu Ondar (born 1932)	December 1984	27 April 1990	5 years, 4 months	CPSU
Chairmen of the Supreme Soviet (1990–1991)
(4)	Chimit-Dorzhu Ondar	Chimit-Dorzhu Ondar (born 1932)	27 April 1990	2 October 1991	1 year, 158 days	CPSU
5	Kaadyr-ool Bicheldey	Kaadyr-ool Bicheldey (born 1950)	2 October 1991	25 December 1991	84 days	Independent

=== Heads of government ===
No.	Portrait	Name (Birth–Death)	Term			Political party
No.	Portrait	Name (Birth–Death)	Took office	Left office	Time in office	Political party
Chairmen of the Council of Ministers (1944–1991)
Post abolished (10 October 1944 – 10 January 1962)
1	Mikhail Mendume	Mikhail Mendume (1922–2001)	10 January 1962	22 June 1977	15 years, 163 days	CPSU
2	Chimit-Dorzhu Ondar	Chimit-Dorzhu Ondar (born 1932)	22 June 1977	December 1984	7 years, 5 months	CPSU
3	Vladimir Seryakov	Vladimir Seryakov (1934–2016)	December 1984	April 1990	5 years, 4 months	CPSU
4	Sherig-ool Oorzhak	Sherig-ool Oorzhak (1942–2026)	28 April 1990	25 December 1991	1 year, 241 days	CPSU

=== Heads of party ===
No.	Portrait	Name (Birth–Death)	Term			Political party
No.	Portrait	Name (Birth–Death)	Took office	Left office	Time in office	Political party
First Secretary of the Autonomous Oblast Committee of the Communist Party of the Soviet Union (1944–1961)
1	Salchak Toka	Salchak Toka (1901–1973)	13 October 1944	10 October 1961	16 years, 362 days	CPSU
First Secretaries of the Regional Committee of the Communist Party of the Soviet Union (1961–1991)
(1)	Salchak Toka	Salchak Toka (1901–1973)	11 October 1961	11 May 1973	11 years, 213 days	CPSU
2	Grigoriy Shirshin [ru]	Grigoriy Shirshin (born 1934)	6 June 1973	23 August 1991	18 years, 78 days	CPSU

== See also ==
- Head of the Republic of Tuva
- History of Tuva
- Tuvan People's Republic
  - 1929 Tuvan coup d'état
- Tuvan Autonomous Oblast
- Tuvan Autonomous Soviet Socialist Republic

== Sources ==
- World Statesmen.org (for the Tuvan Socialist Republic)
- World Statesmen.org (for the Tuvan AO and the Tuvan ASSR)
