= Tuvan Regional Committee of the Communist Party of the Soviet Union =

The First Secretary of the Tuvan regional branch of the Communist Party of the Soviet Union was the position of highest authority in the Tuvan AO (1944–1961) and the Tuvan ASSR (1961–1991) in the Russian SFSR of the Soviet Union. The position was created on October 13, 1944, and abolished in August 1991. The First Secretary was a de facto appointed position usually by the Politburo or the General Secretary himself.

== List of First Secretaries of the Communist Party of Tuva ==
Name	Term of Office		Life years
Name	Start	End	Life years
First Secretary of the Autonomous Oblast Committee of the Communist Party
Salchak Toka	October 13, 1944	October 10, 1961	1901–1973
First Secretaries of the Regional Committee of the Communist Party
Salchak Toka	October 10, 1961	May 11, 1973	1901–1973
Grigory Shirshin	June 1973	August 1991	1934–

== See also ==
- Tuvan People's Revolutionary Party
- Tuvan Autonomous Oblast
- Tuvan Autonomous Soviet Socialist Republic

== Sources ==
- World Statesmen.org
