= Donduk Kuular =

Prime Minister of Tannu Tuva (1888–1932)

- Куулар Дондук
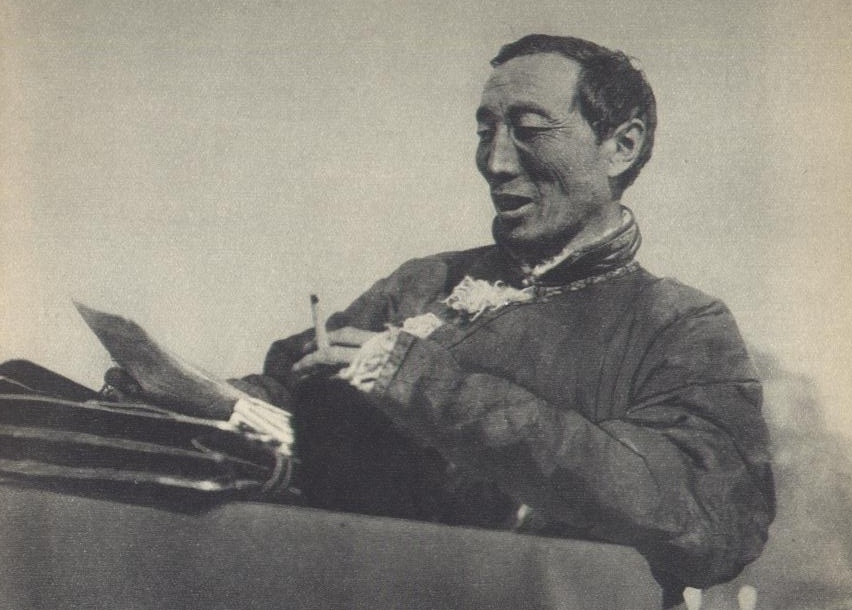

Chairman of the Council of Ministers of the Tuvan People's Republic
- In office 1925–1929
- Preceded by: Soyan Oruygu
- Succeeded by: Adyg-Tulush Khemchik-ool

Personal details
- Born: 1888 Tannu Uriankhai, Outer Mongolia, Qing China
- Died: March 23, 1932 (aged 43–44)
- Party: Tuvan People's Revolutionary Party

Donduk Kuular (Tuvan: Куулар Дондук, [kuːˈlɑr dɔnˈduk]; 1888–1932) was a Tuvan monk, politician, and prime minister of the Tuvan People's Republic.

== Life ==
Born in Tannu Uriankhai during the rule of the Qing dynasty of China, Donduk was originally a Lamaist monk. As leader of a group of Russian-supported Bolsheviks, he proclaimed the independence of the People's Republic of Tannu Tuva from the Russian Empire in 1921. He subsequently switched his allegiance to the Tuvan People's Revolutionary Party.

Aware of his young nation's vulnerability, Donduk sought to establish ties with the Mongolian People's Republic. His monastic background and theocratic inclinations gave him a close relationship with the country's lamas, whose interests he sought to advance in spite of Joseph Stalin's growing irritation. In 1926 he established Buddhism as the state religion of Tannu Tuva, which in November was renamed the Tuvan People's Republic.

Stalin found Donduk's separatist and theocratic tendencies obnoxious, and counter to communist principles of internationalism and atheism. In 1929 he was removed from power and arrested. Meanwhile, five Tuvan graduates of the Communist University of the Toilers of the East were appointed commissars extraordinary to Tuva. Their loyalty to Stalin ensured that they would pursue policies, such as collectivization, that Donduk had ignored. A coup was launched in 1929. One of these commissars, Salchak Toka, replaced Donduk as General Secretary of the Tuvan People's Revolutionary Party. On 22 March 1932, Donduk was sentenced the highest penalty – death by firing squad – alongside 3 other figures named "exploiters" including Mongush Buyan-Badyrgy, and the following day they were executed.
