= Kozhuun =

Tuvan administrative division

Kozhuun (/kɒˈʒuːn/; Tuvan: Кожуун, pronounced [qɔˈʑuːn]) is the Tuvan term of an historical feudal administrative division known as a banner.

The term kozhuun is used today as a unit in the system of the administrative divisions of the Tuva Republic of Russia. A typical federal subject of Russia is subdivided into raions. Kozhuun is an ethnic name for a raion, used only in Tuva.

Tuva historically had nine kozhuun. Each kozhuun was divided into sums which was then subdivided into arbans.

== List of historical kozhuuns ==
- Beezi
- Daa-van and Choodu
- Khaasuut
- Khemchik
- Nibazy
- Oyunnar
- Salchak
- Shalyk
- Tozhu
