= Communist University of the Toilers of the East =

University in Moscow, Russia (1921–c. 1939)

The Communist University of the Toilers of the East (Russian: Коммунистический университет трудящихся Востока, КУТВ, KUTV; also known as the Far East University) was a revolutionary training school for important communist political leaders. The school operated under the umbrella of the Communist International (Comintern) and was in existence from 1921 until the late 1930s. Part of the university was split into the Moscow Sun Yat-sen University.

== History ==
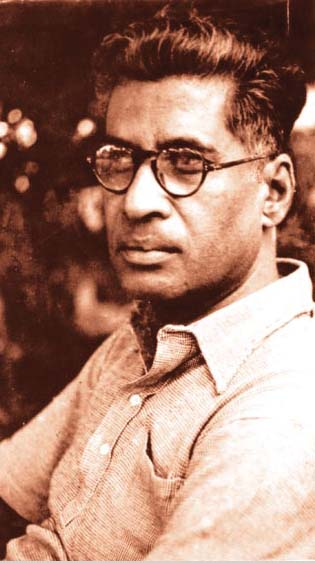
M. N. Roy, Indian nationalist revolutionary

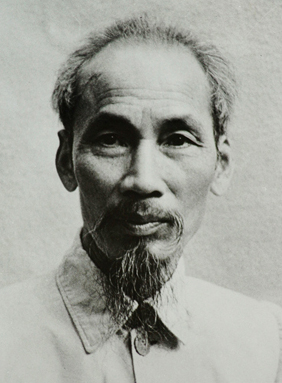
Ho Chi Minh

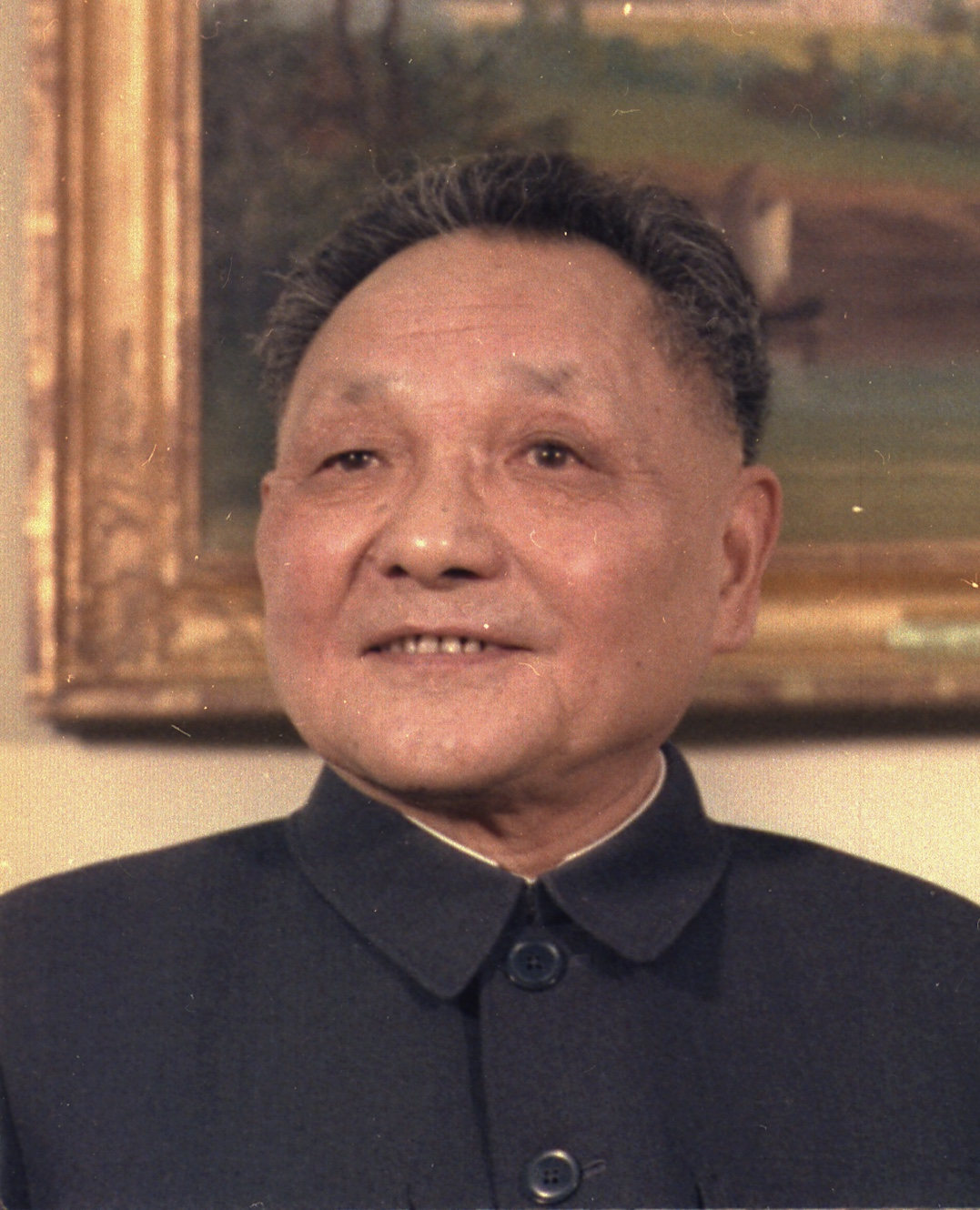
Deng Xiaoping

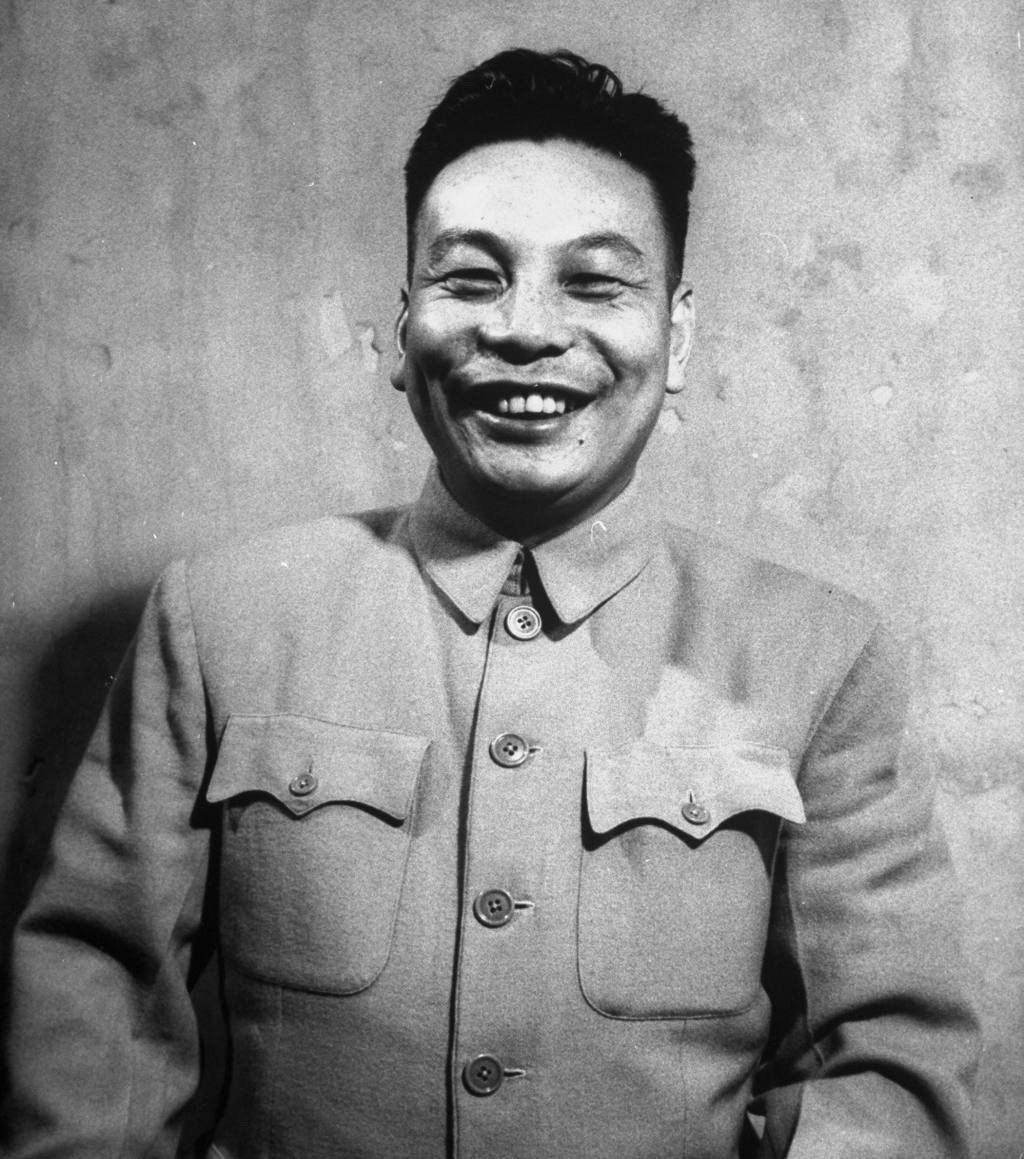
Chiang Ching-kuo, President of Taiwan, 1978–1988

In September 1920, the Comintern held an International Conference of Asian Nations in Baku.

The Communist University of the Toilers of the East (KUTV) was established in 1921 in Moscow by the Comintern as a technical college for communist cadres from the Soviet periphery, though it also matriculated students from the Arab world, Africa, and East and South Asia. The school officially opened on October 21, 1921. It performed a similar function to the International Lenin School, which mainly accepted students from Europe and the Americas. It was headed in its initial years by Grigory Broydo, later First Secretary of the Communist Party of Tajikistan. The curriculum included both theoretical and practical matters, including Marxist theory, party organization and propaganda, law and administration, theory and tactics of proletarian revolution, problems of socialist construction, and trade union organization.

From summer 1922, the KUTV had regional branches in Baku (in Azerbaijan), Irkutsk (in Siberia, Russia), and Tashkent (in Uzbekistan). The university published Revolutionary East (Революционный Восток, Revoliutsionnyi Vostok). Amongst those who taught there were Anatoly Lunacharsky, Leonid Krasin, Mikhail Pokrovsky, Khalid Bakdash, Igor Reisner, and Boris Shumyatsky.

Many Chinese communist leaders, including Liu Shaoqi, studied at KUTV in the 1920s.

Ho Chi Minh began studies at the university in summer 1923.

In 1928, the Japanese Foreign Ministry estimated that some 1,000 foreign students studied at KUTV, and that the 400 Chinese students comprised the largest group, followed by 350 ethnic minorities within the Soviet Union, and between 30 and 40 Japanese. The Soviet Union solicited working-class Japanese to study at the KUTV without the Japanese government's consent. The Japanese students studied under Sadaki Takahashi and Keizo Yamamoto, along with several Russian instructors. The Japanese students studied economics, the history of world revolution, Leninism, philosophy, labor union theory, and Japanese studies. Kyuichi Tokuda, a member of the Japanese Communist Party, was instrumental in recruiting and sending these Japanese workers to KUTV via Shanghai and Vladivostok.

The KUTV published a journal entitled Revolutsionnyi vostok (Russian: Revolutionary East) between 1927 and 1938.

The university was closed in the late 1930s. A report from the University of Virginia notes:

KUTV came to an end during the Great Terror of 1937-38, together with many Comintern institutions and cadres. A sizeable proportion of its faculty and Moscow-based alumni was arrested and even executed, dealing a major blow to Soviet expertise.

== Notable alumni ==
Prominent alumni of the KUTV include:

- Khertek Anchimaa-Toka, chairperson of the Little Khural of Tannu-Tuva
- Bankole Awoonor-Renner, Ghanaian politician, journalist, anti-colonialist and Pan-Africanist from 1925 to 1927
- Khalid Bakdash, secretary of the Syrian Communist Party from 1936 until 1995
- Chiang Ching-kuo, President of the Republic of China (Taiwan), 1925 class
- Cho Bong-am, Korean communist activist
- Deng Xiaoping, paramount leader of the People's Republic of China, 1925 class
- Evangelista, Crisanto, founder of the Partido Komunista ng Pilipinas-1930, class of 1928.
- Mirsaid Sultan-Galiev, architect of Muslim national communism
- Hà Huy Tập, third General Secretary of the Communist Party of Vietnam
- Harry Haywood, leading African American member of the Communist Party USA
- Jane Golden, black American student who died during her time at KUTVA
- Nâzım Hikmet, Turkish poet
- Ho Chi Minh, President of North Vietnam, 1923 class
- Ho Song-taek, future North Korean politician
- Hasan Israilov, Chechen insurrectionist
- Sen Katayama of the American and Japanese Communist Parties
- Jomo Kenyatta, the founding father and first head of state of the Republic of Kenya
- Kim Yong-bom, General Secretary of the Communist Party of Korea
- Lê Hồng Phong, second General Secretary of the Communist Party of Vietnam
- Liu Shaoqi, President of the People's Republic of China, 1921 class
- Magomet Mamakaev, Chechen writer
- Tan Malaka of the Indonesian Communist Party
- Manabendra Nath Roy, helped found the Communist Parties of Mexico and India
- Muhammad Najati Sidqi, writer, activist in the Palestinian independence movement, from 1925 to 1928
- Ja'far Pishevari, founder and chairman of communist Azerbaijan People's Government
- Salchak Toka, Tuvan government official
- Sbulawelani Shwala, leader of the Young Communist League of South Africa and Revolutionary writer Republic of South Africa
- Trần Phú, first General Secretary of the Communist Party of Vietnam
- Wang Fanxi, prominent Chinese Trotskyist
- Xiang Jingyu, Chinese revolutionary
- Yusuf Salman Yusuf, secretary of the Iraqi Communist Party from 1941 to 1949
- Nikolaos Zachariadis, General Secretary of Communist Party of Greece and chairman of Greek communist Provisional Democratic Government, 1947 to 1949

== See also ==
- Communist University of the National Minorities of the West
- List of modern universities in Europe (1801–1945)
- Chinese-Lenin School of Vladivostok
