= Tuvan People's Revolutionary Party =

Ruling party of the Tuvan People's Republic

- Abbreviation: TPRP (English); ТАХN (Tuvan); TNRP (Russian)
- General Secretary: Salchak Toka
- Governing body: Central Committee
- Founded: 29 October 1921
- Dissolved: 11 October 1944
- Merged into: All-Union Communist Party (Bolsheviks)
- Succeeded by: Tuvan Regional Committee of the VKP(b)
- Headquarters: Kyzyl, Tuvan People's Republic
- Newspaper: Tuvinskaya Pravd; Pod znamenem Lenina–Stalina
- Youth wing: Tuvan Revolutionary Union of Youth
- Armed wing: Tuvan People's Revolutionary Army (1924–1944)
- Membership (1944): 6,807
- Ideology: Communism; Marxism–Leninism; Buddhist socialism (1926–1929); Anti-theism (from 1929)
- Political position: Far-left
- Religion: Tibetan Buddhism (until 1929)
- International affiliation: Communist International (from 1935)
- Slogan: БYГY ЧURT TАРHЫH ПPOЛETAPЫH TАРHЙЛEPИ KATTЫЖЫHAP!
- Anthem: "The Internationale"

Party flag

Tuvan People's Revolutionary Party

Mongolian name
- Mongolian script: ᠲᠠᠩᠨᠦ ᠲᠤᠧᠠ ᠢᠢᠨ ᠠᠷᠠᠳ ᠤᠨ ᠬᠤᠪᠢᠰᠭᠠᠯ ᠳᠤ ᠨᠠᠮ

Tuvan name
- Tuvan: Тьва arat-хuviskaalçь nam

The Tuvan People's Revolutionary Party (Note: Tuvan: Тьва arat-хuviskaalçь nam; Mongolian: ᠲᠠᠩᠨᠦᠲᠤᠧᠠ ᠢᠢᠨᠠᠷᠠᠳ ᠤᠨᠬᠤᠪᠢᠰᠭᠠᠯ ᠳᠤᠨᠠᠮ, Tangnu Tuva-yin arad-un qubisγal-tu nam) was a political party in Tuva, founded in 1921. When the Tuvan People's Republic was founded in the same year, the party held single-party control over its government as a vanguard party.

== History ==
Under Soviet sponsorship, a conference of Tuvan revolutionaries convened on 29 October 1921, and an organization bureau was formed. The first Congress met on 28 February 1922, when the Tuvan "People's Government" was established. However, as soon as the Second Congress convened on 6 July 1923, the former party was dissolved because of Soviet dissatisfaction, and a new one was organized. The Fourth Congress met in October 1925; the Seventh Congress, in 1928. The Central Committee was authorized to establish party cells and branches of the league of revolutionary youth throughout the country.

During the Second Plenary Session of the Central Committee of the party in 1929 the right-wing leadership, which had intended to retain Tibetan Buddhism as a state religion in the old sense, in contradiction to the proclaimed constitution, was completely destroyed. Under the watchword of "antifeudal revolution," the Eighth Congress paved the way for “socialist reconstruction” through collectivisation. When, in April–May 1930, the so-called "counterrevolution of the Tuvan nobles and the Russian kulak-colonists" broke out with the intent "to overthrow the 'Revolutionary Government,'" it was also put down by force. Resolutions were adopted in the Central Committee of the People's Revolutionary Party to confiscate the property of the “exploiter class”, to conduct agricultural collectivization "on an unconditionally voluntary basis", "to struggle for complete independence from the imperialist countries and to co-operate closely with the oppressed peoples and the working class of the whole world."

A prominent figure in the party’s initial stage was Donduk Kuular. In 1929–1932 a political shift occurred, beginning with the 1929 Tuvan coup d'état, as what Stalin saw as “nationalist” elements of the party, including Kuular, were purged. The leadership of the party was taken over by Salchak Toka.

The party was admitted to the Comintern as a "sympathizing party" at its Seventh Congress in 1935.

== See also ==
- Tuvan Regional Committee of the Communist Party of the Soviet Union
