= Salchak Toka =

Tuvan politician (1901–1973)

- Салчак Тока

General Secretary of the Central Committee of the Tuvan People's Revolutionary Party
- In office 6 March 1932 – 10 October 1944
- Preceded by: Irgit Shagdyrzhap
- Succeeded by: Position renamed

First Secretary of the Tuvan Autonomous Oblast Committee of the CPSU
- In office 13 October 1944 – 10 October 1961
- Preceded by: Position renamed
- Succeeded by: Position renamed

First Secretary of the Tuvan Regional Committee of the CPSU
- In office 11 October 1961 – 11 May 1973
- Preceded by: Position renamed
- Succeeded by: Grigoriy Shirshin

Personal details
- Born: 15 December 1901 Mergen Lamaiin Hiid, Outer Mongolia, Qing China
- Died: 11 May 1973 (aged 71) Kyzyl, Tuvan ASSR, Russian SFSR, Soviet Union
- Citizenship: Qing China; Tuvan People's Republic; Soviet Union
- Party: CPSU (1944–1973)
- Other political affiliations: Tuvan People's Revolutionary Party (1921–1944)
- Spouse: Khertek Anchimaa (m. 1940)

Salchak Kalbakkhorekovich Toka (Russian: Салчак Калбакхорекович Тока, 15 December [O.S. 2 December] 1901 – 11 May 1973) was a Tuvan and later, Soviet politician. He was General Secretary of the Tuvan department of the CPSU from 1944 to 1973; previously, he was the General Secretary of the Central Committee of the Tuvan People's Revolutionary Party and was the supreme ruler of the Tuvan People's Republic from 1932 until its annexation by the Soviet Union in 1944.

== Biography ==
Salchak Toka was a member of the Communist University of the Toilers of the East (Коммунистический университет трудящихся Востока, Kommunisticheskiy universitet trudyashchikhsya Vostoka) in Moscow and Kyzyl. In 1929, the Soviets arrested the head of state Donduk Kuular. Meanwhile, five Tuvan graduates of the Communist University of the Toilers of the East were appointed commissars extraordinary to Tuva. Their loyalty to Stalin ensured that they would pursue policies, such as collectivization, that Donduk had ignored. A coup was launched in 1929. On 6 March 1932, Salchak Toka replaced Donduk as General Secretary of the Tuvan People's Revolutionary Party.

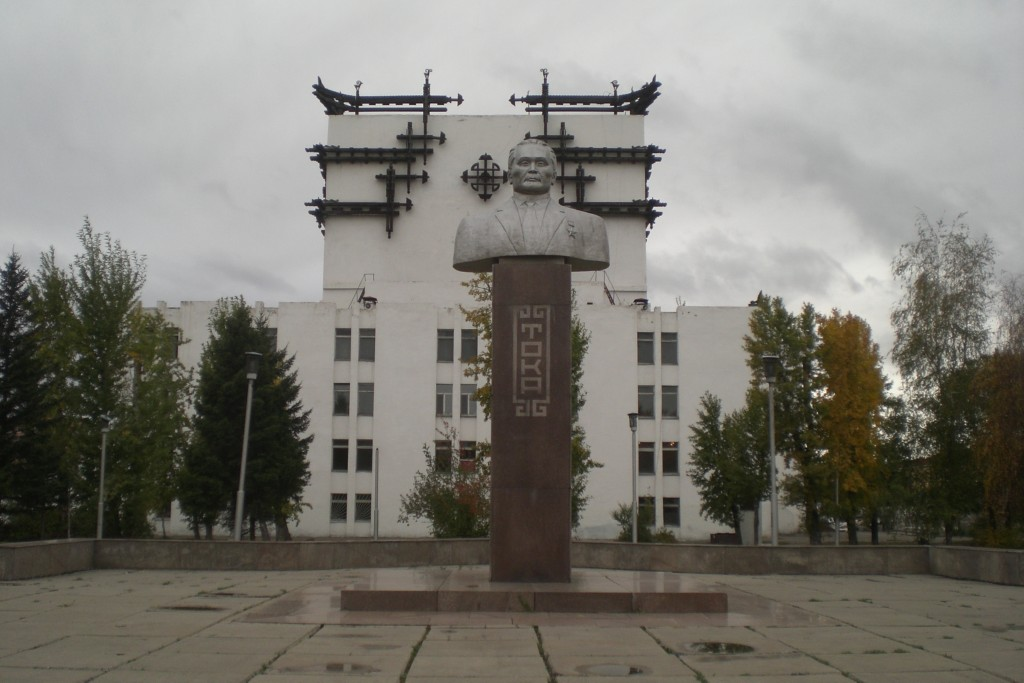
Statue of Toka

Salchak Toka established close contacts with Joseph Stalin. After the execution of Donduk Kuular in 1932, Salchak Toka became the ruler of Tannu Tuva. He introduced a communist ideology after the Soviet model, the nomad agriculture was collectivised and the traditional religions (Tibetan Buddhism and Shamanism) were suppressed. A personal cult developed around him, and he was awarded numerous Soviet prizes for his literary works.

In 1940 he married Khertek Anchimaa, who was Chairwoman of the Little Khural. In 1944 he requested that Tuva should be annexed by the Soviet Union. The event took place on 30 October 1944 de jure via Mikhail Kalinin. Tuva was initially an autonomous oblast of the Russian Soviet Federative Socialist Republic (RSFSR) and starting from 10 October 1961 as the Tuvan Autonomous Soviet Socialist Republic (Tuva ASSR). Salchak Toka remained up to his death in 1973 the General Secretary of the Tuvan department of the Communist Party of the Soviet Union.

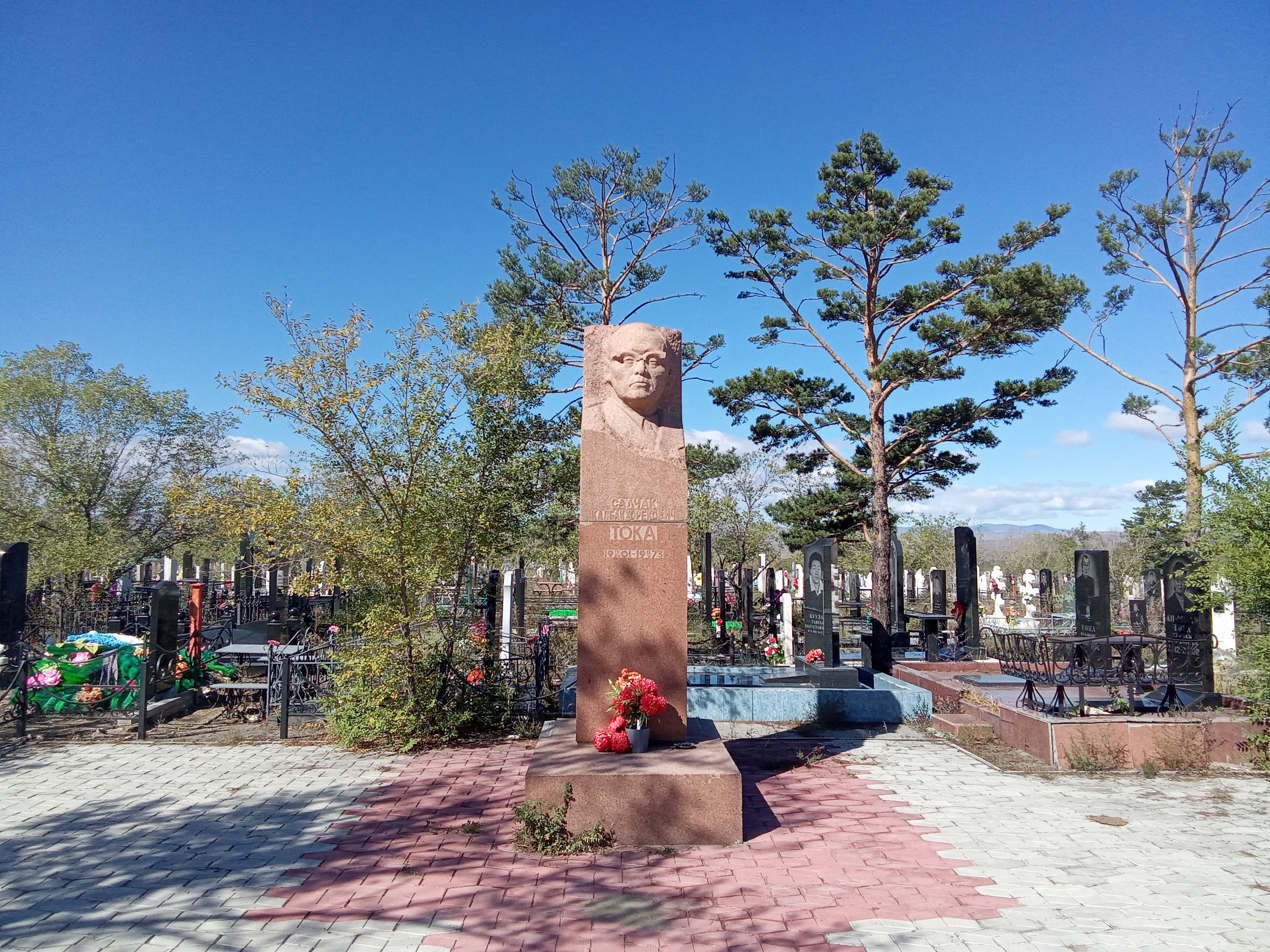
Gravestone at the town cemetery
