= Béla Székula =

- Born: 1881
- Died: 1966 (aged 84–85)
- Occupation: Philatelists
- Spouse: Berta Huguenin

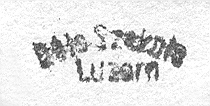
Stamp expert mark of Béla Sekula during his Luzern period of life.

Béla Székula, also Bela Sekula (1881–1966), was a Hungarian philatelist, stamp dealer and forger who lived in Hungary, Switzerland and the USA.

== Early life and family ==
Béla Székula was born in Hungary in 1881. He was the father of the artist Sonia Sekula and the brother of the stamp dealers Eugen Sekula, Frank Sekula (the Frasek Company) and Geza Sekula (Charles Sekula).

== Career ==
Sekula is known for his involvement in making forged reprints of the 1919 Animal and Rulers issue of Ethiopia in 1931. In addition, he was involved in producing many other dubious stamp issues by the creation and issuing of local stamps - for example in Lucerne, Switzerland - and by overprinting existing stamps. He was even thought to be behind the production of stamps for the region of Tannu Tuva during 1934-1936.

In 1928 and 1929 he was responsible for the auction of large parts of the Ludvig Lindberg collection of Finland.

== Death ==
Székula died in 1966.

== See also ==
- Postage stamps and postal history of Ethiopia
- Postage stamps and postal history of Tannu Tuva
