= Samuil Blekhman =

Samuil Markovich Blekhman Самуи́л Ма́ркович Бле́хман
- Born: May 15, 1918; Moscow, Russia
- Died: December 26, 1982 (aged 64); Moscow, USSR
- Resting place: Moscow, Russia
- Education: Diploma of Higher Education
- Alma mater: Moscow Aviation Institute
- Occupation: engineer
- Spouses: Aleksandra Bakkal (1st marriage); Olga Korneyeva (2nd marriage)
- Children: Viktor Bakkal (son)
- Relatives: Mark Blekhman (father); Dina Vymenits (mother)
- Writing career
- Language: Russian, English
- Period: 1961–1982; posthumous publications
- Genre: philatelic research
- Subjects: postal history, philately, airmail
- Notable works: The Postal History and Stamps of Tuva
- Notable awards: Gold Medal 1957 Moscow International Stamp Exhibition – Laureate; Gold-Silver, Silver Gilded, and Silver Medals, Silver-plated Plaquette 1962 World Stamp Exhibition "PRAGA 1962"; Gilded Plaquette 1966 National Stamp Exhibition "Brno-1966" – Honorary Class; Gilded Medal 1966 International Stamp Exhibition "Paris–Moscow–Leningrad"; Gilded Medal, Honorary Award 1967 FISA International Stamp Exhibition "Aerophila"; Honorary Diploma 1969 USSR Ministry of Communications

Samuil Markovich Blekhman (Russian: Самуи́л Ма́ркович Бле́хман; 15 May 1918 – 26 December 1982) was a renowned philatelist of the Soviet Union who wrote a number of notable philatelic books and articles. He was born in Moscow, was trained and worked as an engineer, and lived much of his life in Moscow.

Blekhman's works were related to postal history and postage stamps of Tuva, Mongolia, Russia and Soviet Union as well as airmail. He participated in prestigious national and international philatelic exhibitions and won a number of high-caliber awards. One of his main philatelic contributions was a detailed study of Tuva stamps and their cataloging, which was awarded the silver-plated plaquette at the World Stamp Exhibition "Praga 1962" and posthumously translated and published in English.

== Works ==
In addition to numerous Russian articles, Samuil Blekhman published his philatelic research papers in English:

- Blekhman, S. M. (1970). "The local 1932–1933 surcharges of Tuva". Rossica: Journal of the Rossica Society of Russian Philately. 79: 5–10. ISSN 0035-8363.
- Blekhman, S. M. (1979). "Airmail stamps of the Soviet Consulate in Berlin". Rossica: Journal of the Rossica Society of Russian Philately. 96–97. D. M. Skipton (trans.): 97–101. ISSN 0035-8363.
- Blekhman, S. M. (1979). "Rare varieties of USSR miniature sheets". Rossica: Journal of the Rossica Society of Russian Philately. 96–97: 113–114. ISSN 0035-8363.
- Blekhman, S. M. (1980). "The field post in the Caucasus during the Russo-Turkish War of 1877–1878". Rossica: Journal of the Rossica Society of Russian Philately. 98–99. D. Skipton (trans.): 16–20. ISSN 0035-8363.
- Blekhman, S. M. (1980). "Private mail-order forms of the Moscow City Post". Rossica: Journal of the Rossica Society of Russian Philately. 98–99. M. Tihomirov (trans.): 100. ISSN 0035-8363.
- Blekhman, S. M. (1983). "Postal history of the Mongolian People's Republic". Rossica: Journal of the Rossica Society of Russian Philately. 104–105. D. Skipton (trans.): 7–11. ISSN 0035-8363.
- Blekhman, S. M. (1988). "Civil War in Siberia and the Far East in the mirror of philatey (1917–1923)". Rossica: Journal of the Rossica Society of Russian Philately. 111. G. Shalimoff (trans.): 52–57. ISSN 0035-8363.
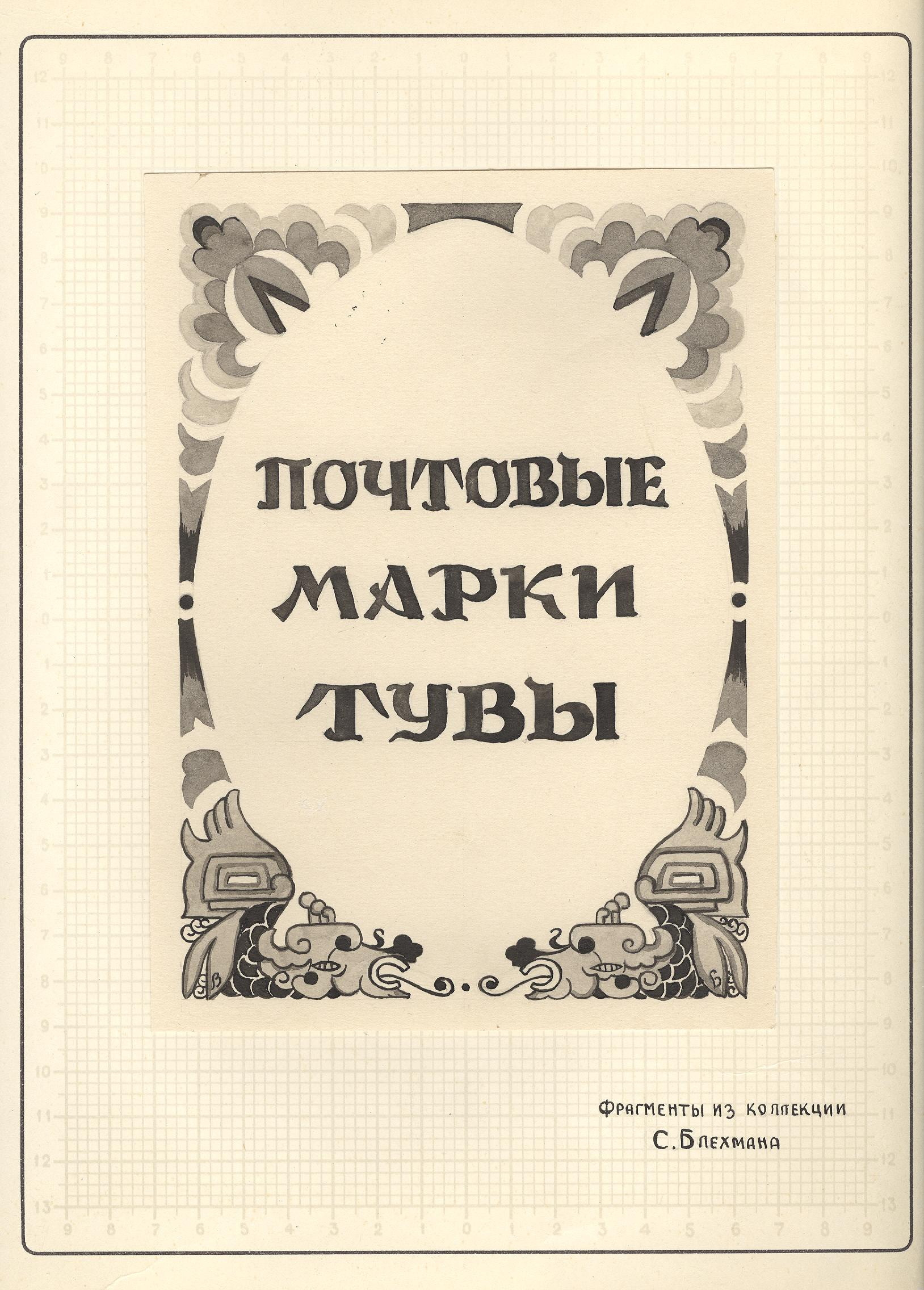
Title page of the Blekhman's philatelic exposition "Postage Stamps of Tuva"

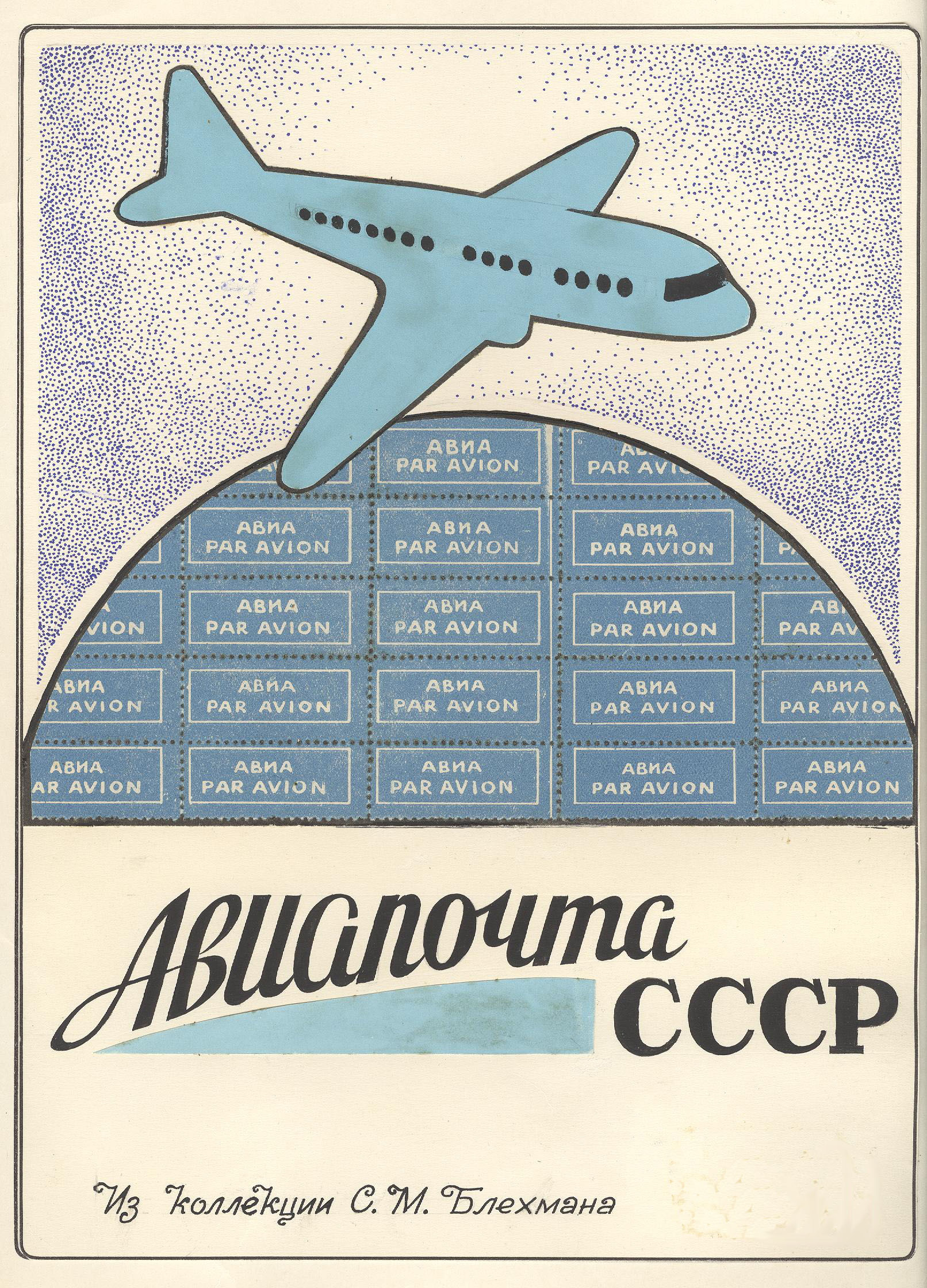
Title page of the Blekhman's philatelic exposition "Airmail of the USSR"

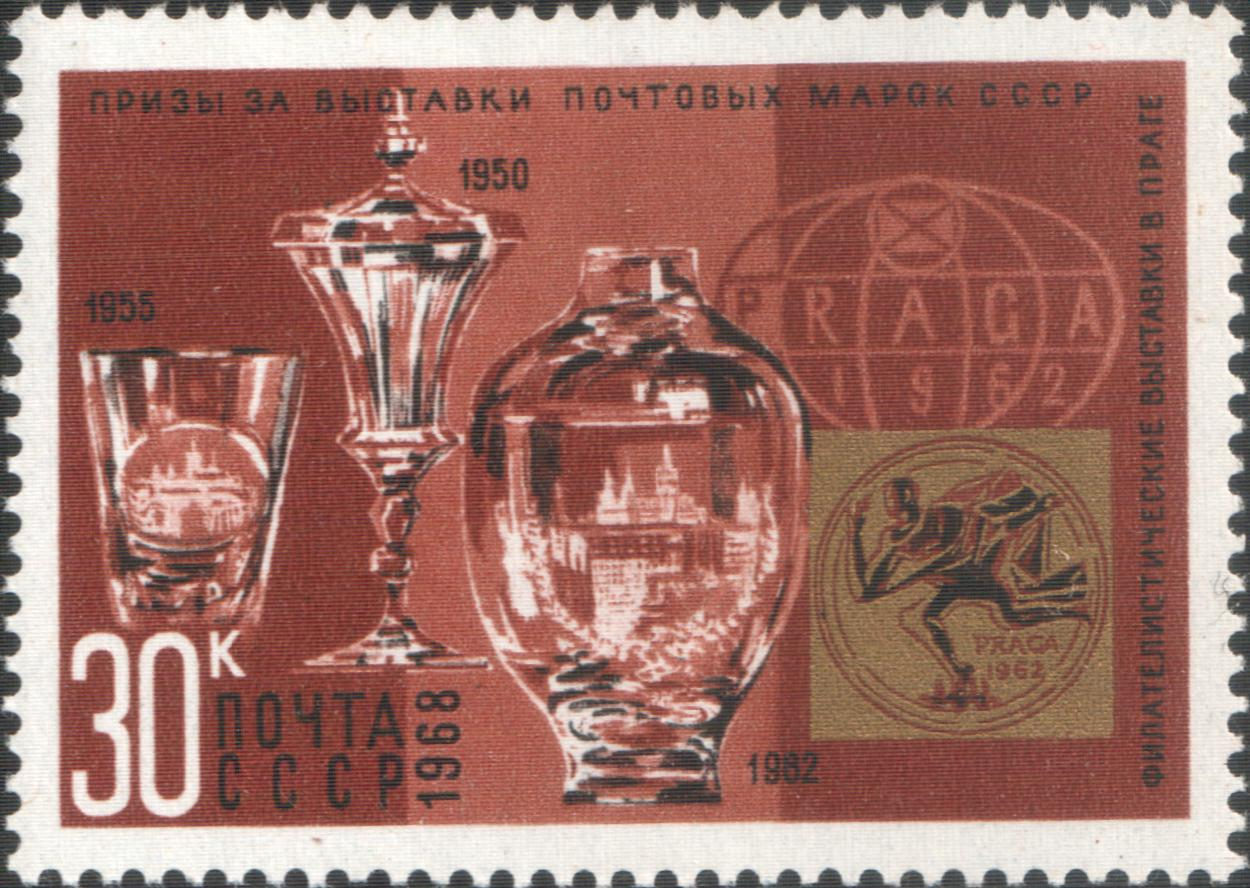
Silver-plated plaquette (bottom right) awarded Blekhman at the World Stamp Exhibition "Praga 1962" for the book "Cataloging Postage Stamps of Tuva" and shown on the 1968 Soviet stamp

== See also ==
- Postage stamps and postal history of Tannu Tuva
- Rossica Society of Russian Philately
