= Ludvig Lindberg =

Ludvig Lindberg (1873 St. Petersburg – c. 1939) was an accountant and philatelist who formed a world-class collection of the early stamps of Finland. Before the Russian revolution, he sent the most important parts of his collection to Sweden for safe-keeping and he followed himself in February 1918. His Finland collection was said to have been rivalled only by Agathon Fabergé. The Lindberg collection was disposed of in sales by the firm of Heinrich Kohler in 1927 and by Bela Sekula in 1928 and 1929.
