= Postage stamps and postal history of Tannu Tuva =

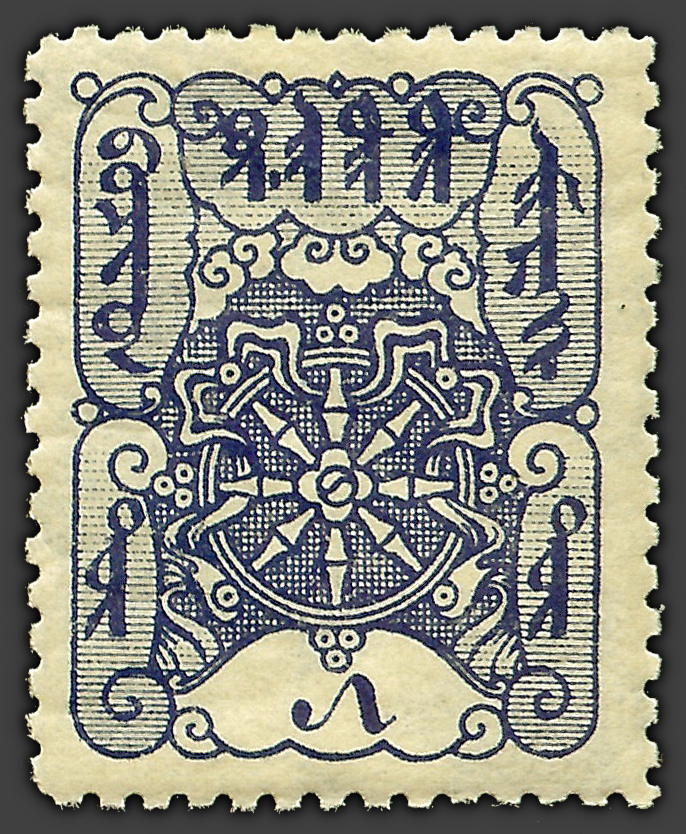
Tuva stamp (wheel of life) 1926

The Tuvan People's Republic issued postage stamps between 1926 and 1936. They were popular with stamp collectors in the Western world in the mid-twentieth century because of the obscurity and exoticism of Tannu Tuva and the stamps' quirky, colorful designs. The validity of many stamps purportedly issued by Tannu Tuva has been questioned by philatelists.

== Background ==
Tuva was a country in central Asia between Russia and Mongolia, which in 1921, under Soviet instigation, became the Tuvan People's Republic. A treaty between the Soviet Union and the Mongolian People's Republic in 1926 affirmed the country's independence, although no other countries formally recognized it. In 1944, it was annexed to the Soviet Union as part of the Tuvan Autonomous Oblast and in 1961 became the Tuva Autonomous Soviet Socialist Republic. Its successor since 1992, the Tuvan Republic, is a member of the Russian Federation.

== Postage stamps ==
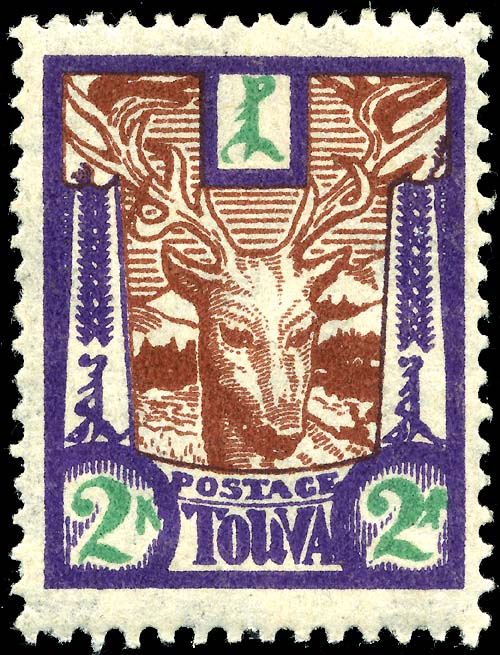
Tuva stamp (stag) 1927

The first Tuvan stamps were issued in 1926. The first series depicted the Buddhist wheel of life with Mongolian writing and numerals only. Beginning in 1927, Tannu Tuva issued a series of color stamps with local scenes or a map of the country. These stamps were issued in several shapes, including rectangles, triangles and diamonds, and bore text in Mongolian and the words "TOUVA" and "postage".

From 1934 to 1936, Tuva issued about 100 different postage stamps with exotic images of Tuvan life, including horse racing, nomadic battle scenes, and domestic animals including camels and oxen. These large format stamps came in a variety of shapes including diamonds, and were widely sold to collectors in canceled-to-order form.

According to one source, these stamps were the brainchild of Bela Sekula, a promoter of philatelic "rarities", who in 1934 convinced the Tuvan and Soviet authorities to manufacture exotic stamps to sell to collectors. They were in fact "designed in Moscow, printed in Moscow, franked in Moscow and sold abroad by a Moscow state trading firm to earn hard currency for Moscow."

Nor were all the images on the stamps accurate representations of Tuvan life. One of the stamps, for example, depicted a camel racing a locomotive along Tuva's non-existent railway. In fact, there is still no railway in Tuva. Another stamp showed a large airship with a man on horseback below, reflecting Soviet enthusiasm for airships between the World Wars. There is no evidence that an airship visited Tuva at that time.

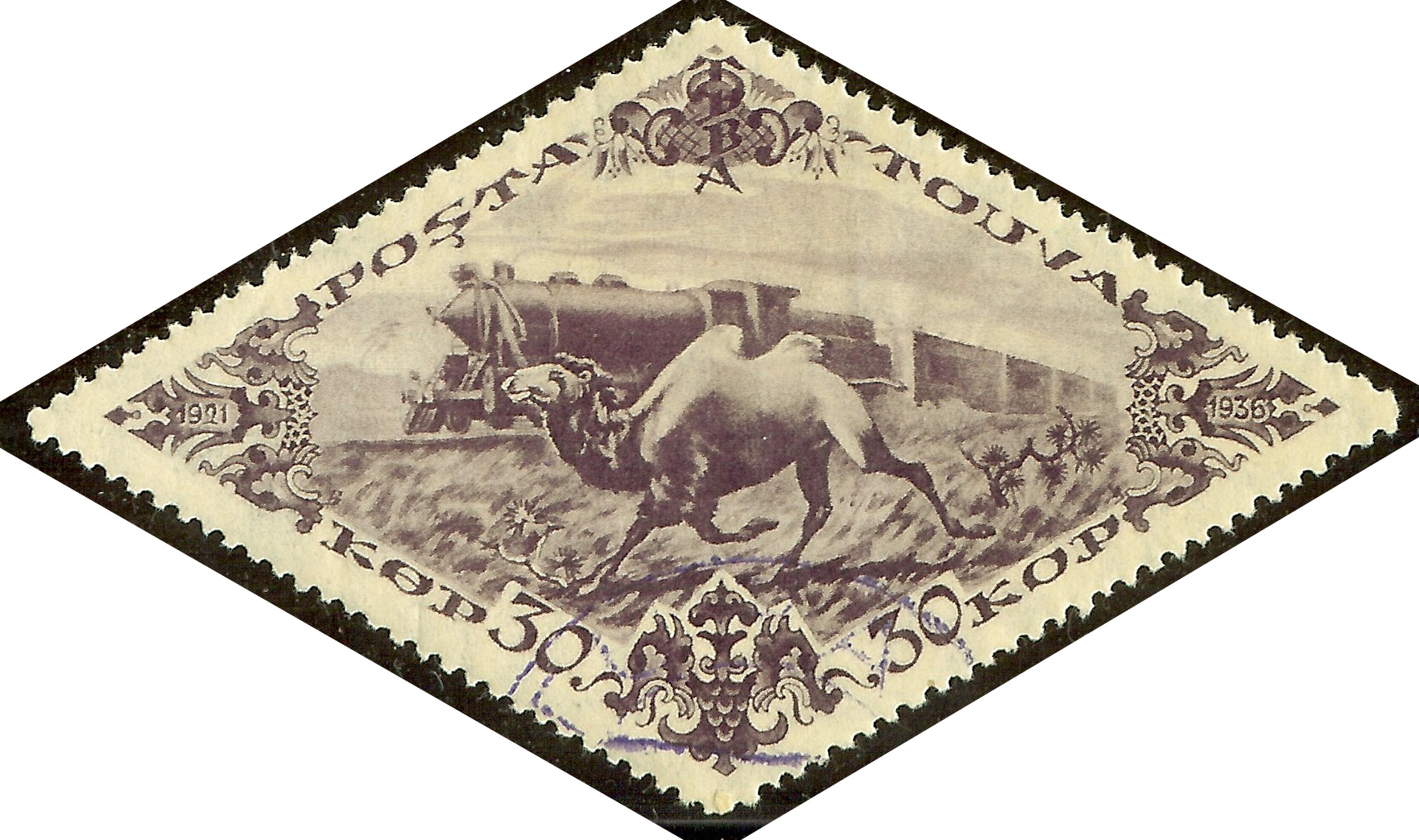
Tuva "stamp" (camel "racing" locomotive) 1936

The standing of the Tannu Tuva stamps has been controversial with some catalogues formerly not listing Tuvan stamps, however, all the major catalogues now include the stamps while noting the existence of many canceled-to-order stamps. Philatelists contend that early Tuvan stamps did see limited postal use and covers do exist. Philatelic literature such as The Postal History and Stamps of Tuva by S.M. Blekhman also confirms non-philatelic commercial use of the stamps.

Notwithstanding their questionable origins, these exotic stamps were popular with young collectors during the middle of the twentieth century. This is documented, for example, in Tuva or Bust!, Richard Feynman's Last Journey by Ralph Leighton (W.W. Norton & Co., 1991), where childhood memories of the colorful stamps of Tannu Tuva inspired Nobel Prize winning physicist Richard Feynman and the author on a quest, first to contact someone in Tuva, and then to actually visit the country. Feynman died before achieving his goal, but Leighton ultimately reached Tuva. Leighton and Feynman's efforts rekindled an interest in Tuva and its stamps, which now are the subject of numerous websites.

== Illegal stamps ==
Since the 1990s, numerous labels purporting to be postage stamps of Tuva have appeared on the market. They have depicted a variety of unlikely Tuvan subjects, such as Bart Simpson, the Teletubbies and Led Zeppelin, and are all illegal stamps apparently intended to deceive collectors.

== Revenue stamps ==
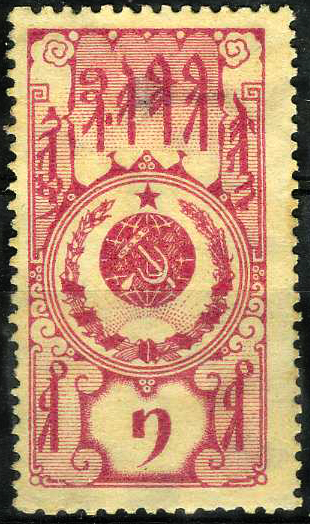
A 1926 Tuvan revenue stamp

While the status of many Tuvan postage stamps is disputed, a number of revenue stamps were issued for Tuva in 1926, whose status is not in doubt.

== References and sources ==
Notes

Sources

- Blekhman, Samuel (Eng. trans. by Ron Hogg). (1997) The Postal History and Stamps of Tuva. Woodbridge, VA: Scientific Consulting Services Int.
- Mirr, Albert J. (1995) Tannu Tuva Catalog. Tannu Tuva Collectors Society Inc.
- Young, Ian (2003). "Whatever Happened to Tannu Touva?", American Philatelist, Vol. 117, No. 1, January 2003.
