= Stepan Saryg-Ool =

Stepan Agbanovich Saryg-Ool (Russian: Степан Агбанович Сарыг-Оол; Tuvan: Степан Агбаан оглу Сарыг-оол; 17 November 1908 – 27 May 1983) was a Soviet Tuvan poet, writer, folklore specialist, and politician.

== Biography ==
Stepan Saryg-Ool was born in the rural locality of Torgalyg in 1908. His first writing was published in the Tuvan People's Republic in 1934.

A founding figure in Tuvan literature, Saryg-Ool wrote poems, short stories, and the two-volume autobiographical novel Novel About A Bright Boy.

He was a member of the Tuvan People's Revolutionary Party and joined the Communist Party of the Soviet Union upon Tuva's absorption by the Soviet Union as the Russian Soviet Federative Socialist Republic's Tuvan Autonomous Soviet Socialist Republic (Tuvan ASSR) in 1944. A delegate to the Supreme Soviet of the Tuvan ASSR, he was elected a member of the Presidium of the Supreme Soviet in 1967.

He was awarded the honorary title of People's Writer of the Tuvan ASSR in 1973.

He died in 1983.
