= Kantegir =

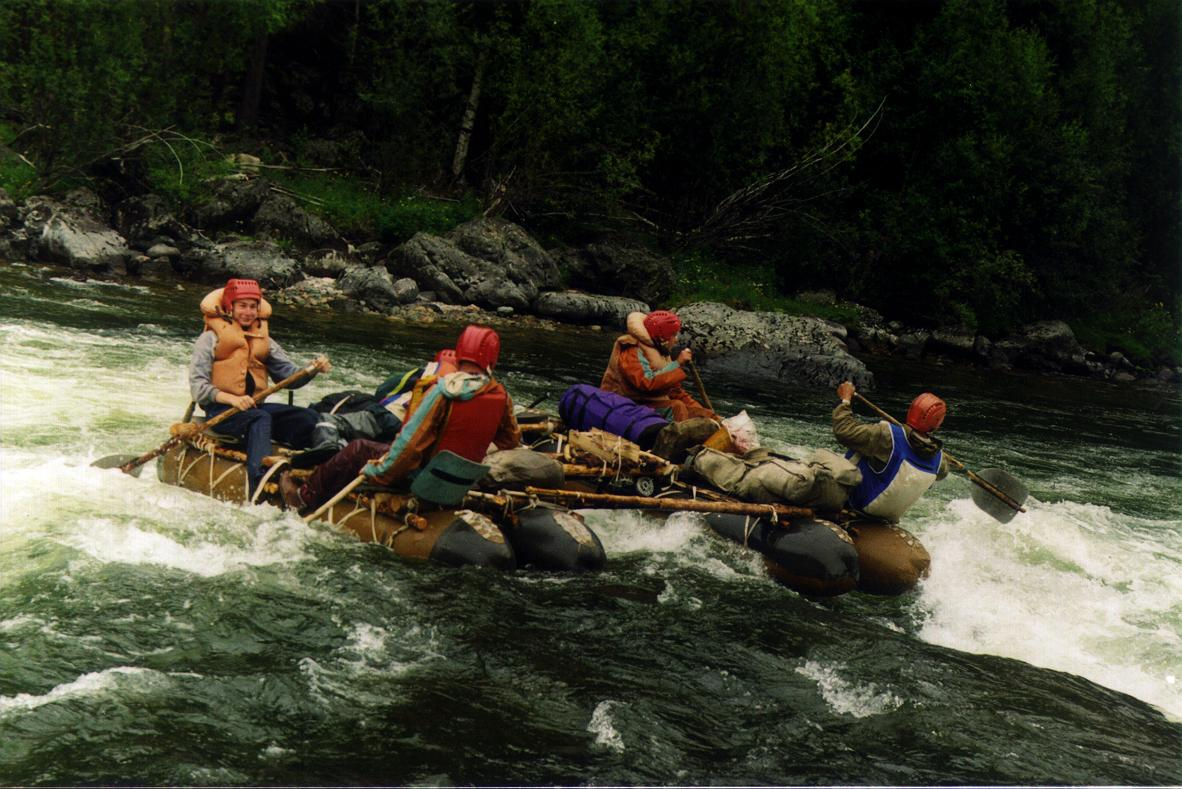

Location
- Country: Russia

Physical characteristics
- Mouth: Yenisey
  - coordinates: 52.7258°N 91.3173°E
- Length: 209 km (130 mi)
- Basin size: 5,400 km^{2} (2,100 sq mi)

Basin features
- Progression: Yenisey→ Kara Sea

The Kantegir (Russian: Кантегир; Khakas: Хан-Тигір, romanized: Xan-Tigĕr) is a left tributary of the Yenisey in Siberia, Russia. It begins on the northern slopes of the ridge Saylyg-Khem-Taiga, the Republic of Tyva. It is 209 kilometres (130 mi) long, and has a drainage basin of 5,400 square kilometres (2,100 sq mi).

Kantegir is a river with an average fall of 4.5 m/km, it is one of the most beautiful rivers of the Western Sayan mountains. It flows in virtually unpopulated terrain in the area of black coniferous taiga. Scenic mountain top Kantegira heavily indented tributaries and dry padyami with signs of spring watercourses. Taiga covers the rocky shore of the river, climbing to the tops of mountains rising to 100–150 m above the bottom of the valley Kantegirskoy. Valley Kantegira throughout clenched mountains to 100–200 m, the valley slopes are steep, with rocky outcrops of granite, shale, sandstone.
