= Postage stamps and postal history of Ethiopia =

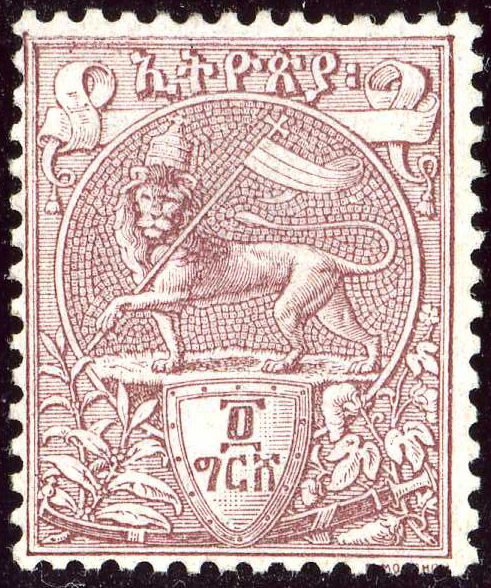
An 1894 stamp of Ethiopia, valid only for local mail

This is a survey of the postage stamps and postal history of Ethiopia. Long an independent state in Africa, messages were originally carried by couriers called méléktegnas, who held the letters attached to a stick.

== British posts in Ethiopia ==
As part of the 1867-8 invasion that culminated in the Battle of Magdala, the British established a field post office at Massawa (then a port of Ethiopia) in November 1867, using stamps of British India. The territory of Harar was taken by Egypt in 1875, and in the following year a post office was established; letters from there used Egyptian stamps canceled with a Maltese cross.

== Establishment of the Ethiopian postal system ==
On 9 March 1894 Menelik II of Ethiopia awarded a concession to Swiss engineer Alfred Ilg to develop a railway including postal services.

Ilg arranged for Frenchman Leon Chefneux to contract with the engraver Louis-Eugène Mouchon to design a set of seven stamps, four depicting Menelik, and three with a heraldic lion. They were printed by Atelier de Fabrication des Timbres-Postes in Paris, along with four values of postcards. Most of the stamps remained in Paris where the dealers Maury had the exclusive right to sell them but 135,000 sets were taken to Ethiopia. The earliest known use is 29 January 1895. These stamps were valid only for local mail and mail to Djibouti.

Initially the tasks of cancelling and forwarding letters were entrusted to the Catholic mission at Harar. After a delay occasioned by the Italian invasion of Ethiopia, Ilg hired several Swiss postal officials and they began organizing a system of postal bags carried by the railway that was being constructed at the same time. The Harrar mission continued to process all mail until 1904, when a post office opened at the newly established town of Dire Dawa.

In the meantime, it was discovered that Ethiopian stamps sold by an agent in France at a discount, for publicity purposes, were being shipped to Ethiopia and used on mail. To prevent this, beginning in 1901, stamps were locally overprinted in different ways each year, and were only valid for postage with the overprint.

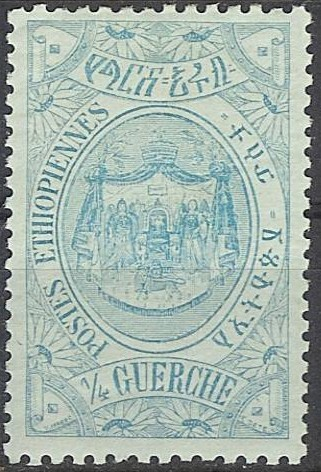
A 1909 stamp of Ethiopia issued as a result of UPU membership and depicting the Throne of Solomon

== UPU membership ==
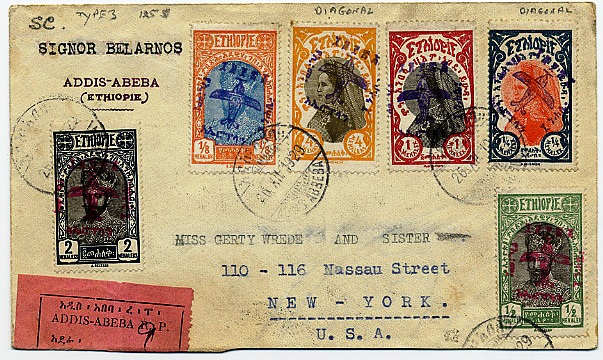
A first flight cover of Ethiopia, 1929

Prior to the admission of Ethiopia to the UPU in 1908, international mail from Ethiopia had to be additionally franked with stamps of UPU members. France operated post offices at Addis Ababa, Harar, and Dire Dawa, using stamps of Obock or the French Somali Coast, and mail is known with a triple franking of Ethiopia, British Somaliland (via the town of Zeila), and Aden.

The first stamps of Ethiopia valid for international mail were a 1 November 1908 set of overprinted stamps of the first issue. A further issue was required in new designs in 1909 which, in addition to Amharic, included the Latin inscription "POSTES ETHIOPIENNES" and the value in guerches. The older issues lost postal validity and the use of French Somali Coast stamps on mail sent abroad was discontinued as a result of the admission to the U.P.U., and that meant that Ethiopia could send mail to any country on earth.

The coronation of Zewditu I of Ethiopia and regency of Prince Tafari was marked in 1917 by overprints on the 1909 stamps. In 1919, a new definitive series of fifteen stamps included portraits of Zewditu and Tafari, along with various native animals, and inscribed "ETHIOPIE".

In 1928, a set of ten stamps depicting Tafari and Zewditu was issued and soon after overprinted, first to mark the opening of the General Post Office in Addis Ababa, and a month later for the coronation of Tafari, the latter overprint including the phrase "NEGOUS TEFERI" in Latin letters. Overprints in 1930 commemorated first the proclamation and then coronation of Tafari as "Haile Selassie", followed by a series of seven stamps depicting the coronation monument and various symbols of empire.

== Italian occupation ==
In 1935, Italy invaded Ethiopia, annexing it the following year and declaring King Victor Emmanuel III Emperor of Ethiopia. In May 1936, Italy issued seven colonial stamps inscribed "ETIOPIA" and depicting Victor Emmanuel.

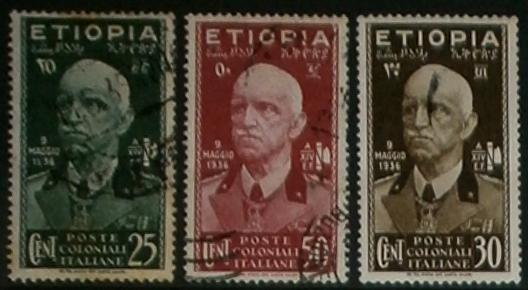
Italian Ethiopia stamps depicting Victor Emmanuel III as the Emperor

Three stamps featuring the image of Emperor Victor Emmanuel III were issued on 22 May 1936. Later in the year, four additional stamps were issued, also featuring Victor Emmanuel with the scenery of Ethiopia in the background. All of these stamps were inscribed in Italian, Arabic and Amharic, and marked "9 May 1936" to take note of the date Ethiopia was annexed by Italy.

Ethiopia was then incorporated in Italian East Africa with Eritrea and Italian Somaliland until the territory was liberated in 1941. These series were replaced by the stamps of Italian East Africa on 7 February 1938.

== Post-liberation ==
The first stamps after liberation were a series of three of 1942 depicting Haile Selassie, with the denomination printed in lower case, and reissued as a set of eight three months later, with the denomination in all capitals. Subsequent issues typically, though not always, included a portrait oval of Haile Selassie in the design up to the 1960s.

In 1974, the Ethiopian monarchy was overthrown by the Derg, a communist military junta backed by the Soviet Union. In 1987, the Derg established the People's Democratic Republic of Ethiopia.

The communist government was overthrown in 1991 and replaced by the Federal Democratic Republic of Ethiopia.

== See also ==
- Ethiopian Postal Service

== References and sources ==
Sources

- Ader, Ivan. Handbook of the Postage Stamps of the Empire of Ethiopia and Her Postal System. Stockholm: David Broberg, 1961.
- Migliavacca, Giorgio An Introduction to the Stamps of Ethiopia, pp 48, Virginstamps.com, 2011, St. Thomas VI 00801-0007
- Rossiter, Stuart & John Flower. The Stamp Atlas. London: Macdonald, 1986. ISBN 0-356-10862-7
