= Tuva =

Republic of Russia

Republic of Tyva Республика Тыва (Russian)
- Republic

Other transcription(s)
  - Tuvan: Тыва Республика
  - Romanization: Tıva Respublika
- Flag Coat of arms
- Anthem: "Men – tyva men"
- Coordinates: 51°47′N 94°45′E
- Country: Russia
- Federal district: Siberian
- Economic region: East Siberian
- Established: 31 March 1992
- Capital: Kyzyl

Government
  - Body: Great Khural
  - Head: Vladislav Khovalyg

Area
  - Total: 168,604 km^{2} (65,098 sq mi)
  - Rank: 21st

Population (2021 census)
  - Total: 336,651: 88.7% Tuvans; 10.1% Russians; 0.1% Khakas; 1.1% other
  - Estimate (2018): 321,722
  - Rank: 76th
  - Density: 1.99670/km^{2} (5.17142/sq mi)
  - Urban: 54.6%
  - Rural: 45.4%

GDP (nominal, 2024)
  - Total: ₽123 billion (US$1.44 billion)
  - Per capita: ₽363,158 (US$4,261.37)
- Time zone: UTC+7 (MSK+4)
- ISO 3166 code: RU-TY
- License plates: 17
- OKTMO ID: 93000000
- Official languages: Russian; Tuvan
- Website: rtyva.ru

- People: Тывалар (Tyvalar)
- Language: Тыва дыл (Tyva dyl)
- Country: Тыва (Tyva)

Tuva

Mongolian name
- Mongolian Cyrillic: Тува
Transcriptions
- SASM/GNC: Tuvagiin

Russian name
- Russian: Тыва
- Romanization: Tyva

Tuvan Cyrillic name
- Tuvan Cyrillic: Тыва Республика

Tuvan Latin name
- Tuvan Latin: Tyva Respublika

Tuva (Note: /ˈtuːvə/; Russian: Тува [tʊˈva]) or Tyva, (Note: /ˈtɪvə/; Tuvan: Тыва [tʰɤ̀ʋɐ]; Russian pronunciation: [tɨˈva]) officially the Republic of Tyva, (Note: Russian: Республика Тыва, romanized: Respublika Tyva, IPA: [rʲɪˈspublʲɪkə tɨˈva]; Tuvan: Тыва Республика, romanized: Tıva Respublika, IPA: [tʰɤ̀ʋɐ rʲɪ̀spúblʲɪkə]) is a republic of Russia. Tuva lies at the geographical center of Asia, in southern Siberia. The republic borders the federal subjects of the Altai Republic, Buryatia, Irkutsk Oblast, Khakassia, and Krasnoyarsk Krai, and shares an international border with Mongolia to the south. Tuva has a population of 336,651 (2021 census). Its capital city is Kyzyl, in which more than a third of the population reside.

Starting in the medieval period, Tuva was controlled by a series of Chinese dynasties and nomadic khanates. In 1758, Tuva came under the Qing dynasty, the last imperial dynasty of China, as the Tannu Uriankhai region of Outer Mongolia. Tuva broke away as the Uryankhay Republic following the 1911 Xinhai Revolution that created the Republic of China. In 1914 it became the Russian protectorate of Uryankhay Krai, and in 1921 was replaced by the nominally independent Tuvan People's Republic (known officially as Tannu Tuva until 1926), recognized only by its neighbors the Soviet Union and Mongolia, before being annexed into the former's Russian Soviet Federative Socialist Republic in 1944. In 1990, during the dissolution of the Soviet Union, a wave of separatist violence against ethnic Russians triggered an exodus and OMON special police deployment.

As of 2021, ethnic Tuvans make up 88.7% of the population. They speak the Tuvan language as their native tongue. Ethnic Russians make up 10.1% and speak the Russian language. Both languages are official and widely understood in the republic. The Great Khural is the regional parliament of Tuva. As of 2012, 61.8% adhere to Buddhism, and 8% to Tengrism or Tuvan shamanism.

== History ==
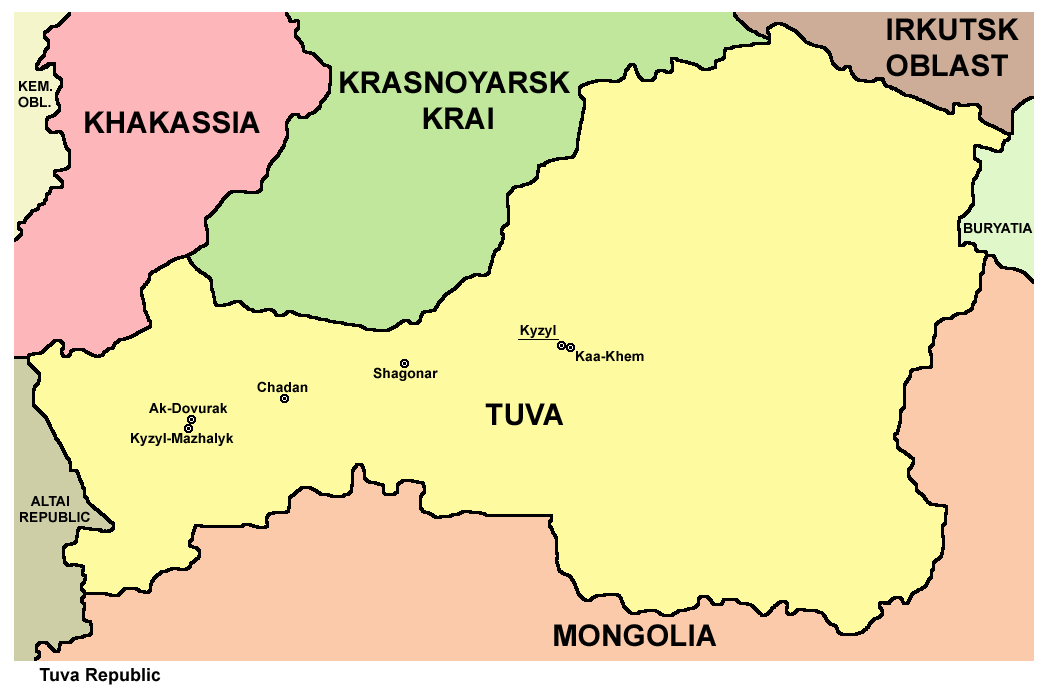
Map of the Tuva Republic

The territory of Tuva has been controlled by the Xiongnu (209 BC – 93 AD) and the Xianbei state (93–234), Rouran Khaganate (330–555), Tang dynasty (647–682), Yenisei Kyrgyz Khaganate (7th–13th century), Mongol Empire (1206–1271), Yuan dynasty (1271–1368), Northern Yuan dynasty (1368–1691), Khotgoid Khanate and Zunghar Khanate (1634–1758). Medieval Mongol tribes, including Oirats and Tumeds, inhabited areas which are now part of the Tuvan Republic.

From 1758 to 1911, Tuva was part of China's Qing dynasty and administered by Outer Mongolia. During the Xinhai Revolution in China, Tsarist Russia formed a separatist movement among the Tuvans while there were also pro-independence and pro-Mongol groups. Tsar Nicholas II agreed to the third petition by Tuva's leadership in 1912, establishing a protectorate over the then-independent state. Some Russians, such as merchants, travellers, and explorers, had already settled in Tuva at that time. Tuva became nominally independent as the Uryankhay Republic before being turned into a Russian protectorate as Uryankhay Krai under Tsar Nicholas II, on 17 April 1914.

A Tuvan capital was established, called Belotsarsk (Белоца́рск; literally, "(Town) of the White Tsar"). Meanwhile, in 1911, with the collapse of the Qing, Mongolia seceded from China, entering Russia's sphere of influence. Following the Russian Revolution of 1917 that ended the imperial autocracy, most of Tuva was occupied from 5 July 1918 to 15 July 1919 by Alexander Kolchak's White Russian troops. Pyotr Ivanovich Turchaninov was named governor of the territory. In the autumn of 1918, the southwestern part was occupied by Chinese troops and the southern part by Mongol troops led by Khatanbaatar Magsarjav.

From July 1919 to February 1920, the communist Red Army controlled Tuva but from 19 February 1920 to June 1921 it was occupied by China (governor was Yan Shichao [traditional, Wade–Giles transliteration: Yan Shi-ch'ao]), until their expulsion by the Bolsheviks in 1921. On 14 August 1921, the Bolsheviks established the Tuvan People's Republic, popularly called Tannu-Tuva. In 1926, the capital (Belotsarsk; Khem-Beldyr since 1918) was renamed Kyzyl, meaning "red". The Tuvan People's Republic was de jure an independent state between the World Wars. The state's ruler, Chairman Donduk Kuular, sought to strengthen ties with Mongolia and establish Tibetan Buddhism as the state religion. This unsettled the Soviet Union, which orchestrated a coup carried out in 1929 by five young Tuvan graduates of Moscow's Communist University of the Toilers of the East.

In 1930, the pro-Soviet regime discarded the state's Mongol script in favor of a Latin alphabet designed for Tuva by Russian linguists. In 1943, Cyrillic script replaced Latin. Under the leadership of Party Secretary Salchak Toka, ethnic Russians were granted full citizenship rights and Buddhist and Mongol influences on the Tuvan state and society were systematically curtailed.

Tuva was annexed by the Soviet Union in 1944, with the approval of Tuva's Little Khural (parliament), but without a referendum on the issue. It became the Tuvan Autonomous Oblast, within the Russian Soviet Federative Socialist Republic, after the Soviet victory in World War II. Salchak Toka, leader of the Tuvan People's Revolutionary Party, was given the title of First Secretary of the Tuvan Communist Party and became the de facto ruler of Tuva until his death in 1973. The territory became the Tuvan Autonomous Soviet Socialist Republic on 10 October 1961.

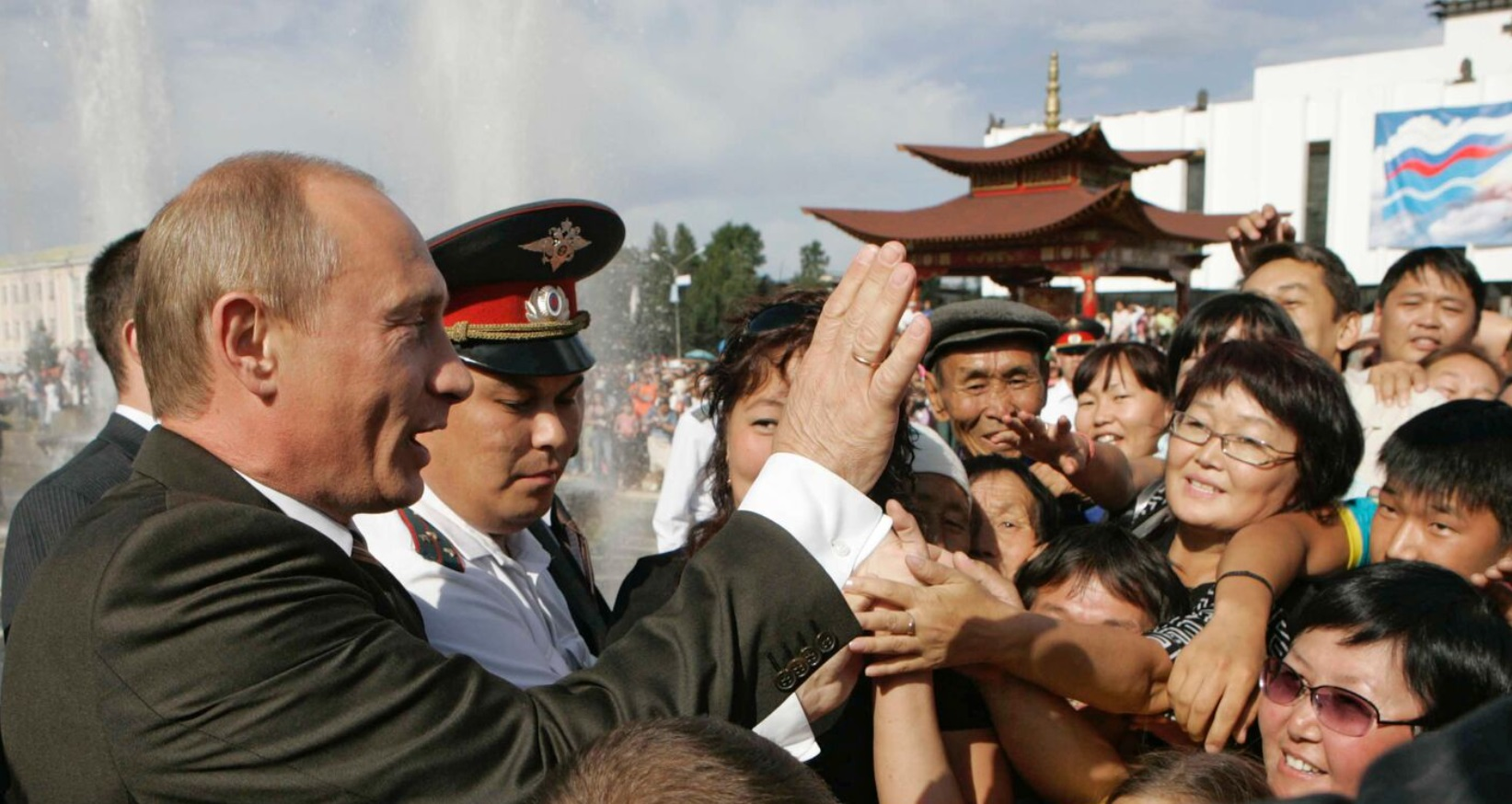
Russian President Vladimir Putin in Tuva in 2007

In February 1990, the Khostug Tyva (Tuvan Democratic Movement) was founded by Kaadyr-ool Bicheldei, a philologist at the Kyzyl State Pedagogical Institute. The party aimed to provide jobs and housing (both in short supply), and improve the status of the Tuvan language and culture. It called for the upgrading of Tuva to a full republic of the Soviet Union, and later for an independence referendum. Later in the year, there was a wave of attacks against Tuva's sizeable Russian community, including sniper attacks on trucks, and attacks on outlying settlements, with 168 reportedly murdered. Russian OMON special police units were eventually called in. For supporting the 1991 Soviet coup attempt, the Tuvan local government was forced to resign. Many Russians moved out of the republic during this period. Historian Mark Beissinger attributed the failure of the Tuvan nationalist movement, compared to contemporary movements across the Soviet Union, to the movement's weaker urban networks. Tuva has remained remote and difficult to access.

Tuva was a signatory to the 31 March 1992 treaty that created the Russian Federation. On 22 October 1993, a new constitution was drawn up for the republic, creating a 32-member parliament (Supreme Khural) and a Grand Khural, which deals with local legislation. The constitution was approved by 53.9% (62.2% according to another source) of Tuvans in a referendum on 12 December 1993. At the same time, the official name was changed from Tuva (Тува) to Tyva (Тыва).

== Geography ==
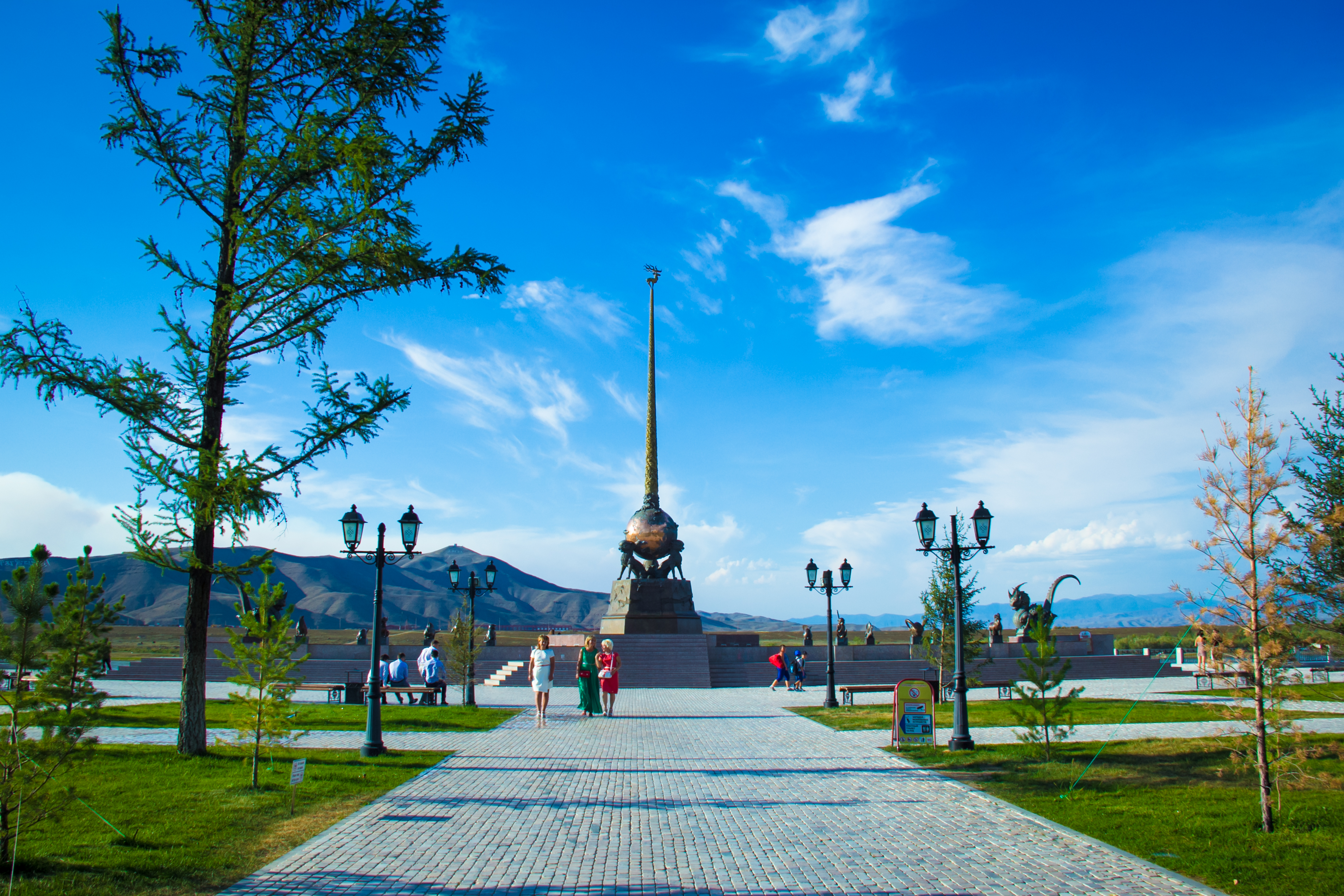
The geographic "center of Asia", 2015

The Tyva Republic is situated in the far south of Siberia. Its capital city is Kyzyl, located near the geographic "center of Asia". The eastern part of the republic is forested and elevated, while the western part is a drier lowland.

- Borders:
  - internal: Khakassia (NW/N), Krasnoyarsk Krai (N), Irkutsk Oblast (N/NE), Buryatia (E), Altai Republic (SW/W)
  - international: Mongolia (Bayan-Ölgii Province, Khövsgöl Province, Uvs Province and Zavkhan Province) (S) (border line length: 1,305 kilometers (811 mi))
- Highest point: Mount Mongun-Tayga, 3,970 meters (13,020 ft)
- Maximum N–S distance: 450 kilometers (280 mi)
- Maximum E–W distance: over 700 kilometers (430 mi)
- Area: 170,427 square kilometers (65,802 sq mi)

=== Rivers ===
There are over 8,000 rivers in the Tuvan Republic, including the upper course of the Yenisei River, the fifth longest river in the world. Most of the republic's rivers are Yenisei tributaries. There are also numerous mineral springs in the area.

Major rivers include:

- Yenisei River (also called Ulug-Khem)
- Kantegir River
- Khemchik River
- Maly Yenisei River (also called Ka-Khem or Kaa-Khem)
- Upper Yenisei River (also called Biy-Khem or Bii-Khem)

=== Lakes ===
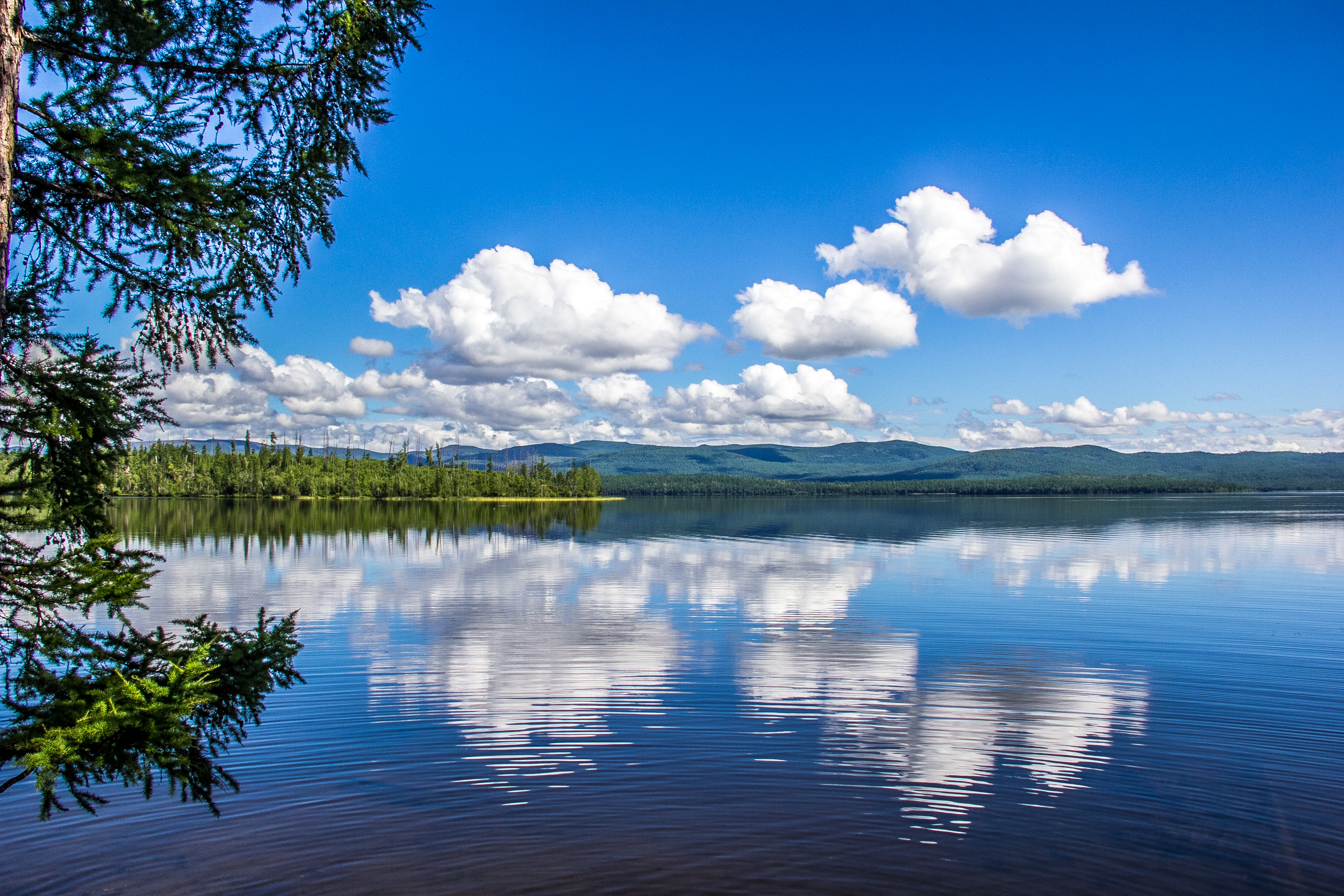
Azas Lake

There are numerous lakes in Tuva, many of which are glacial and salt lakes, including Todzha Lake, a.k.a. Azas Lake (100 km^{2}) – the largest in the republic, and Uvs Lake (shared with Mongolia and a World Heritage Site).

=== Mountains ===
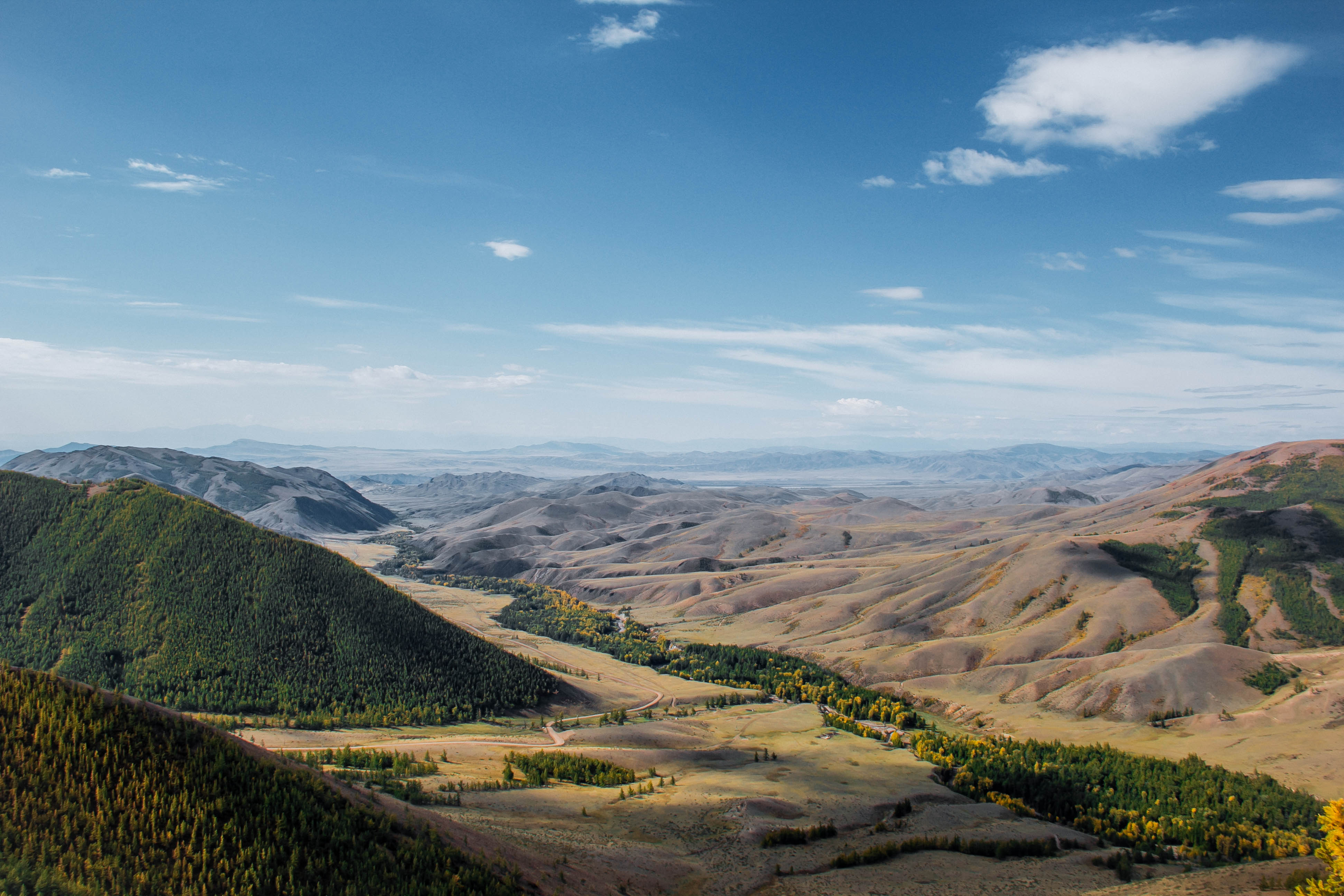
Mountains of Tuva

The Tuva Republic is made up of a mountain basin, about 600 metres or 2,000 feet in altitude, encircled by the Sayan and Tannu-Ola mountain ranges. Mountains and hills cover over 80 percent of its territory. Mongun-Tayga ("Silver Mountain", 3,970 metres or 13,025 feet) is the highest point in the republic and is named after its glacier.

== Demographics ==
Population: 336,651 (2021 census); 307,930 (2010 census); 305,510 (2002 census); 309,129 (1989 Soviet census).

Historical population
| Year | Pop. | ±% |
|---|---|---|
| 1959 | 171,928 | — |
| 1970 | 230,864 | +34.3% |
| 1979 | 266,453 | +15.4% |
| 1989 | 309,129 | +16.0% |
| 2002 | 305,510 | −1.2% |
| 2010 | 307,930 | +0.8% |
| 2021 | 336,651 | +9.3% |
Source: Census data

=== Vital statistics ===
| Years | Average population (×1000) | Live births | Deaths | Natural change | Crude birth rate (per 1000) | Crude death rate (per 1000) | Natural change (per 1000) | Fertility rates |
|---|---|---|---|---|---|---|---|---|
| 1970 | 233 | 6,559 | 1,938 | 4,621 | 28.2 | 8.3 | 19.8 | |
| 1975 | 253 | 6,950 | 2,306 | 4,644 | 27.5 | 9.1 | 18.4 | |
| 1980 | 272 | 7,133 | 2,748 | 4,385 | 26.2 | 10.1 | 16.1 | |
| 1985 | 287 | 8,110 | 2,624 | 5,486 | 28.3 | 9.1 | 19.1 | |
| 1990 | 309 | 8,116 | 2,664 | 5,452 | 26.3 | 8.6 | 17.7 | 3.22 |
| 1991 | 304 | 7,271 | 2,873 | 4,398 | 23.9 | 9.5 | 14.5 | 2.97 |
| 1992 | 303 | 6,545 | 3,006 | 3,539 | 21.6 | 9.9 | 11.7 | 2.68 |
| 1993 | 302 | 6,130 | 3,480 | 2,650 | 20.3 | 11.5 | 8.8 | 2.50 |
| 1994 | 303 | 6,076 | 4,086 | 1,990 | 20.1 | 13.5 | 6.6 | 2.46 |
| 1995 | 304 | 6,172 | 4,010 | 2,162 | 20.3 | 13.2 | 7.1 | 2.47 |
| 1996 | 305 | 5,705 | 4,110 | 1,595 | 18.7 | 13.5 | 5.2 | 2.25 |
| 1997 | 305 | 4,908 | 3,954 | 954 | 16.1 | 12.9 | 3.1 | 1.91 |
| 1998 | 306 | 5,267 | 3,631 | 1,636 | 17.2 | 11.9 | 5.4 | 2.02 |
| 1999 | 306 | 4,894 | 4,142 | 752 | 16.0 | 13.5 | 2.5 | 1.86 |
| 2000 | 306 | 4,871 | 4,170 | 701 | 15.9 | 13.6 | 2.3 | 1.83 |
| 2001 | 305 | 4,992 | 4,165 | 827 | 16.3 | 13.6 | 2.7 | 1.85 |
| 2002 | 305 | 5,727 | 4,576 | 1,151 | 18.8 | 15.0 | 3.8 | 2.10 |
| 2003 | 305 | 6,276 | 4,633 | 1,643 | 20.6 | 15.2 | 5.4 | 2.28 |
| 2004 | 304 | 6,127 | 4,090 | 2,037 | 20.2 | 13.5 | 6.7 | 2.19 |
| 2005 | 303 | 5,979 | 4,326 | 1,653 | 19.8 | 14.3 | 5.5 | 2.11 |
| 2006 | 302 | 5,950 | 3,802 | 2,148 | 19.7 | 12.6 | 7.1 | 2.06 |
| 2007 | 302 | 7,568 | 3,687 | 3,881 | 25.1 | 12.2 | 12.9 | 2.60 |
| 2008 | 303 | 7,874 | 3,526 | 4,348 | 26.0 | 11.6 | 14.3 | 2.68 |
| 2009 | 305 | 8,242 | 3,666 | 4,576 | 27.0 | 12.0 | 15.0 | 2.97 |
| 2010 | 307 | 8,262 | 3,566 | 4,696 | 26.9 | 11.6 | 15.3 | 3.03 |
| 2011 | 308 | 8,478 | 3,403 | 5,075 | 27.5 | 11.0 | 16.5 | 3.25 |
| 2012 | 310 | 8,266 | 3,471 | 4,795 | 26.7 | 11.2 | 15.5 | 3.35 |
| 2013 | 311 | 8,111 | 3,399 | 4,728 | 26.1 | 10.9 | 15.2 | 3.42 |
| 2014 | 313 | 7,921 | 3,419 | 4,502 | 25.3 | 10.9 | 14.4 | 3.48 |
| 2015 | 315 | 7,489 | 3,258 | 4,231 | 23.8 | 10.3 | 13.5 | 3.22 |
| 2016 | 317 | 7,421 | 3,112 | 4,309 | 23.2 | 9.8 | 13.4 | 3.17 |
| 2017 | 320 | 6,977 | 2,788 | 4,189 | 21.9 | 8.7 | 13.2 | 3.03 |
| 2018 | 323 | 6,539 | 2,857 | 3,682 | 20.2 | 8.8 | 11.4 | 2.80 |
| 2019 | 326 | 6,158 | 2,718 | 3,440 | 18.6 | 8.3 | 10.3 | 2.56 |
| 2020 | 330 | 6,582 | 3,024 | 3,601 | 20.0 | 9.2 | 10.8 | 2.78 |
| 2021 | 332 | 6,629 | 3,028 | 3,558 | 20.0 | 9.1 | 10.9 | 2.75 |
| 2022 | | 5,997 | 2,867 | 3,130 | 17.9 | 8.6 | 9.3 | 2.51 |
| 2023 | | 5,738 | 2,986 | 2,752 | 16.9 | 8.8 | 8.1 | 2.44 |
| 2024 | | 5,352 | 3,257 | 2,095 | 15.8 | 9.6 | 6.2 | 2.29 |
| 2025 | | | | | | | | 2.20 |

- Average life expectancy: Tuva: 56.5 (average male and female, UNDP data); Russia: (UN data) Male 59 (world rank 166); Female 73 (127)

=== Ethnic groups ===
According to the 2021 census, Tuvans make up 88.7% of the population. Other groups include Russians (10.1%), and a host of smaller groups, each accounting for less than 0.5% of the total population.

| Ethnic group | 1959 census | | 1970 census | | 1979 census | | 1989 census | | 2002 census | | 2010 census | | 2021 census^{1} | |
| Ethnic group | Number | % | Number | % | Number | % | Number | % | Number | % | Number | % | Number | % |
|---|---|---|---|---|---|---|---|---|---|---|---|---|---|---|
| Tuvans | 97,996 | 57.0% | 135,306 | 58.6% | 161,888 | 60.5% | 198,448 | 64.3% | 235,313 | 77.0% | 249,299 | 82.0% | 279,789 | 88.7% |
| Russians | 68,924 | 40.1% | 88,385 | 38.3% | 96,793 | 36.2% | 98,831 | 32.0% | 61,442 | 20.1% | 49,434 | 16.3% | 31,927 | 10.1% |
| Khakas | 1,726 | 1.0% | 2,120 | 0.9% | 2,193 | 0.8% | 2,258 | 0.7% | 1,219 | 0.4% | 877 | 0.3% | 359 | 0.1% |
| Others | 3,282 | 1.9% | 5,053 | 2.2% | 6,725 | 2.5% | 9,020 | 2.9% | 7,526 | 2.5% | 4,427 | 1.4% | 3,483 | 1.1% |
^{1}21,093 people were registered from administrative databases, and could not declare an ethnicity. It is estimated that the proportion of ethnicities in this group is the same as that of the declared group.

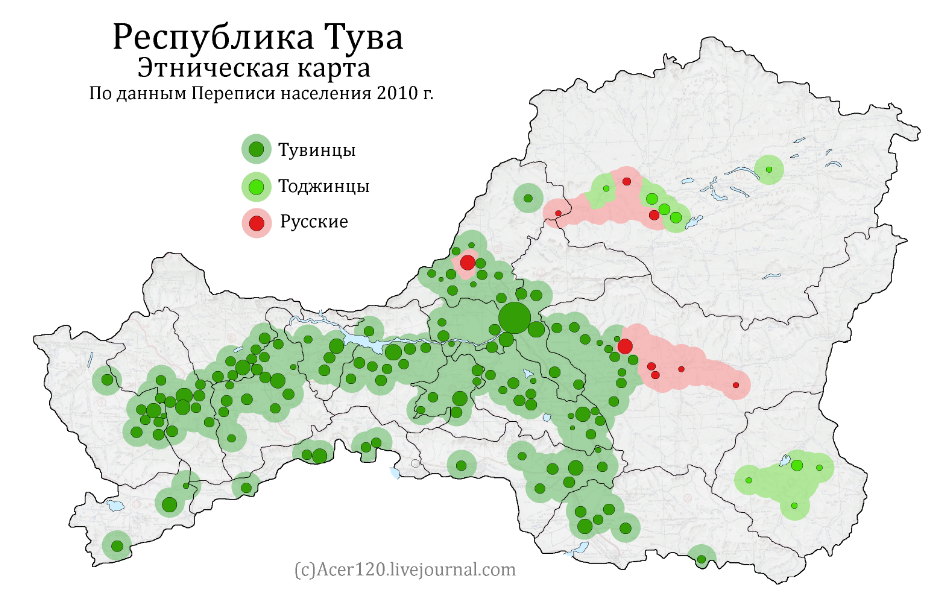
Ethnic map of the Republic of Tuva by settlement, 2010 census. Tuvans Tozhu Tuvans Russians

During the period from 1959 to 2010, there was more than a doubling of ethnic Tuvans. The Russian population growth slowed by the 1980s and decreased by 70% since 1989. The official languages are Tuvan (Turkic) and Russian (Slavic).

Outside Kyzyl, settlements have few if any Russian inhabitants and, in general, Tuvans use their original language as their first language. However, there is a small population of Old Believers in the Republic scattered in some of the most isolated areas. Before Soviet rule, there were a number of large ethnic Russian Old Believer villages, but as atheism spread, the believers moved deeper and deeper into the taiga in order to avoid contact with outsiders. Major Old Believer villages are Erzhei, Uzhep, Unzhei, Zhivei and Bolee Malkiye (all in the Kaa-Khemsky District). Smaller ultra-Orthodox settlements are found further upstream.

Ethnic Russians make up 27.4% of the population (as of the 2021 census) in Kaa-Khemsky District, one of the most remote regions in Tuva. The population is mostly Old Believers. Russians account for 18.9% of the population in Piy-Khemsky and 16.4% in Kyzyl.

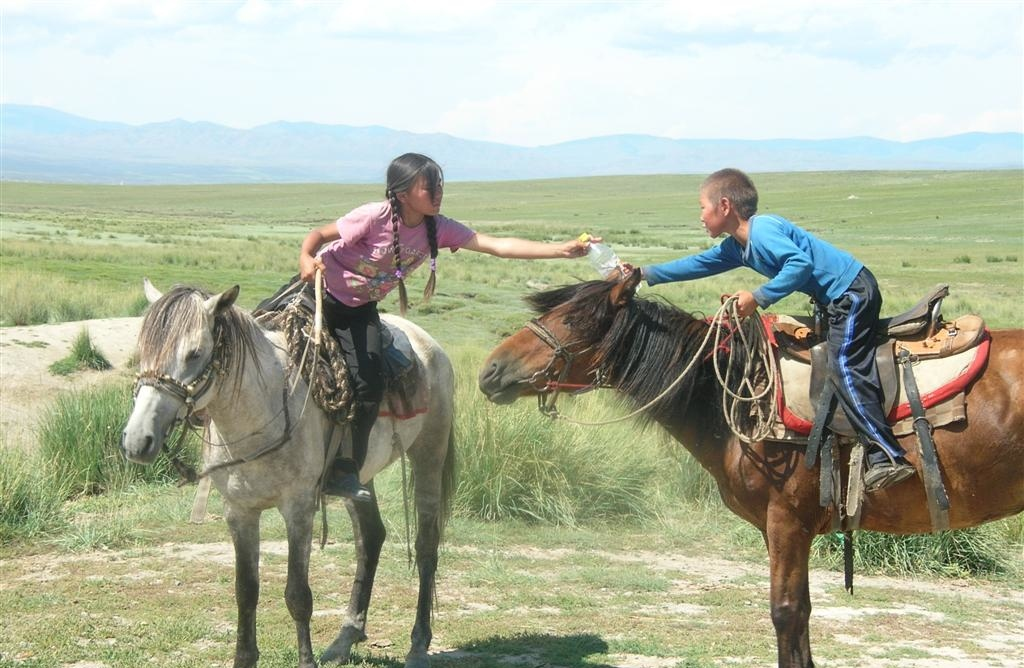
A girl and a boy riding their horses

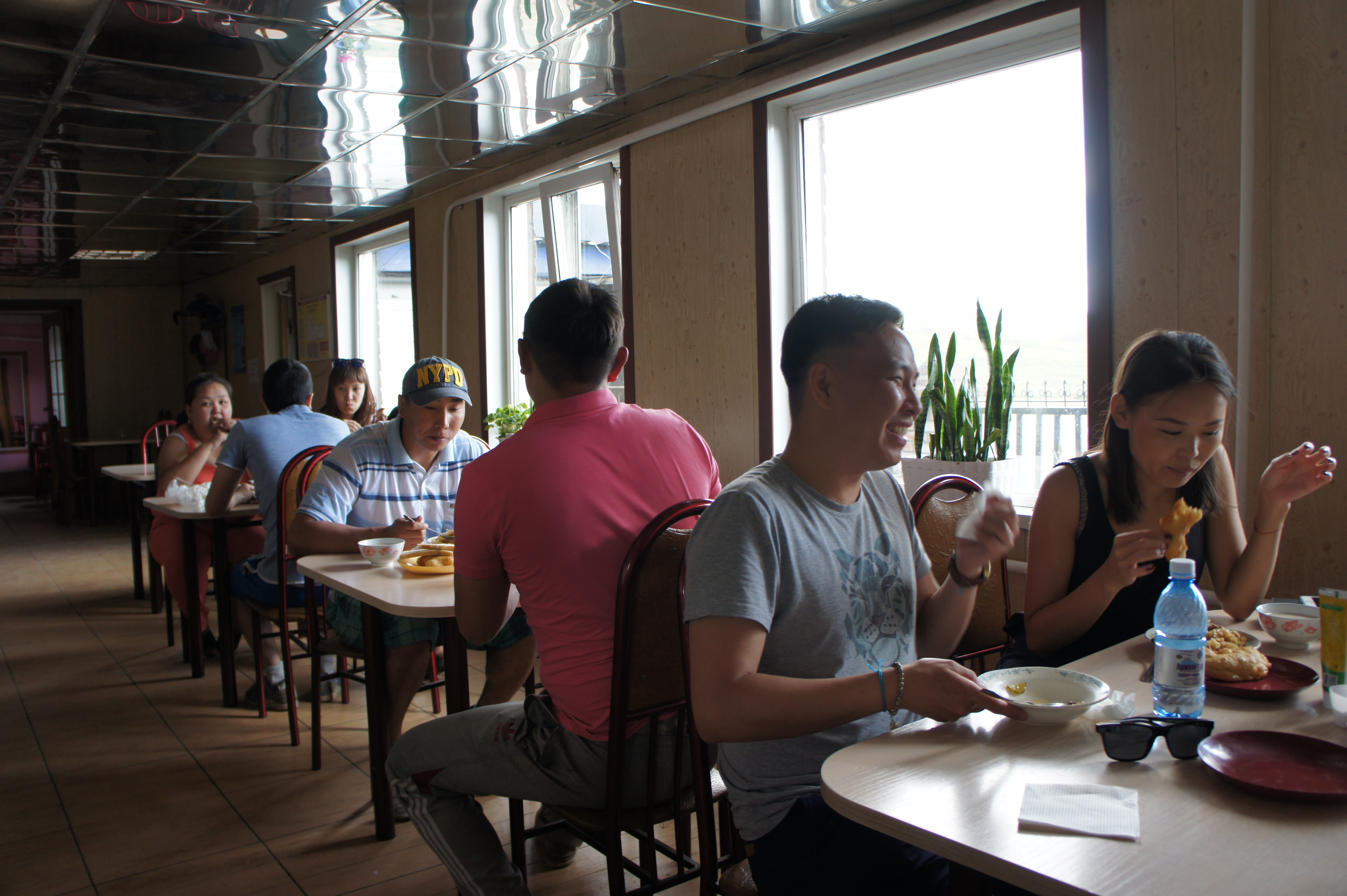
Tuvans in 2016

=== Religion ===
Religion in Tuva as of 2012 (Sreda Arena Atlas)
| Buddhism | 61.8% |
| Atheism and irreligion | 11.8% |
| Tengrism and Tuvan Shamanism | 8% |
| Spiritual but not religious | 7.6% |
| Other and undeclared | 7.2% |
| Other Christians | 1.4% |
| Protestantism | 1.4% |
| Russian Orthodoxy | 0.8% |

Two religions are widespread among the Tuvan people: Tibetan Buddhism and shamanism. Tibetan Buddhism's present-day spiritual leader is Tenzin Gyatso, the fourteenth Dalai Lama. In September 1992, Tenzin Gyatso visited Tuva for three days. On September 20, he blessed and consecrated the yellow-blue-white flag of Tuva, which had been officially adopted three days before.

The Tuvan people – along with the Yellow Uyghurs in China – are one of the only two Turkic groups who are primarily adherents to Tibetan Buddhism, which coexists with native shamanistic traditions.

Tuvans were first exposed to Buddhism during the 13th and 14th centuries, when Tuva entered into the composition of the Mongol Empire. The earliest Buddhist temples uncovered by archaeologists in the territory of Tuva date to the 13th and 14th centuries. During the 16th and 17th centuries, Tibetan Buddhism gained popularity in Tuva. An increasing number of new and restored temples are coming into use, and there has been an upward trend in the number of novices being trained as monks and lamas in recent years. Religious practice declined under the restrictive policies of the Soviet period, but is now flourishing.

According to a 2012 survey, 61.8% of the population of Tuva adheres to Buddhism, 8% to Tengrism or Tuvan shamanism, 1.5% to the Russian Orthodox Church, the Old Believers or other forms of Christianity, 1% to Protestantism. In addition, 7.7% follow other religions or did not give an answer to the survey. 8% of the population declares to be "spiritual but not religious" and 12% to be atheist.

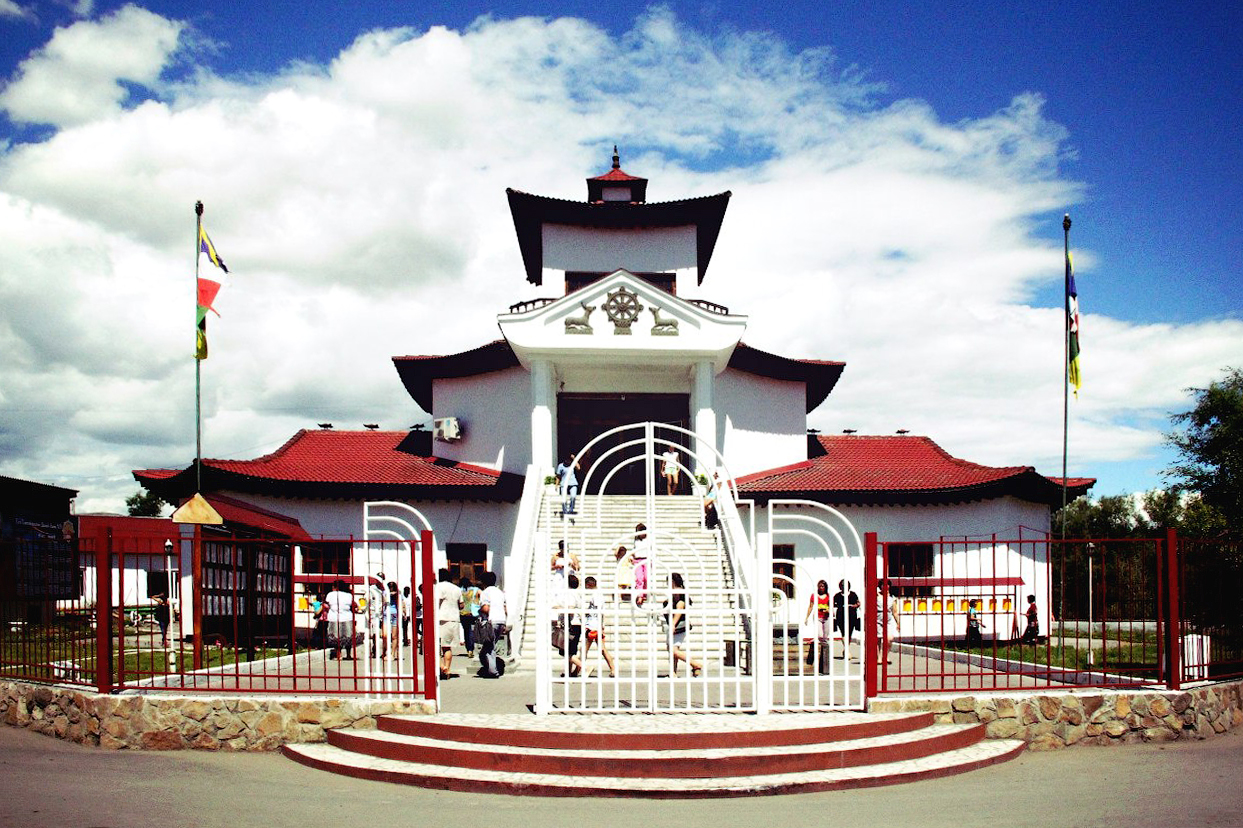
Buddhist temple of Kyzyl (Цеченлиң/Tsechenling)

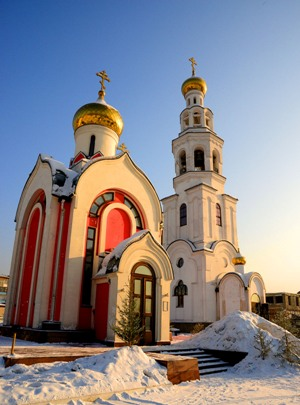
Resurrection Cathedral in Kyzyl

== Politics ==
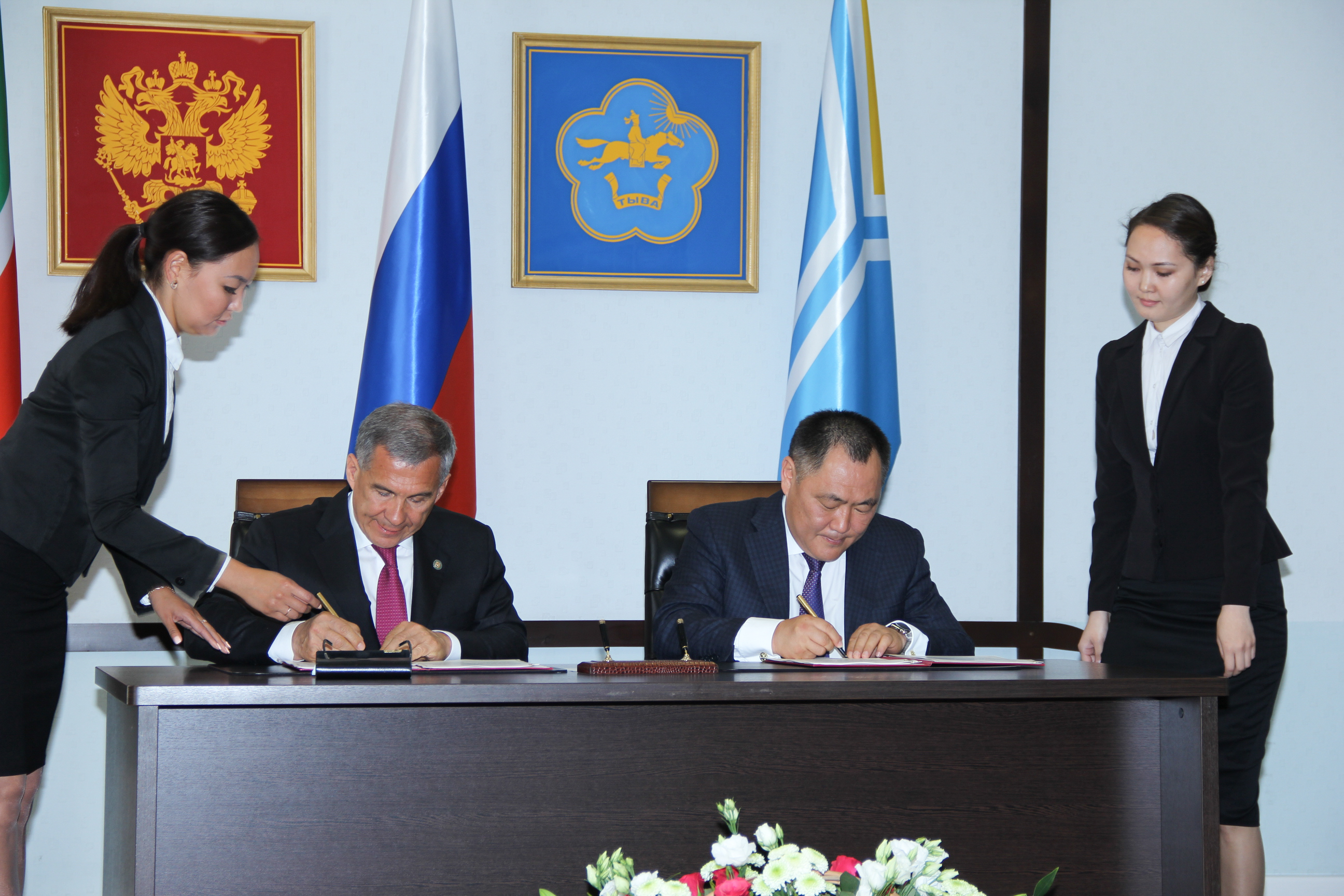
President of the Republic of Tuva Sholban Kara-ool (right) in 2016

The present flag of Tuva – yellow for prosperity, blue for courage and strength, white for purity – was adopted on 17 September 1992. The Republic's Constitution was adopted on 23 October 1993.

The head of Tuva is the chairman of the government and serves a five-year term which can be renewed. The first Chairman of the Government was Sherig-ool Oorzhak. On 3 April 2007, Russian president Vladimir Putin nominated Sholban Kara-ool, 40, a former champion wrestler, as the Chairman of the Government of Tuva. Kara-ool's candidacy was approved by the Khural on 9 April 2007. Kara-ool served from 2007 until 2021. The third and current Tuvan head of government is Vladislav Khovalyg.

Tuva's legislature, the Great Khural, has 32 seats as of 2023; each deputy is elected to serve a five-year term.

In the 2024 Russian presidential election, which critics called rigged and fraudulent, President Vladimir Putin won 95.37% of the vote in Tuva.

== Economy ==
In Tuva, there are a total of approximately 7,400 unemployed, which gives a 5.9% unemployment rate and is above the overall Russian unemployment rate of 4.9%.

=== Mining ===
Mining is a crucial element of the Tuvan economy. The Ulugh-Khem coal basin is located in Tuva. It is estimated that in 2020, there were 40 million metric tonnes of coal produced in Tuva, which accounts for approximately 9.4% of Russia's average annual coal production of 423 million metric tonnes.

== Transportation ==
Tuva is served by Kyzyl Airport. Tuva does not have a railway, however, though famous postage stamps in the 1930s, designed in Moscow during the time of Tuvan independence mistakenly depict locomotives as demonstrating Soviet-inspired progress there. The Kuragino–Kyzyl railway line's completion is targeted for 2035 or later, though this is subject to receiving adequate funding, something that has repeatedly held up progress.

== Culture ==
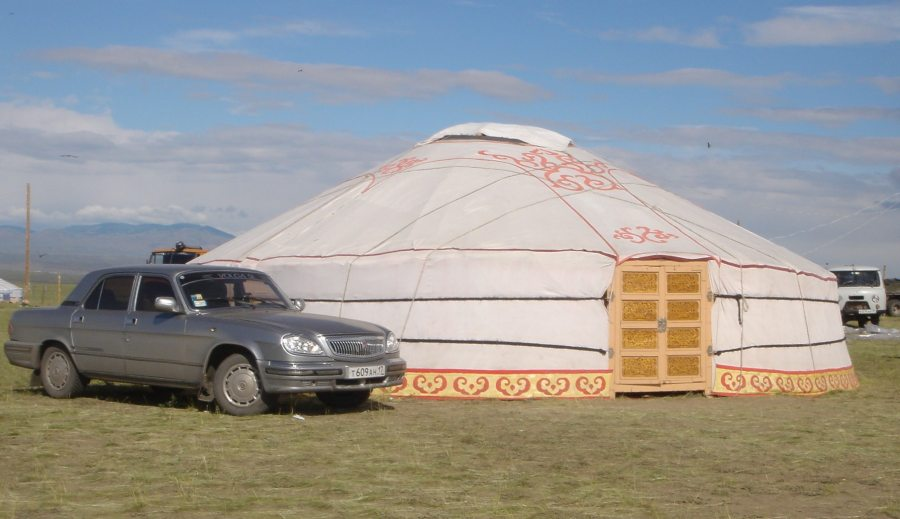
A yurt in Tos Bulak

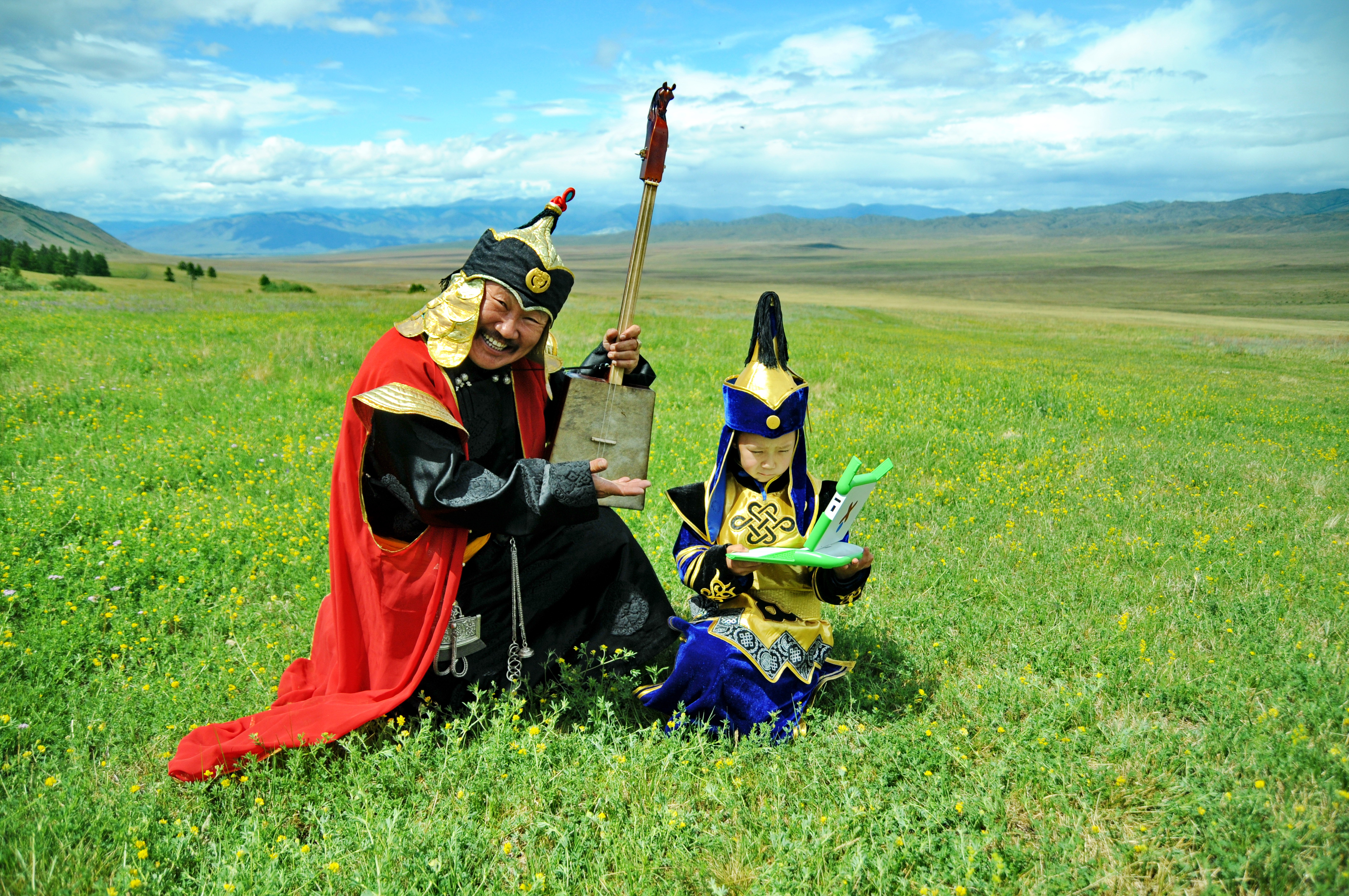
Tuvan throat singer Kongar-ool Ondar

Traditionally, the Tuvan people are a Central Asian yurt-dwelling nomadic culture, with distinctive traditions in music, cuisine, and folk art. Tuvan music features Tuvan throat singing (khoomei), in which the singer sings a fundamental tone and an overtone simultaneously. This type of singing can be heard during performances by the Tuvan National Orchestra, at events such as the 'International Khoomei Day' held at the National Tuvinian Theatre in Kyzyl.

The Tuvan craft tradition includes carving the soft stone, agalmatolite. A frequent motif is hand-held-sized animals, such as horses.

Important archaeological excavations in Tuva include Arzhaan-1 and Tunnug 1, dating to the ninth century BC. and Arzhaan-2, where Scythian animal art in great variety, and over 9,000 decorative gold pieces were unearthed. A collection of gold jewelry from this site is on display at the National Museum Aldan-Maadyr in Kyzyl.

Festivals celebrating Tuvan traditions include the ecological film festival "The Living Path of Dersu", the Interregional Festival of National Cultures "Heart of Asia". It has become a tradition to hold the international festival of live music "Ustuu-Khuree", the International Symposium "Khoomei – the Phenomenon of the Culture of the Peoples of Central Asia", the Regional Competition-Festival of Performers on National Instruments "Dingildai", the International Felt Festival "Patterns of Life on Felt" Pop songs "Melodies of the Sayan Mountains".

=== Religion ===
Tuva is one of the few places in the world where the original form of shamanism is preserved as part of the traditional culture of Tuva. Shamanism presupposes the existence of good and evil spirits inhabiting mountains, forests and water, as well as the heavens and the underworld. The mediator between man and the spirits is the shaman. It is believed that with the help of spirits the shaman is able to cure patients and predict the future.

In Tuva, shamanism peacefully coexists with Buddhism. Buddhism is associated with many folk rituals, calendar holidays, and folk medicines in Tuva. Centers of Buddhism in Tuva are Khuree – temples, temple complexes; the temple complex Tsechenling in Kyzyl is the residence of Khambo Lama, head of Buddhism in Tuva. Treasures of the old Slavonic culture in the Asian Tuva saved along with the values of other peoples – children's folklore ensemble "Oktay" from the city of Kyzyl in the course several ethnographic expeditions in the old believers ' settlements were able to collect an extensive collection of samples of ancient singing art.

== Sports ==
Bandy, a sport similar to ice hockey, is played in Tuva. Mongolian-style wrestling is very popular, as are most martial arts. Horse riding related sports are also predominant in the area.

== Miscellaneous ==
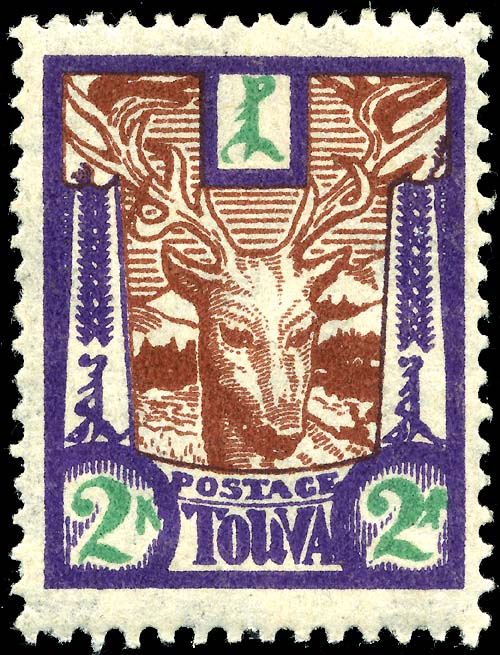
Tuvan stamp from 1927

- In the 1920s and 1930s, postage stamps from Tuva were issued. Many philatelists have been fascinated with Tuva because of these stamps. The stamps were issued mainly during the brief period of Tuvan independence and were not accepted by serious collectors until recently as they were thought to be produced in Moscow and not to represent a genuine postal service.
- According to Ilya Zakharov of Moscow's Vavilov Institute of General Genetics, genetic evidence suggests that the modern Tuvan people are the closest genetic relatives to the native peoples of North and South America.
- Physicist Richard Feynman details in his autobiographical works that he became fascinated with Tuva as a child and was able to make limited contact with the country despite the constraints of the Soviet period. His unsuccessful attempts to visit were detailed in Ralph Leighton's book Tuva or Bust!

== Notable people ==
- Sainkho Namtchylak (born 1957), throat and experimental singer
- Kongar-ool Ondar (1962–2013), throat singer and a member of the Great Khural of Tuva.
- Stepan Saryg-Ool (1908–1983), Soviet Tuvan poet, writer, folklore specialist, and politician.
- Sergei Shoigu (born 1955), former Minister of Emergency Situations, former Minister of Defence of the Russian Federation and current Secretary of the Security Council of Russia.
- Rōga Tokiyoshi (born 1999, name Amartuvshin Amarsanaa), a professional sumo wrestler, wrestling for the Futagoyama stable. He is the only wrestler from Russia currently competing in professional sumo.

== See also ==
- Altai-Sayan region
- List of historical unrecognized states and dependencies
- Tuva horse
