= Deaths in May 1980 =

The following is a list of notable deaths in May 1980.

Entries for each day are listed alphabetically by surname. A typical entry lists information in the following sequence:

- Name, age, country of citizenship at birth, subsequent country of citizenship (if applicable), reason for notability, cause of death (if known), and reference.

== May 1980 ==
=== 1 ===
- Henry Levin, 70, American film director (Journey to the Center of the Earth), heart attack.
- Dave MacKay, 61, Canadian ice hockey player, respiratory failure.
- Gene Markey, 84, American screenwriter and naval admiral.
- Fred Ormskerk, 57, Surinamese soldier, torture murder.
- Ōuchi Hyōei, 91, Japanese economist and academic administrator.
- Johann Pscheidt, 90, Austrian building contractor and humanitarian.
- Shoba, 17, Indian actress, suicide by hanging.
- Sir Bruce Small, 84, Australian politician and businessman, cancer.
- George Tully, 76, American football player.
- George Woodend, 62, American baseball player.

=== 2 ===
- Théophile Alajouanine, 89, French neurologist.
- John Brewer, 74, American football player.
- Ben Mark Cherrington, 94, American academic administrator.
- John Henry Cook, 77, Canadian politician.
- Alioune Diop, 70, Senegalese writer and editor.
- Clarrie Grimmett, 88, New Zealand-born Australian cricketer.
- Mihkel Lepper, 80, Estonian actor.
- Sir Jocelyn Lucas, 90, British politician, MP (1939–1966).
- André-Marie Mbida, 65, Cameroonian politician.
- Cecile O'Rahilly, 85, Irish linguist.
- George Pal, 72, Hungarian-American animator (Puppetoons) and film director, heart attack.
- Alfred Lionel Rose, 82, Australian politician, veterinarian and soldier.
- Ragnvald Thunestvedt, 54, Danish Olympic racewalker (1952).
- Herbert Westmacott, 28, British soldier, shot.
- Julie Winterová-Mezerová, 87, Czech painter.

=== 3 ===
- Ted D. Clark, 59, American politician, member of the Iowa House of Representatives (1949–1953) and Senate (1953–1957).
- George P. Elliott, 61, American poet, novelist and essayist, heart attack.
- Mark Gosling, 93, English-Australian painter and politician.
- Wayne B. Hales, 86, American physicist and academic administrator.
- Fatah Jasin, 64, Indonesian politician.

=== 4 ===
- Emanuele Basile, 30, Italian police officer, shot.
- Siegfried Böhm, 51, East German politician, shot.
- Jaime Duque, 48, Colombian Olympic fencer (1960).
- Franz Götz, 67, German flying ace.
- Kay Hammond, 71, English actress.
- Joe "Mr Piano" Henderson, 60, Scottish pianist and composer, heart attack.
- Fernando Hurtado Echenique, 77, Chilean politician.
- Anant Kanekar, 74, Indian writer.
- Bert Rogers, 63, Australian footballer.
- Josip Broz Tito, 87, Yugoslav politician, prime minister (1943–1963) and president (since 1953).
- Tadeusz Waśko, 57, Polish footballer.
- Reginald Westwood, 72, New Zealand cricketer.

=== 5 ===
- Henri Grenier, 80, Canadian Roman Catholic priest and theologian.
- Arvo Haanpää, 81, Finnish Olympic equestrian (1948).
- Aage Marius Hansen, 89, Danish Olympic gymnast (1912).
- Sir Archibald James, 86, British politician, MP (1931–1945).
- Kanhaiya Lal Kapoor, 69, Indian satirist and writer, cardiac arrest.
- Leonard Woods Labaree, 82, American historian and documentary editor.
- Betty May, 85, British singer, dancer and model, heart attack.
- Isabel Briggs Myers, 82, American writer and pseudoscientist (Myers–Briggs Type Indicator).
- Carl Pfeufer, 69, American comic book artist.
- Harry Ramoutar, 35, Trinidadian cricketer.
- Frank Scully, 80, Australian footballer.
- Homer Stryker, 85, American orthopedic surgeon and businessman (Stryker Corporation).
- Les Wade, 71, Canadian Olympic runner (1932).
- Stewart Way, 69, American basketball coach.

=== 6 ===
- María Luisa Bombal, 69, Chilean novelist (The Shrouded Woman), gastrointestinal bleeding.
- Lola Cornero, 88, Dutch actress.
- Anne Dalgarno, 70, English-born Australian politician and community leader.
- Alan Dower, 82, British politician, MP (1931–1950).
- Andrew Durant, 25, Australian musician and songwriter, cancer.
- Herb Hollyman, 40, American football coach.
- Glenn Holtzman, 49, American football player, heart attack.
- Adele Kern, 78, German opera singer.
- Frank Kirkleski, 75, American football player and coach.
- Arthur Levitt Sr., 79, American lawyer and politician, heart attack.
- Henning Müller, 83, Swedish tennis player.
- Ayinla Omowura, 47, Nigerian musician, bludgeoned.
- Frank H. Ono, 56, American soldier, Medal of Honor recipient.
- Bryn Phillips, 79, Welsh rugby player.
- Arnold Sorsby, 79, Polish-British ophthalmologist.
- Hank Sweeney, 64, American baseball player.
- William Warbey, 76, British politician, MP (1945–1950, 1953–1966).

=== 7 ===
- Sigval Bergesen the Younger, 87, Norwegian shipping magnate.
- Federico Cafiero, 65, Italian mathematician.
- Dame Margaret Cole, 87, English writer, poet and politician.
- Neil Farren, 87, Irish Roman Catholic prelate and educator.
- Johnny Hunter, 54, Australian rugby player.
- Aoua Kéita, 67, Malian writer and politician.
- Steve Maronic, 62, American football player.
- William Parrington, 90, English cricketer.
- Risto Solanko, 78, Finnish diplomat.
- Claude Treglown, 87, English cricketer.

=== 8 ===
- Sir Geoffrey Baker, 67, British army marshal.
- Ricardo Calo, 61, Spanish footballer.
- Jimmy Connor, 70, Scottish footballer.
- Sam Coon, 77, American politician, member of the U.S. House of Representatives (1953–1957).
- Luigi Fenaroli, 80, Italian botanist.
- John L. Head, 64, American basketball coach.
- Chieko Higashiyama, 89, Japanese actress.
- Charles Edward Hubbard, 79, British botanist.
- Yitzhak Kanev, 83–84, Russian-Israeli politician, MK (1950–1951).
- Henry Laurence Lindo, 68, Jamaican civil servant.
- Pierre Marchand, 31, French Olympic fencer (1972).
- Norman Mingo, 84, American commercial artist and illustrator (Mad).
- Farrokhroo Parsa, 58, Iranian politician, execution by firing squad.
- Perdigão Queiroga, 63, Portuguese filmmaker, traffic collision.
- Oswold Stephens, 83, New Zealand potter and chemist.
- Mayilai Seeni. Venkatasami, 79, Indian historian and writer.
- Fred Wigington, 82, American baseball player.

=== 9 ===
- Fernand Chevalier, 81, French politician.
- Rolf Hansen, 73, Norwegian Olympic runner (1936).
- Prince Himalaya of Nepal, 58, Nepali royal.
- Øivind Lorentzen, 97, Norwegian shipping magnate.
- James Alexander George Smith McCartney, 34, Turks and Caicos politician, plane crash.
- Kate Molale, 52, South African political activist, traffic collision.
- Pearl Farmer Richardson, 88, American peace activist.
- James Webb, 34, Scottish historian, suicide.

=== 10 ===
- Hans Bohn, 88, German typographer.
- Henri Crémieux, 83, French actor.
- Emiel Faignaert, 61, Belgian racing cyclist.
- Jack Flaherty, 71, British Olympic gymnast (1948).
- William Albert Flick, 90, Australian bacteriologist.
- Adele Ginzberg, 93, German-American writer and Jewish activist.
- Yoshie Katsurada, 68, Japanese mathematician.
- Kálmán Konrád, 83, Hungarian footballer.
- Frank Lynch, 71, British trade unionist and politician.
- Reba Monness, 69, American table tennis player.
- Leslie Peltier, 80, American astronomer.
- Jan Pivec, 72, Czech actor.
- Nadas Rastenis, 89, Lithuanian-American poet and translator.
- Sir Victor Seely, 79, British hereditary peer.

=== 11 ===
- John Beecher, 76, American poet and journalist, lung disease.
- Howard Mumford Jones, 88, American historian and literary critic.
- Kaarlo Mäkinen, 87, Finnish Olympic wrestler (1920, 1924, 1928).
- Zareh Mutafian, 73, Armenian-French painter.
- Przemysław Ogrodziński, 62, Polish diplomat.
- Henry Knox Sherrill, 89, American Episcopal prelate.
- Daniel John Snyder Jr., 64, American jurist, heart attack.
- Fernando Soto, 69, Mexican actor and comedian.
- Jesse Addison Udall, 86, American jurist and politician, member of the Arizona House of Representatives (1931–1938).
- Dyre Vaa, 77, Norwegian sculptor and painter.
- Gheza Vida, 67, Hungarian-Romanian sculptor.

=== 12 ===
- Ulbo de Sitter, 78, Dutch geologist.
- Bette Nesmith Graham, 56, American businesswoman (Liquid Paper) and philanthropist, complications from a stroke.
- Päiviö Hetemäki, 66, Finnish politician, MP (1945–1962).
- Sheikh Mukhtar, 65, Indian-Pakistani actor.
- William A. Robson, 84, British academic and public administration scholar.
- Lillian Roth, 69, American actress and singer.
- Miki Sawada, 78, Japanese social worker.
- Tadahiko Shimazu, 80, Japanese politician.

=== 13 ===
- Elliott Arnold, 67, American author, journalist and screenwriter.
- Marc Büchler, 50–51, Swiss Olympic equestrian (1956).
- Maruxa Fandiño Ricart, 82, Spanish anarchist activist.
- Fumio Gotō, 96, Japanese politician, acting prime minister (1936).
- Gerard Leembruggen, 83, Dutch tennis player.
- Francisco Otayza, 65, Peruvian Olympic sports shooter (1956).
- Freeman Tilden, 96, American writer.
- Otto Umbehr, 78, German photojournalist.

=== 14 ===
- Elma Bulla, 66, Hungarian actress.
- Dick Cassiano, 62, American football player.
- Carl Ebert, 93, German actor and stage director.
- Fatmawati, 57, Indonesian socialite, first lady (1945–1967), heart attack.
- Hugh Griffith, 67, Welsh actor (Ben-Hur, Tom Jones, Oliver!).
- Hilda Jerea, 64, Romanian pianist and composer.
- Christine Longford, 79, British playwright.
- Hans Rösch, 65, West German Olympic bobsledder (1956).
- Sir Norman Rydge, 79, Australian businessman.
- Sigrid Schultz, 87, American journalist and war correspondent.
- Subrantas Siswanto, 57, Indonesian politician, liver cancer.
- Wilhelm Weismann, 79, German composer and musicologist.

=== 15 ===
- Len Allum, 72, English footballer.
- Alfred Aslett, 79, English rugby player.
- Lela Bliss, 84, American actress.
- Andrea Borgnis, 50, Italian Olympic weightlifter (1960).
- John Somers Dines, 94, English meteorologist.
- Wilhelmus Doll, 79, Dutch Olympic wrestler (1924).
- Jóhann Hafstein, 64, Icelandic politician, prime minister (1970–1971).
- Donald D. Lorenzen, 60, American politician.
- Len Lye, 78, New Zealand sculptor and experimental filmmaker, leukemia.
- Milton Parsons, 75, American actor.
- Gordon Prange, 69, American historian and writer, cancer.
- Marion Frederic Ramírez de Arellano, 66, American submarine commander.
- Gordon E. Sawyer, 74, American sound director (West Side Story).
- Umberto Scarpelli, 75, Italian filmmaker.
- Ian Scott, 65, British Olympic racing cyclist (1948).

=== 16 ===
- Izis Bidermanas, 69, Lithuanian-French photographer.
- José Calvo, 64, Spanish actor.
- Hermann Flade, 47, German political scientist.
- Alexander Gray, 83, British RAF marshal.
- Roger Kent, 73, American politician.
- Fredrik Lange-Nielsen, 89, Norwegian mathematician and insurance executive.
- Alfred Lif, 72, Swedish skier.
- Kent Mackenzie, 50, English-American filmmaker (The Exiles).
- Cap Peterson, 37, American baseball player, kidney disease.
- Marin Preda, 57, Romanian novelist and publisher, alcohol poisoning.
- Joël Scherk, 33, French theoretical physicist, complications from diabetes.
- Robert Allan Smith, 71, British mathematician and physicist.
- Hazel M. Walker, 91, American jurist.
- Cornett Wood, 74, American animator.

=== 17 ===
- Suzanne Amblard, 83, French tennis player.
- Elmer Belt, 87, American urologist.
- Leo A. Berg, 72, American politician.
- Ernst Blum, 76, German footballer.
- Erling Brene, 83, Danish composer.
- Roger Close-Brooks, 73, English rower.
- Harold Connolly, 78, Canadian politician and journalist.
- Amos du Plooy, 58, South African rugby player.
- Tom Dwan, 90, Irish hurler.
- Harald Juell, 86, Norwegian diplomat.
- Gündüz Kılıç, 61, Turkish football player and manager.
- Olga Lakela, 90, Finnish-American botanist.
- Lippy Lipshitz, 77, Russian-born South African artist.
- George Mahaffy, 56, American stock car racing driver.
- Myrtle McGrain, 96, American actress and model.
- Thore Michelsen, 92, Norwegian Olympic rower (1920).
- Oala Oala-Rarua, 45, Papua New Guinean politician and diplomat, stroke.
- C. C. Roberts, 79, British businessman.
- Duncan Thompson, 85, Australian rugby player, coach and executive.
- Byron F. Wackett, 68, American politician, member of the Wisconsin State Assembly (1953–1976).
- Ernst Wiemann, 60, German opera singer.

=== 18 ===
- Semyon Chuykov, 77, Soviet artist.
- Ian Curtis, 23, English musician (Joy Division), suicide by hanging.
- Robert J. Dunne, 80, American football player and coach and jurist.
- Roman Jańczyk, 77, Polish footballer.
- Walter Kohut, 52, Austrian actor.
- Vahdah Olcott-Bickford, 94, American guitarist and astrologer.
- Bert Papworth, 81, British trade unionist.
- Antonín Svoboda, 72, Czech computer scientist.
- Notable victims of the 1980 eruption of Mount St. Helens:
  - Reid Blackburn, 27, American photojournalist.
  - David A. Johnston, 30, American volcanologist.
  - Robert Landsburg, 48, American photographer.
  - Harry R. Truman, 83, American businessman.

=== 19 ===
- Richard Bott, 79, English Olympic skeleton racer (1948).
- Ros Bower, 57, Australian writer and television producer, cancer.
- Ragnar Gustavsson, 72, Swedish footballer.
- Mario Héber Usher, 58–59, Uruguayan politician and diplomat.
- Janet Hitchman, 63, British writer.
- Hiroya Ino, 88, Japanese politician.
- Sir Christopher Peto, 83, British soldier and politician, MP (1945–1955).
- Tapishwar Narain Raina, 59, Indian general and diplomat.
- Ray Rennahan, 84, American cinematographer.
- Joseph Schull, 74, Canadian playwright, screenwriter and historian, leukemia.
- Fay Stender, 48, American lawyer, suicide.

=== 20 ===
- Alf Bauman, 60, American football player, heart failure.
- James W. Huffman, 85, American politician and lawyer, member of the U.S. Senate (1945–1946).
- Gaus Khan, 71, Bangladeshi politician.
- Valentine Lentz, 82, American basketball coach.
- Ethel Maynard, 74, American politician, activist and nurse, member of the Arizona House of Representatives (1967–1973), heart failure.
- Sir Oscar Morland, 76, British diplomat.
- Zinaida Tusnolobova-Marchenko, 59, Soviet medic, pneumonia.
- Hannes Volotinen, 68, Finnish politician.
- Jack Walsh, 67, Australian cricketer.
- Reginald Woodman, 74, English cricketer.
- Sir Vincent Ziani de Ferranti, 87, English businessman (Ferranti).

=== 21 ===
- Frank Croucher, 65, American baseball player.
- George Grebenstein, 95, American basketball player.
- Sir Cornelius Greenfield, 74, Rhodesian civil servant.
- Árpád Henney, 84, Hungarian politician.
- Hiroshi Inagaki, 74, Japanese filmmaker (Samurai I: Musashi Miyamoto), liver disease.
- Ida Kamińska, 80, Polish actress and playwright, cardiovascular disease.
- Glenn Roberts, 67, American basketball player.
- Charles Sergel, 69, Brazilian-born British physician and Olympic rower (1932).
- Arnim O. Sundet, 76, American politician and businessman.
- Pearl Swanson, 84, American nutritionist.
- Arthur Tofte, 77, American science fiction author, cancer.
- Roberto Wachholtz, 80, Chilean politician.
- Paul Zimmermann, 84, German Nazi official.

=== 22 ===
- Bengala, 73, Brazilian football player and manager.
- Luke Cuni, 68, Albanian-Australian community leader, shot.
- Reginald Foort, 87, English organist.
- Len Janiak, 64, American football player.
- Louise Elisabeth de Meuron, 97, Swiss aristocrat.
- T. B. Tennekoon, 68, Sri Lankan politician, MP (1956–1977).
- Mahavir Tyagi, 80, Indian politician.

=== 23 ===
- Jens Enevoldsen, 72, Danish chess player.
- Terry Furlow, 25, American basketball player, traffic collision.
- Munir Sarhadi, 48–49, Pakistani musician.
- Frank Sundstrom, 79, American politician, member of the U.S. House of Representatives (1943–1949).

=== 24 ===
- Ronald Burroughs, 62, British diplomat.
- Wilfred Clouston, 64, New Zealand flying ace, complications from a fall.
- Margaret B. Freeman, 80, American art historian and curator.
- Jorge González Camarena, 72, Mexican artist, stroke.
- Kim Jae-gyu, 56, South Korean general and politician, assassin of Park Chung Hee, execution by hanging.
- Ada Perkins, 20, Puerto Rican model, traffic collision.
- Raymond Francis Robbins, 68, American painter.
- Loftus Dudley Ward, 74, Canadian politician.

=== 25 ===
- Jesse Brown, 65, American baseball player.
- Alan Chadwick, 70, English gardener and agriculturalist.
- Paco Goyoaga, 60, Spanish Olympic equestrian (1956, 1960, 1964).
- Herbert Nachbar, 50, German novelist and playwright.
- Klaus Samelson, 61, German mathematician and computer scientist.
- Marquardt Slevogt, 71, German Olympic ice hockey player (1928, 1932).
- George West, 86, British Anglican prelate and missionary.

=== 26 ===
- Franz Bachelin, 84, German art director.
- Norah Balls, 93, British suffragette and magistrate.
- Adolfo Costa du Rels, 88, Bolivian diplomat and writer.
- Haldane Douglas, 86, American art director.
- Haig P. Manoogian, 64, American film professor and producer (Who's That Knocking at My Door).
- Ron McLean, 66, New Zealand environmentalist.
- Niels J. Mürer, 81, Norwegian journalist and writer.
- Emil Ochyra, 43, Polish Olympic fencer (1960, 1964).
- Sir Geoffrey Oliver, 82, British naval admiral.
- Ted Shapiro, 80, American pianist and songwriter.
- Charlotte Wilder, 81, American poet.

=== 27 ===
- Halfdan Olaus Christophersen, 77, Norwegian historian.
- Austin E. Cofrin, 96, American industrialist.
- Ted DeVita, 17, American aplastic anemic boy, inspiration for The Boy in the Plastic Bubble, transfusion hemosiderosis.
- Sadao Iguchi, 80, Japanese diplomat, pneumonia.
- Harold Masters, 84, New Zealand rugby player.
- John O'Brien, 71, Australian general.
- Gün Sazak, 48, Turkish politician, shot.
- Earl Sprackling, 89, American football player.
- Kintaro Usuda, 73, Japanese Olympic boxer (1928).
- Yoon Sang-won, 29, South Korean political activist, shot.

=== 28 ===
- Albert Brough, 84, English rugby player and footballer.
- Jack Greenhalgh, 71–72, British trade unionist.
- Henriette H. Lannes, 80, French educator.
- Rolf Nevanlinna, 84, Finnish mathematician.
- Lowell Fitz Randolph, 85, American botanist and geneticist.
- Miroslav Šašek, 63, Czech writer and illustrator.
- Frederic H. Smith Jr., 71, American general.
- Walter Tobagi, 33, Italian journalist, shot.
- Mirabel Topham, 88, British businesswoman, cancer.

=== 29 ===
- Albert Beckaert, 69, Belgian racing cyclist.
- Maximiano de Sousa, 62, Portuguese singer.
- Harvey L. Dueholm, 70, American politician, member of the Wisconsin State Assembly (1959–1979), cancer.
- Martin B. Lohmann, 98, American politician, member of the Illinois House of Representatives (1922–1932) and Senate (1932–1952).
- Robert Paterson, 63, English cricketer.
- Les Roberts, 79, English footballer.

=== 30 ===
- Otome Amatsu, 74, Japanese actress and entertainer.
- Alexei Khomich, 60, Soviet footballer.
- Charles Holland Locke, 92, Canadian jurist.
- Carl Radle, 37, American bassist (Derek and the Dominos, Gary Lewis & the Playboys), kidney failure.
- Walter Silz, 85, American linguist and literary scholar.
- Matei Socor, 71, Romanian composer and communist activist.

=== 31 ===
- Sonny Burke, 66, American composer and bandleader, cancer.
- Patrick Graham, 65, British naval admiral.
- Charlie Meyer, 83, South African rugby player.
- Juliusz Miller, 84, Polish footballer.
- Petrus Kanisius Ojong, 59, Indonesian journalist and businessman.
- Richard Trauner, 79, Austrian dentist and oral surgeon.
