= Mylapore (disambiguation) =

Mylapore (also Mayilai or Thirumayilai) is a neighborhood in the central part of the city of Chennai, Tamil Nadu, India.

Mylapore may also refer to these related to the Chennai neighborhood:

- Mylapore (Corporation zone), zone of the Greater Chennai Corporation
- Mylapore (state assembly constituency), electoral constituency of Tamil Nadu
- Mylapore taluk, a subdistrict of Chennai
- Mylapore clique, a political faction in the Madras Presidency of British India
- Thirumayilai metro station
- Thirumayilai railway station
- Mylapore Thiruvalluvar Temple, a Hindu temple
- Mayilai Seeni. Venkatasami, Indian scholar
