= McGrain =

McGrain is a surname. Notable people with the surname include:

- Danny McGrain (born 1950), Scottish international footballer
- Danny McGrain (footballer, born 1953) (1953–2004), Scottish footballer
- Myrtle McGrain (1883–1980), American actress
- Tommy McGrain (born 1959), Scottish footballer

== See also ==
- McGrain v. Daugherty, a United States Supreme Court case
- Kintner-McGrain House, a historic building in Corydon, Indiana
