= Pierre Marchand (disambiguation) =

Pierre Marchand may refer to:

- Pierre Marchand (born 1958), Canadian songwriter
- Pierre Marchand (fencer) (born 1948), French fencer
- Pierre Marchand (editor) (1939–2002), French publisher
