= Berta Ochsner =

American dancer

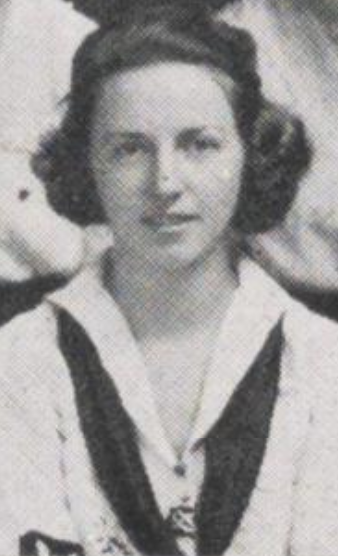
- Berta Ochsner, from the 1920 yearbook of the University of Wisconsin
- Born: Bertha Ochsner; July 26, 1896; Chicago, Illinois, U.S.
- Died: September 7, 1942 (age 46); New York, New York, U.S.
- Other name: Berta Campbell
- Occupations: Dancer, dance educator, choreographer, composer, poet
- Mother: Marion Mitchell Ochsner

Berta Ochsner (July 26, 1896 – September 7, 1942), originally Bertha Ochsner, was an American dancer, dance educator, and choreographer in the 1930s and 1940s, based in Chicago. She also composed music and wrote plays and poetry.

== Early life and education ==
Ochsner was born in Chicago, the daughter of Albert J. Ochsner and Marion Mitchell Ochsner. Her father was a prominent surgeon, and her mother was president of the National Federation of Music Clubs. She graduated from Francis Parker High School in 1915, and from the University of Wisconsin–Madison in 1919, with a degree in physical education. While at Wisconsin, she wrote and starred in a one-act a play, What Sunken Meadow Saw (1917). She studied modern dance in Germany, and in New York City.

== Career ==
Ochsner was based in Chicago and often performed there. In 1930 she attended an international dance congress in Munich, where she observed the work of Mary Wigman. She worked with Marian Van Tuyl in Chicago. She made her New York debut in 1935, with a solo recital at the Guild Theatre. "Miss Ochsner is unquestionably a gifted dancer," noted John Martin after that performance. "Her body is an excellent instrument and she moves with real beauty and authority." Ochsner worked with Katherine Dunham and Grace and Kurt Graff as a director and choreographer of the Ballet Fedre, a dance troupe funded by the Federal Theatre Project.

Ochsner returned to Madison to perform, and to teach dance in her teacher Margaret H'Doubler's program there. She also studied and taught in Sweden, and at the Bennington Summer School for Dance in the 1930s. She resisted labels and drew from eclectic influences. "She is an exponent of no one particular school of dance," explained a student reporter in 1931. "By means of her collective experience, she effects the liberation of new forms, not through imitation, but through the release of individual energies."

Ochsner's 1915 poem "The Nights o' Spring" was adapted for a madrigal by composer Frances McCollin. Composer Amy Beach set a poem by Ochsner to music as "A Mirage" (1924). Ochsner was a sponsor of the League of Women Shoppers of Chicago.

== Works ==
"I choose to dance now because arms and legs grow old," she explained of her dormant literary interests in 1934. "When I am older I shall perhaps write, and express my emotion in that way. Some day I'm going to write a good play."

- "The Nights o' Spring" (1915, poem)
- What Sunken Meadow Saw (1917, one-act play)
- "Sing a Song of Sixpence" (1922, musical composition)
- Fantasy 1939 (1939, choreography)

== Personal life ==
Ochsner married Canadian physician Douglas Gordon Campbell in 1928. They had a daughter who died in infancy in 1933. They divorced, and Campbell married Ochsner's colleague Marian Van Tuyl in 1940. Ochsner died by suicide in 1942, at the age of 46, in New York City. Her grave is in a family cemetery in Baraboo, Wisconsin.
