= 2021 Morsø municipal election =

← 2017	16 November 2021	2025 →

All 21 seats to the Morsø Municipal Council 11 seats needed for a majority
- Turnout: 11,889 (73.2%) ▼3.9pp
	First party	Second party	Third party
	V	A	O
Party	Venstre	Social Democrats	Danish People's Party
Last election	12 seats, 48.3%	6 seats, 28.4%	2 seats, 8.7%
Seats won	11	6	1
Seat change	▼1	0	▼1
Popular vote	5,423	3,473	720
Percentage	46.1%	29.5%	6.1%
Swing	▼2.2%	▲1.1%	▼2.6%
	Fourth party	Fifth party	Sixth party
	C	B	M
Party	Conservatives	Social Liberals	Demokratisk Balance
Last election	0 seats, 3.3%	Did not stand	1 seat, 5.8%
Seats won	1	1	1
Seat change	▲1	▲1	0
Popular vote	626	433	380
Percentage	5.3%	3.7%	3.2%
Swing	▲2.0%	New	▼2.6%
Mayor before election
Hans Bertelsen
Venstre
Mayor after election
Hans Bertelsen
Venstre

Since 2014, Hans Bertelsen from Venstre had been mayor of Morsø Municipality. In the last election, Venstre had won an absolute majority of seats.

In this election Hans Bertelsen would stand again. He would win re-election, after it was clear that Venstre would win 11 seats, and hold their absolute majority. The day following election night, a constitution was announced, that would give Hans Bertelsen a third term as mayor.

== Electoral system ==
For elections to Danish municipalities, a number varying from 9 to 31 are chosen to be elected to the municipal council. The seats are then allocated using the D'Hondt method and a closed list proportional representation. Morsø Municipality had 21 seats in 2021

Unlike in Danish General Elections, in elections to municipal councils, electoral alliances are allowed.

== Electoral alliances ==
=== Electoral Alliance 1 ===
Party		Political alignment
B	Social Liberals	Centre to Centre-left
Ø	Red–Green Alliance	Left-wing to Far-Left

=== Electoral Alliance 2 ===
Party		Political alignment
C	Conservatives	Centre-right
M	Demokratisk Balance	Local politics

=== Electoral Alliance 3 ===
Party		Political alignment
O	Danish People's Party	Right-wing to Far-right
V	Venstre	Centre-right

== Results by polling station ==
Polling Station	A	B	C	D	F	O	V	Ø	Others
Polling Station	%	%	%	%	%	%	%	%	%
Sejerslev	22.2	2.5	20.7	5.1	0.6	5.8	39.4	2.7	1.0
Flade	29.7	3.6	8.3	1.1	2.2	5.3	36.1	4.4	9.2
Bjergby	23.3	3.6	9.1	1.6	2.0	4.4	47.4	2.8	5.9
Sundby	25.3	8.4	3.1	1.5	1.5	6.4	49.5	2.3	2.0
Solbjerg	20.1	3.5	5.2	1.8	5.7	9.6	47.6	3.1	3.5
Thorup	18.6	2.3	3.9	1.6	3.1	5.0	56.2	6.6	2.7
Ø. Jølby	22.6	1.7	4.2	0.6	1.5	6.1	54.7	1.9	6.7
Erslev	26.2	1.0	5.1	1.3	2.6	8.5	51.9	0.0	3.3
Tødsø	29.5	1.8	4.8	2.0	4.2	4.8	48.8	1.6	2.6
Frøslev	30.5	1.5	3.4	1.8	1.8	5.2	54.0	1.8	0.0
Tæbring	19.5	8.1	1.4	2.3	1.7	6.4	59.0	0.6	0.9
Fredsø	23.1	3.4	5.1	1.5	1.7	5.9	56.1	1.3	1.9
Vils	18.0	3.0	3.0	0.2	0.6	21.2	51.4	1.5	1.1
Karby	13.9	18.0	2.4	1.4	2.0	5.7	54.3	1.6	0.6
Redsted	22.4	7.5	2.0	0.8	1.7	7.5	54.8	1.1	2.2
Ørding	18.7	4.3	4.3	0.8	1.6	6.5	61.2	1.9	0.5
Ø. Assels	27.3	2.8	2.6	3.1	2.8	13.6	43.8	3.1	0.9
Nykøbing	37.9	2.4	5.3	1.1	2.1	4.2	39.9	3.1	4.1

== Results ==
Party		Votes	%	+/-	Seats	+/-
Morsø Municipality
V	Venstre	5,423	46.09	-2.21	11	-1
A	Social Democrats	3,473	29.51	+1.07	6	0
O	Danish People's Party	720	6.12	-2.61	1	-1
C	Conservatives	626	5.32	+2.04	1	+1
B	Social Liberals	433	3.68	New	1	New
M	Demokratisk Balance	380	3.23	-2.53	1	0
Ø	Red-Green Alliance	297	2.52	-1.58	0	0
F	Green Left	247	2.10	New	0	New
D	New Right	168	1.43	New	0	New
Total		11,767	100	N/A	21	N/A
Invalid votes		41	0.25	+0.05		
Blank votes		81	0.50	-0.20		
Turnout		11,889	73.23	-3.86		
Source: valg.dk
