= Marian van Tuyl =

American dancer, dance educator, writer and choreographer

- Marian van Tuyl in 1939, from her 1987 newspaper obituary.
- Born: Marian Elizabeth Tubbs; October 16, 1907; Wacousta, Michigan
- Died: November 10, 1987 (aged 80); San Francisco
- Other names: Marion van Tuyl, Marian van Tuyl Campbell (after marriage)
- Occupations: Dancer, choreographer, dance educator, writer, filmmaker

Marian van Tuyl (October 16, 1907 – November 10, 1987), born Marian Tubbs, was an American dancer, dance educator, writer, and choreographer.

== Early life and education ==
Marian Elizabeth Tubbs was born in Wacousta, Michigan, the daughter of Charles Samuel Tubbs and Mary Elizabeth McLaughlin Curry Tubbs. Both of her parents attended Oberlin College. Her father, a Congregational minister, died by accidental drowning when she was young. Her mother, who later became a psychology professor at the University of Michigan, remarried in 1914, and Marian Tubbs used her adoptive father Frank Foster van Tuyl's surname thereafter.

Van Tuyl attended the University of Michigan, where she earned a bachelor's degree in education in 1928. While she was an undergraduate at Michigan, she was "chairman of dances" for the Junior Girls' Play Committee, "dancing manager" of the Women's Athletic Association Board, and an active member the Women's Physical Education Club; she was also the model for a mural, "Young American Womanhood", in a women-only lounge area on campus. She studied dance with Martha Graham, Hanya Holm, Doris Humphrey, and Louis Horst.

== Career ==
Van Tuyl taught dance and directed musical productions at the University of Chicago from 1928 to 1938. While in Chicago, she was one of the founders of the Chicago Dance Council.

She taught at Mills College in California from 1938, when previous dance program head Tina Flade left to marry. Under van Tuyl's leadership, the dance program became an independent academic department, instead of being housed in the Physical Education department. "The only thing we share with physical education is the space and the showers, and dancers are too busy to take many showers," she once explained. Like Flade, she often collaborated with composers in the Mills College community, including Darius Milhaud, Henry Cowell, Lou Harrison, and John Cage. From 1935 to 1947, she performed and toured with her group, the Marian van Tuyl Dance Company. She made two "experimentalist dance films", Horror Dream (1947) and Clinic of Stumble (1948); the former involved a score by John Cage.

She was the longtime editor and publisher of Impulse: An Annual of Contemporary Dance, from 1951 to 1970, and from that published An Anthology of Impulse (1969). She also edited Modern Dance Forms in Relation to the Other Modern Arts by Louis Horst, and was an editor of the Dance Research Journal. She served on the California Arts Commission, and was a founding member of the Congress on Research in Dance. She was a fellow of the Bennington Dance Festival.

== Personal life ==
Marian Van Tuyl married Douglas Gordon Campbell, a psychiatrist, in 1940. He was previously married to her colleague Berta Ochsner. They had three children, Bruce, Robert, and Gail. She was widowed in 1983, and she died from cancer in 1987, in San Francisco, aged 80 years. John Cage contributed a composition to her memorial service. Her papers are in the special collections library at Mills College. There is a recorded 1977 oral history interview with her in the Jerome Robbins Dance Division of the New York Public Library.
