= Sophia Wellbeloved =

Irish artist

Sophia Wellbeloved (born in Dublin, Ireland) is a historian of Western Esotericism, with special reference to 1920s and 1930s Paris, focusing on the life and writings of G. I. Gurdjieff (1866? – 1949).

== Education ==
She received her education at Newtown Quaker School, Ireland, 1951-55; Beechlawn Tutorial College, Oxford, 1955-56; Ruskin School of Art, Oxford, 1955-56; Saint Martin's School of Art, London, 1956-60; Central School of Art and Design, London, 1961; King's College, London, Ph.D. 1996–99. She has identified her tutors and influences as Cecil Collins, 1960-61; Henriette Lannes, Maurice Deselle, Henri Tracol, and others in the Gurdjieff Society, London, 1962–75; the Rev. Donald Reeves and the Anglican community at St. James Church, Piccadilly, 1984-2004.

Awarded a PhD at King's College, London in 1999.

== Work ==
From 1984 to 1991, she worked as a part-time tutor teaching sculpture at Central Saint Martins.

Exhibitions (1980–92): Royal Festival Hall, Bath Festival, Henley Festival, Royal Institute of British Architects; Domenga Gallery, Basle, Switzerland, and at Art Fairs in Basle, London, and Los Angeles.

Wellbeloved was a member of the Gurdjieff Society in London between 1962 and 1975.

Wellbeloved is the author of research papers and books relating to Gurdjieff, these include Gurdjieff, Astrology & Beelzebub’s Tales (Solar Bound, 2002) and Gurdjieff: The Key Concepts (Routledge, 2003). George Adams reviewing Gurdjieff: The Key Concepts suggests that "given the generally unsystematic and occasionally chaotic nature of Gurdjieff's teachings, Wellbeloved's book serves as a very useful introduction to Gurdjieff, offering an orienting structure that is not found in Gurdjieff's published works."

She was the Director of Lighthouse Editions, 2005 – 2012, which published books related to Gurdjieff, and a co-founder in 2006 of the Cambridge Centre for the Study of Esotericism.

== Works ==
- Gurdjieff, Astrology & Beelzeub's Tales, Solar Bound, New Palz, N.Y., 2002
- Gurdjieff: The Key Concepts, Routledge, London and New York, 2003
- 48 Trojan Herrings & Tripidium, Waterloo Press, Hove, 2008
- Praying for Flow, Waterloo Press, Hove, 2011
