= Flade =

Flade is a surname. Notable people with the surname include:

- Hermann Flade (1932–1980), German political scientist
- Klaus-Dietrich Flade (born 1952), German pilot
- Michael Flade (born 1975), German composer
- Tina Flade, German dancer
- Uwe Flade, German music video director and entrepreneur
