= Raymond Robbins =

Raymond Robbins may refer to:

- Raymond Robins (1873–1954), American economist and writer
- Raymond Francis Robbins (1912–1980), American artist
