= Venkatasami =

Venkatasami is a surname. Notable people with the surname include:

- Govinden Venkatasami (fl. from 2024), Mauritian politician
- Mayilai Seeni. Venkatasami (1900–1980), Indian researcher, scholar, historian and writer from Tamil Nadu
