= Katsurada =

Katsurada (Japanese: 桂田) is a Japanese surname. Notable people with this name include:

- Fujiro Katsurada (Japanese: 桂田 富士郎, 1867–1946), Japanese parasitologist
- Katsurada Nagatoshi (Japanese: 桂田 長俊, 1541–1574), feudal Japanese retainer
- Yoshie Katsurada (Japanese: 桂田 芳枝, 1911–1980), Japanese mathematician
