= Frances McCollin =

American composer and musician

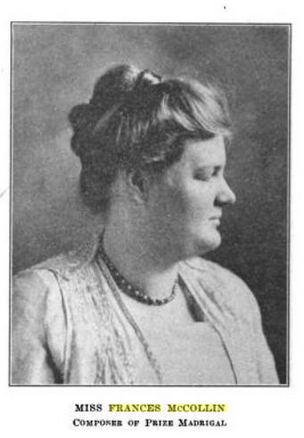
Composer Frances McCollin, from a 1918 publication

Frances McCollin (October 24, 1892 – February 25, 1960) was an American composer and musician, who was blind from early childhood. She was the first woman to win the Clemson Prize from the American Guild of Organists. In 1951, she was named a Distinguished Daughter of Pennsylvania.

== Early life and education ==
Frances McCollin was born in Philadelphia, Pennsylvania in 1892, the daughter of Edward Garrett McCollin and Alice Graham Lanigan McCollin. Her father, a lawyer, had studied musical composition in college, and he wrote and performed music as a side interest throughout his life. He was one of the founders of the Manuscript Music Society of Philadelphia. Her grandfather, George T. Lanigan, was an Irish-Canadian poet and journalist. Her younger sister, Katherine Williams McCollin Arnett, known as "Kitty", was a singer and composer and the mother of Edward Arnett.

When Frances McCollin was five years old, she became blind, probably from congenital glaucoma. Her parents and extended family took an energetic approach to her education at home, focused on music. When she started to compose in girlhood, her father was her first teacher and transcriber. As a child, she described sensations consistent with synaesthesia and perfect pitch. As a young woman she studied with fellow blind musician David Duffield Wood, the organist at St. Stephen's Church in Philadelphia, and with William Wallace Gilchrist and H. Alexander Matthews at the Pennsylvania Institute for Instruction of the Blind.

== Career ==
In her lifetime, McCollin's works were performed frequently by professional and amateur vocal ensembles, and by orchestras including the Philadelphia Orchestra, the Warsaw Philharmonic, the Vancouver Symphony, and others. She met Marian Anderson, Igor Stravinsky, Amy Beach, and other musicians and composers, usually in connection with her mother's work with the Philadelphia Orchestra. Fabien Sevitzky, Eugene Ormandy, and Leopold Stokowski took particular interest in her compositions. McCollin defended Stokowski programming The Internationale for a Philadelphia youth concert in 1934.

Among the honors McCollin won a first prize from the Manuscript Music Society of Philadelphia in 1916, and the Philadelphia Matinee Musical Club's annual prize in 1918. Also in 1918, she became the first woman to win the Clemson Prize from the American Guild of Organists, and the Kimball Company Prize from the Chicago Madrigal Club. In 1931 her composition "Spring in Heaven" won the Federation Prize from the National Federation of Music Clubs. In 1951, she was named a Distinguished Daughter of Pennsylvania.

She gave popular weekly lectures about the Philadelphia Orchestra programs, in which she focused on explaining modern compositions. She also hosted a weekly radio show for children, the "Aunt Frances Music Hour." She conducted a girls' choir at the School for the Blind in West Philadelphia, and the Girls' Glee Club at Swarthmore College for one year (1923-1924). In 1943, the Philadelphia Orchestra's "Request Program" featured works voted into the program by the public; Frances McCollin's "Pavane" was included as a top vote-getter, the only winning composition by a woman.

== Personal life ==
McCollin did earn some money from teaching, lecturing, and publishing royalties, but not enough to be financially independent. She never matured socially and intellectually; she was profoundly dependent on her family both financially and professionally. Throughout her life, she benefitted from transcription help from her family and from other local musicians including Vincent Persichetti, Jeanne Behrend, and Fabien Sevitzky (who would go on to program her works when he conducted the Indianapolis Symphony).

McCollin was in poor health in her last years, and lived with her sister Kitty (who had married a doctor, John Hancock Arnett). When she died in 1960, aged 67 years, members of the Philadelphia Orchestra played a string quartet she composed at her memorial service.

Her scores and other papers are archived at the Free Library of Philadelphia. Another collection of her papers is at the University of Pennsylvania.

== Selected works ==
Among her compositions include:

- Now All the Woods Are Sleeping
- All Glory, Laud and Honor
- Christmas Fantasia, for organ
- Sleep, Holy Babe, for solo voice and string orchestra
- Come Hither, Ye Faithful, for choir
- God's Miracle of May, trio for women's voices
- Pavane
- Spring in Heaven (1931)
- How Firm a Foundation, a chorale cantata based on the tune St. Denio (1943)
- Going Up to London, cantata for women's voices, flute obbligato, and piano accompaniment, text by Nancy Byrd Turner.
- Festival Chorus (Ring Out Wild Bells)
- O Robin, Little Robin, for SSA chorus and piano
- O Sing Unto The Lord, an anthem for mixed voices with organ, first prize winner in 1916 by the Manuscript Music Society of Philadelphia
- Snow Flakes, for high school glee club, arrangement also exists for SSA and piano
- The Lord is King, anthem for organ, winner of American Guild of Organists' 1918 Clemson prize.
- The Nights O'Spring, madrigal for mixed voices. Setting of poem by Berta Ochsner. Winner of the 1918 W. W. Kimball Company prize of the Chicago Madrigal Club.
- The Singing Leaves, setting of James Russell Lowell poem for women's chorus, soloists, and piano, 1918 prize winner from the Philadelphia Matinee Musical Club.
- Sonata for 2 violins and piano
