= David Duffield Wood =

David Duffle Wood
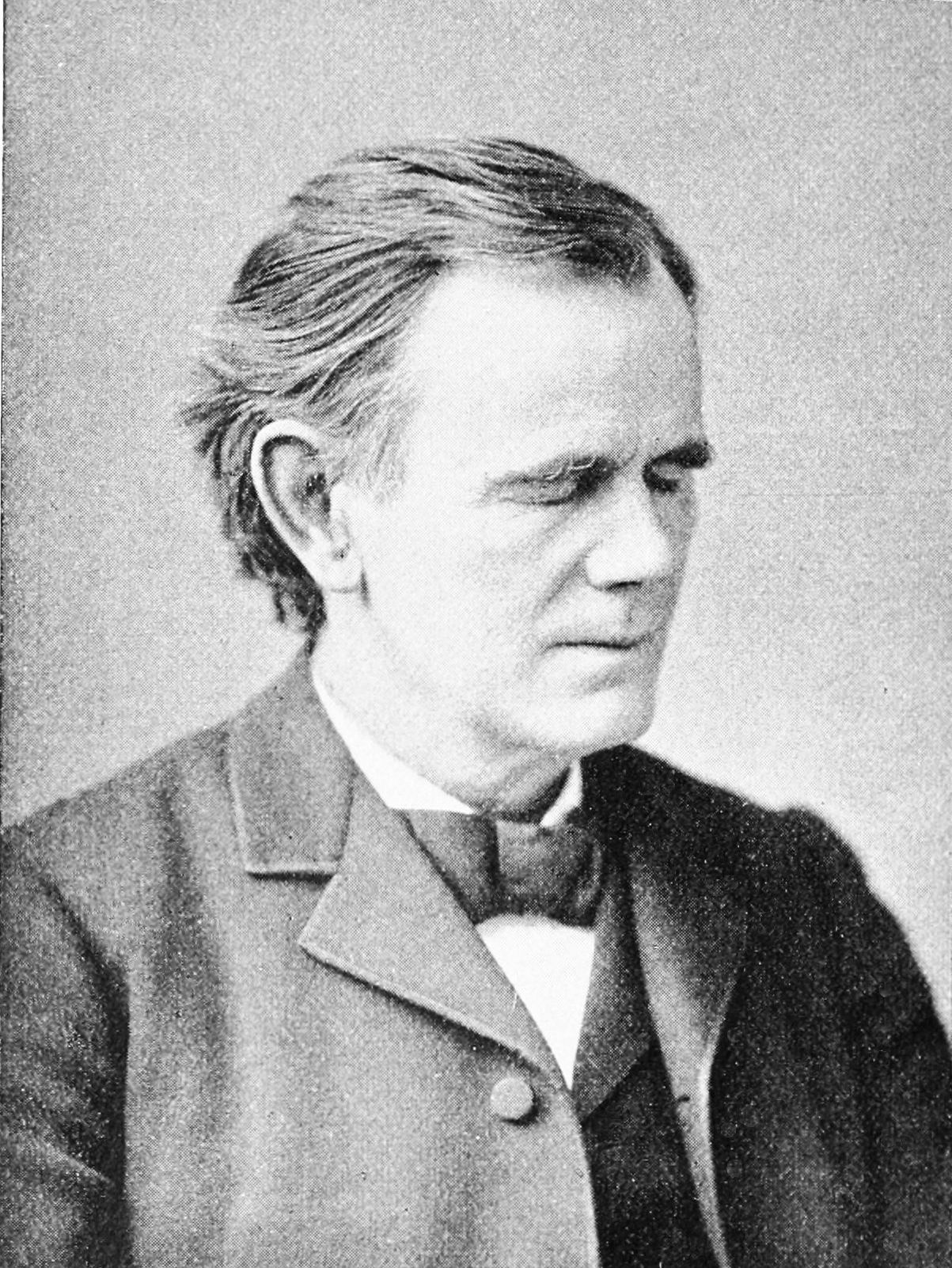

Background information
- Born: March 3, 1838
- Died: March 25, 1910 (aged 72)
- Occupations: Composer
- Instruments: Organ

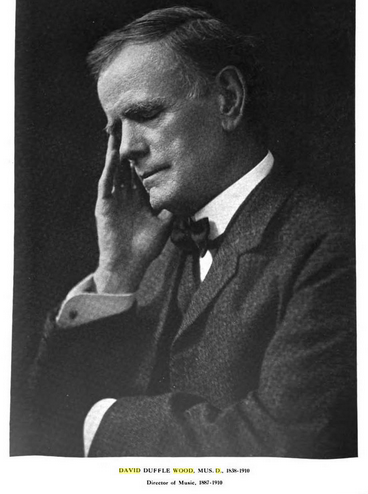
David D. Wood (1838-1910), Philadelphia organist

David Duffle Wood (March 2, 1838 — March 25, 1910), sometimes written as David Duffield Wood or David Duffel Wood, was an American composer, educator, and musician. He was blind from early childhood. Wood was the organist and choir master at St. Stephen's Episcopal Church in Philadelphia for 46 years.

== Early life and education ==
David Duffle Wood was born in 1838 near Pittsburgh, one of the six sons of Jonathan Humphreys Wood and Wilhelmina Jones Wood. Through illness and accident, he lost his vision as a young child. He was five years old in 1843 when he was enrolled in the Institute for the Instruction of the Blind in Philadelphia. By the time he was sixteen, he was listed in the school's reports as an assistant music teacher. Beyond music, he also studied mathematics with James G. Blaine, while the future U. S. Secretary of State was a young teacher at the school for the blind.

== Career ==
Wood was hired as organist at St. Stephen's Church in 1864, and added the title choir master in 1870. He gave his first major recital in 1868, with a program of Bach, Mozart, Beethoven, Handel and Mendelssohn. In 1894, St. Stephen's marked the 30th year of Wood's position as organist with a celebration. A celebration dinner and a silver loving cup presented in 1904 marked his 40th year of service. Concurrent with his employment at St. Stephen's, Wood was also organist and music director at the Russell Conwell's Baptist Temple from 1884 until his death. He played evening services at the Baptist Temple and morning Services at the Episcopal church.

In addition to his church work, Wood taught at the Philadelphia Musical Academy for thirty years, and had a busy schedule of private pupils as well, including composer Frances McCollin, hymn writer William J. Kirkpatrick, and composer Frederick Maxson. He was also music instructor at the Pennsylvania Institute of the Blind, and director of the school's choir, beginning officially as an assistant in 1862. He became principal instructor of music beginning in 1887, and continued in that role until his death. His fiftieth year of association with the institution was marked with a celebration and concert at the school. In connection with his teaching, Wood published A Dictionary of Musical Terms for Use with the Blind (1869).

Wood was often called "Dr. David D. Wood" in his later years, a title derived from an honorary Doctorate of Music conferred upon him by Temple College. He was also the founder and president of the American Organ Players' Club. Wood was noted as a performer of Bach on organ, considered "among the highest achievements of the musician" in his time.

== Personal life and legacy ==
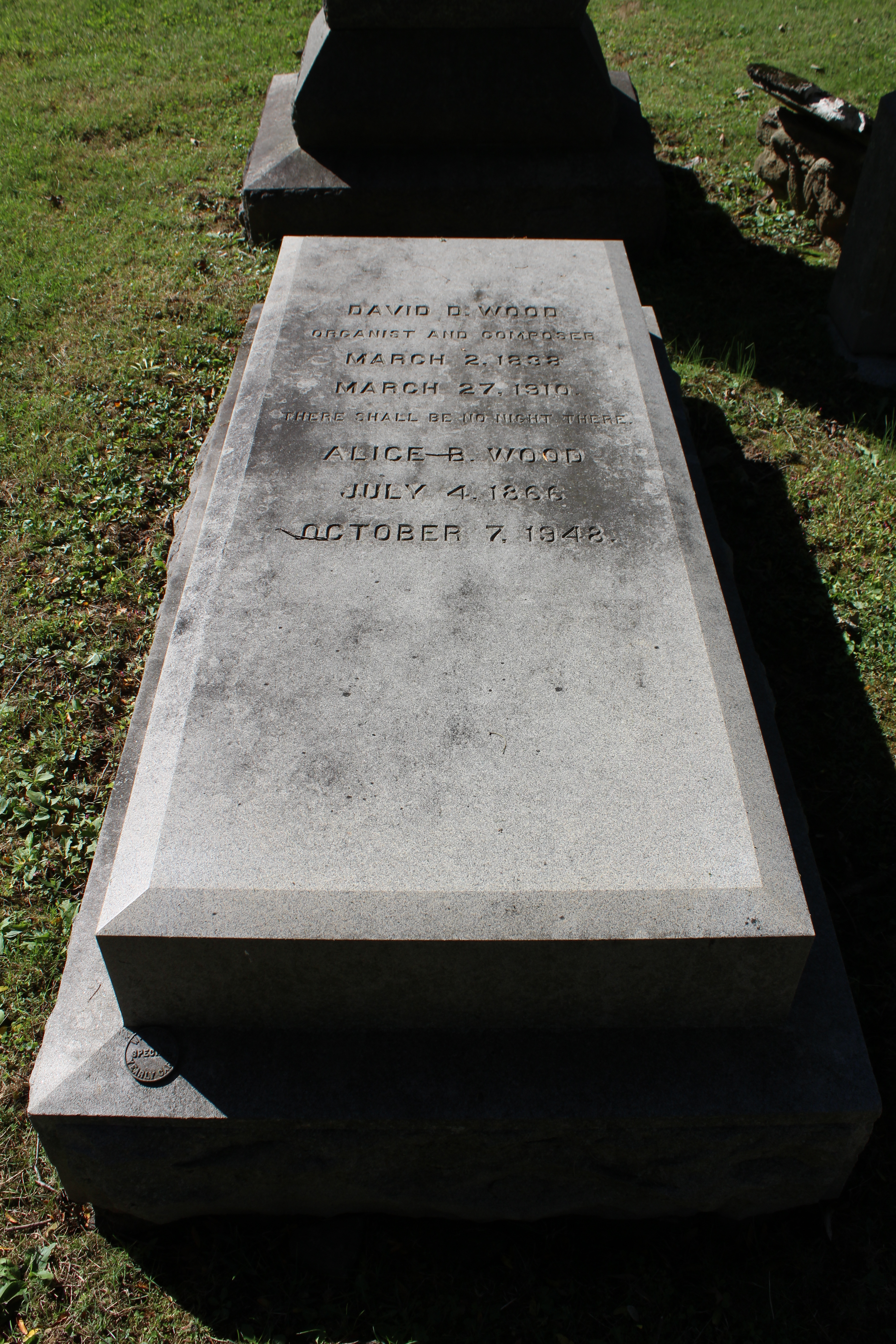
David Duffield Wood tombstone in West Laurel Hill Cemetery

David Duffle Wood married Rachel E. Laird, who was also blind, in 1856. They had four children. David was widowed when Rachel died in 1895. He married again in 1898, to his assistant Alice M. Burdette, and they had one child. Wood died in 1910, after a brief illness with pneumonia, aged 72 years. A memorial sculpture of Wood was commissioned, created by local Philadelphia artist Charles Grafly, and dedicated by his admirers, and installed at St. Stephen's.

A service of music dedicated to the choral works of David D. Wood was presented at Philadelphia's Chapel of the Mediator in 1920. In 1938, St. Stephen's Episcopal Church held a "Festival of Music" to mark the 100th anniversary of Wood's birth.
