= Kayoko Kumono =

Former Takarazuka Girls' Revue Company

Kayoko Kumono (1908 - 1991) (雲野かよ子 in Japanese, or くもの かよこ in kana) was the former Takarazuka Girls' Revue Company. She was a person in the class of the leading daughter of the Tsuki Troupe. She was born in Kanda-ku, Tokyo (now Chiyoda-ku, Tokyo). Her nickname was Hana-chan. Her stage name, along with her older sister, came from a poem by Henjō included in the Ogura Hyakunin Isshu. Otome Amatsu who served as the top star and director of the Takarazuka Revue Moon Troupe, is her older sister. She also had a younger sister, Tsuruko Ikebe.

== Life ==
Kayoko was born in 1908 as the younger sister of Otome Amatsu. In 1921, Kayoko entered the Takarazuka Music and Opera School (current Takarazuka Music School) as a member of the 11th class, and made her stage debut in 1923. At that time, the school and the theater company were one, and admission was equal to joining the company. In 1923, Kayoko played the role of Toyotama-hime in "Niisan Heikou". In 1924, Kayoko played Tsuruchiyo, the young prince of the Oshu Date family in Masaoka no Tsubone. In 1925, Kayoko played the role of Setsu in "Kuruma Kuyo". In 1942, Kayoko left the Takarazuka Revue Company. Kayoko married Tadashi Kawaguchi after leaving the company. Kayoko was in Shanghai during the war and withdrew from Shanghai to Japan after the war as a repatriate. After Kayoko returned to Japan, she worked as a teacher at Takarazuka Music School. After Kayoko's death, she was inducted into the Takarazuka Revue Hall of Fame in 2014 with her older sister Otome. The Tezuka Osamu family lived next door to Kayoko's parents' house.
