= 2025 Morsø municipal election =

Municipal election in Denmark

← 2021	18 November 2025	2029 →

All 21 seats to the Morsø municipal council 11 seats needed for a majority
- Turnout: 11,881 (75.7%) ▲2.5%
	First party	Second party	Third party
	V	A	B
Party	Venstre	Social Democrats	Social Liberals
Last election	11 seats, 46.1%	6 seats, 29.5%	1 seat, 3.7%
Seats won	8	7	2
Seat change	▼3	▲1	▲1
Popular vote	3,975	3,657	732
Percentage	34.0%	31.2%	6.3%
Swing	▼12.1%	▲1.7%	▲2.6%
	Fourth party	Fifth party	Sixth party
	C	Æ	O
Party	Conservatives	Denmark Democrats	Danish People's Party
Last election	1 seat, 5.3%	Did not stand	1 seat, 6.1%
Seats won	1	1	1
Seat change	0	▲1	0
Popular vote	940	872	603
Percentage	8.0%	7.4%	5.2%
Swing	▲2.7%	New	▼1.0%
	Seventh party
	F
Party	Green Left
Last election	0 seats, 2.1%
Seats won	1
Seat change	▲1
Popular vote	597
Percentage	5.1%
Swing	▲3.0%
Mayor before election
Hans Ejner Bertelsen
Venstre
Mayor after election
Jens Dahlgaard
Social Democrats

The 2025 Morsø Municipal election was held on November 18, 2025, to elect the 21 members to sit in the regional council for the Morsø Municipal council, in the period of 2026 to 2029. Venstre won an absolute majority in 2021, but lost 3 seats, and their absolute majority following this election. This would result in a majority outside Venstre forming, consisting of the Social Democrats, Conservatives, Social Liberals, Green Left and Danish People's Party, which would hand Jens Dahlgaard from the Social Democrats, the mayoral position, becoming a rare mayoral gain for the party in the 2025 Danish local elections.

== Background ==
In the 2021 election, Hans Ejner Bertelsen won re-election, after it was clear that Venstre would win 11 seats, and would hold their absolute majority. In March 2021, he won as Venstre mayoral candidate for this election.

== Electoral system ==
For elections to Danish municipalities, a number varying from 9 to 31 are chosen to be elected to the municipal council. The seats are then allocated using the D'Hondt method and a closed list proportional representation. Morsø Municipality had 21 seats in 2025.

Unlike in Danish General Elections, in elections to municipal councils, electoral alliances are allowed.

== Electoral alliances ==
=== Electoral Alliance 1 ===
Party		Political alignment
B	Social Liberals	Centre to Centre-left
F	Green Left	Centre-left to Left-wing
Ø	Red-Green Alliance	Left-wing to Far-Left

=== Electoral Alliance 2 ===
Party		Political alignment
V	Venstre	Centre-right
Æ	Denmark Democrats	Right-wing to Far-right

== Results by polling station ==
Division	A	B	C	F	O	V	Æ	Ø
Division	%	%	%	%	%	%	%	%
Nordmors	23.4	4.2	13.8	6.2	7.3	29.7	11.4	3.9
Midtmors	27.3	4.8	9.7	5.5	6.0	35.7	8.5	2.5
Sydmors	23.5	6.5	8.8	3.5	6.3	35.3	13.2	2.8
Sydvestmors	17.6	14.7	5.3	4.0	9.2	37.9	8.0	3.3
Nykøbing Hallen	38.5	5.5	6.8	5.4	3.4	32.7	5.0	2.8

== Results ==
Party		Votes	%	+/-	Seats	+/-
Morsø Municipality
V	Venstre	3,975	33.95	-12.14	8	-3
A	the Social Democrats	3,657	31.24	+1.72	7	+1
C	the Conservatives	940	8.03	+2.71	1	0
Æ	Denmark Democrats	872	7.45	New	1	New
B	the Social Liberals	732	6.25	+2.57	2	+1
O	the Danish People's Party	603	5.15	-0.97	1	0
F	Green Left	597	5.10	+3.00	1	+1
Ø	the Red-Green Alliance	332	2.84	+0.31	0	0
Total		11,708	100	N/A	21	N/A
Invalid votes		38	0.24	-0.01		
Blank votes		135	0.86	+0.32		
Turnout		11,881	75.69	+2.47		
Source: valg.dk

== Opinion polls ==
Polling firm	Fieldwork date	Sample size	V	A	O	C	B	Ø	F	Æ	Lead
Epinion	4 Sep - 13 Oct 2025	433	33.3	31.6	5.2	5.4	3.2	2.2	4.7	14.1	1.7
2024 european parliament election	9 Jun 2024		20.3	19.0	7.4	5.2	2.7	2.4	10.9	21.4	1.1
2022 general election	1 Nov 2022		15.3	36.5	2.3	2.9	1.0	1.9	3.6	22.1	14.4
2021 regional election	16 Nov 2021		40.9	33.8	2.9	11.6	2.4	2.5	1.5	–	7.1
2021 municipal election	16 Nov 2021		46.1 (11)	29.5 (6)	6.1 (1)	5.3 (1)	3.7 (1)	2.5 (0)	2.1 (0)	–	16.6
