= Marion Mitchell Ochsner =

American clubwoman

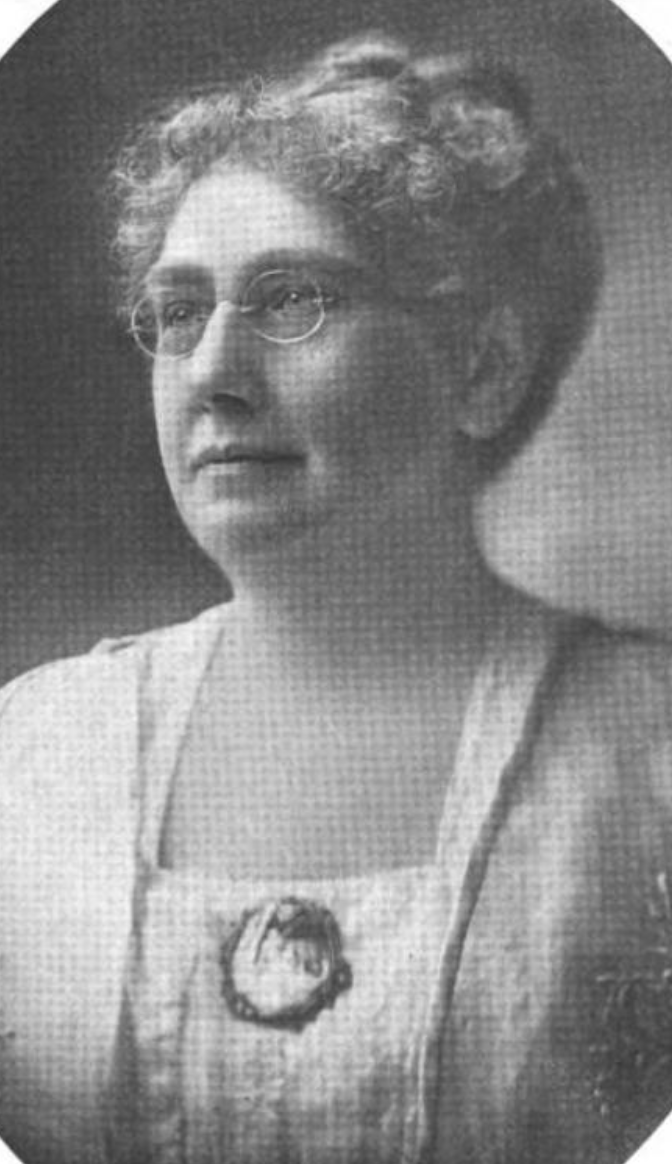
- Marion M. Ochsner, from a 1917 publication
- Born: Marion Hubbard Mitchell; January 2, 1857
- Died: January 4, 1932 (age 75); Chicago, Illinois, U.S.
- Occupation: Clubwoman
- Known for: President, National Federation of Music Clubs
- Children: 2, incl. Berta Ochsner

Marion Hubbard Mitchell Ochsner (January 2, 1857 – January 4, 1932) was an American nurse, educator, and clubwoman, based in Chicago. She was president of the National Federation of Music Clubs during World War I.

== Career ==
In 1883, Marion H. Mitchell was one of the first graduates of the Illinois Training School for Nurses. She was superintendent of a nursing school before she married in 1888. She was elected president of the National Federation of Music Clubs in 1915. She was also president of the Chicago Federation of Women's Clubs, and of the Chicago chapter of the MacDowell League. She was president of the advisory board of the Women's Symphony Orchestra of Chicago.

During World War I, Ochsner organized weekly concerts for morale, and held a monthly dinner and musicale at her home for sailors stationed in Chicago. She addressed the convention of the Ohio State Music Teachers' Association in 1918.

== Publications ==
- "A Call for War Service" (1917)
- "The MacDowell League within the Federation" (1918)
- "Camp Recreation Work of the Chicago Music Clubs" (1918)

== Personal life ==
Mitchell married Albert J. Ochsner, a prominent surgeon, in 1888. They had two children, Albert H. and Bertha, who was later known as Berta Ochsner, a noted dancer and choreographer. Her husband died in 1925, and she died in 1932, at the age of 75, in Chicago. "The spirit and the soul that was Marion Ochsner can not die!" wrote her colleague Narcissa H. Yager in a club publication. "Those of us who have known her intimately for many years know that her soul will go marching on; she will continue to lead all whom she has led."
