= Narcissa Yager =

American clubwoman

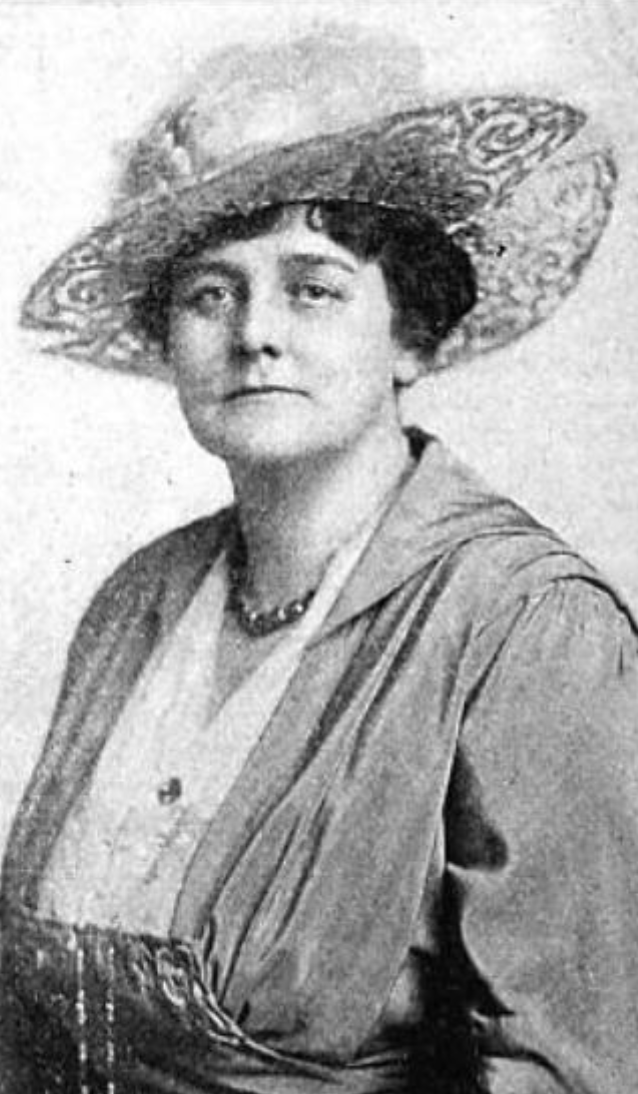
- Narcissa Yager, from a 1917 publication
- Born: Narcissa Elizabeth Harrison; August 5, 1875; Pittsburgh, Pennsylvania, U.S.
- Died: September 8, 1945 (aged 70); Oak Park, Illinois, U.S.
- Occupations: Clubwoman, arts patron, suffragist

Narcissa Elizabeth "Bess" Harrison Yager (August 5, 1875 – September 8, 1945) was an American clubwoman, arts patron, and suffragist, active in the General Federation of Women's Clubs and the Daughters of the American Revolution. She was president of the American Opera Society of Chicago and the Illinois Federation of Music Clubs.

== Early life ==
Yager was born in Pittsburgh, Pennsylvania, the daughter of Williamson Riddle Harrison and Anna Eliza Griffin Harrison. She was raised in Canton, Ohio, where she studied with Anna Meller Sheib. She also studied in Chicago with Samuel Kayser.

== Career ==
Yager was a church soloist, and represented Oak Park, Illinois, at the national conference of the Daughters of the American Revolution in 1908. Also in 1908, she was a soloist at a performance of Handel's Messiah in Ohio. She was active in the cause of women's suffrage; she sang at the 1912 banquet of the Chicago Political Equality League, and she was a delegate to the NAWSA national convention in 1917.

Much of Yager's clubwork was focused on music. She was second vice-president of the Chicago Woman's Music Club when it was founded in 1914, and president of the Illinois Federation of Music Clubs, and she was active in the General Federation of Music Clubs. She chaired the federation's national contest for young artists in 1917 and 1921. During World War I, she directed the federation's community singing events.

Yager was a founder and president of the American Opera Society of Chicago in the 1920s, working with Marion Mitchell Ochsner, Edith Rockefeller McCormick, and other clubwomen to promote English-language opera productions. She was in charge of music at the Chicago World's Fair in 1933.

Yager sold her quilt collection to Andrew and Mary Dole in 1938.

== Personal life ==
Harrison married insurance executive Louis Eugene Yager in 1897. They had three daughters. Her husband died in 1936, and she died in 1945, at the age of 70, in Oak Park. Her Queen Anne-style home is now known as the Purcell-Yager House, and is a designated historic landmark in Oak Park.
