= Otome Amatsu =

Japanese dancer

Otome Amatsu (9 October 1905 – 30 May 1980) (天津乙女 in Japanese, or あまつ おとめ in kana) was a Master of Japanese dance, TV and musical actress most widely recognized as Takarazuka Revue Leader of the Moon Troupe from 1928 to 1933. She later served as a director of the Takarazuka Revue Company. Her stage name was derived from a poem by Henjō in the Ogura Hyakunin Isshu. She was also called "Treasure of Takarazuka".

== Life ==
Otome real name was Eiko Torii (鳥居 栄子 Torii Eiko). Otome was born on October 9, 1905, in Tokyo. Otome joined the Takarazuka Girls' Revue Company (current Takarazuka Revue Company) in response to student recruitment when the first performance in Tokyo was held (1918). At that time, Otome became the first member (student) from Tokyo along with Otowako Hatsuse and Shizuko Hisakata. Otome appeared in many dance works, including the opera "Parisette", "Boshibari" and "Yakkodojoji". Otome also played the role of Ushiwakamaru in Kurama Tengu (1919), and she also played samurai role in Jorokumo (1924). Since Otome was transferred to the head of the newly established dance department, she devoted herself to teaching the younger generation and nurtured many star members. Otome was awarded the Medal with Purple Ribbon in 1958 in recognition of her devotion to Japanese dance for 40 years. Otome was also awarded the Fourth Order of the Precious Crown in 1976. On May 30, 1980, Otome died while still in the group. After the death of Otome, she was inducted into the Hall of Fame in 2014 to commemorate the 100th anniversary of the Takarazuka Revue. Otome's younger sisters were Kayoko Kumono and Tsuruko Ikebe (池邊鶴子, new font: 池辺鶴子).
