= Margaret H'Doubler =

American dance instructor

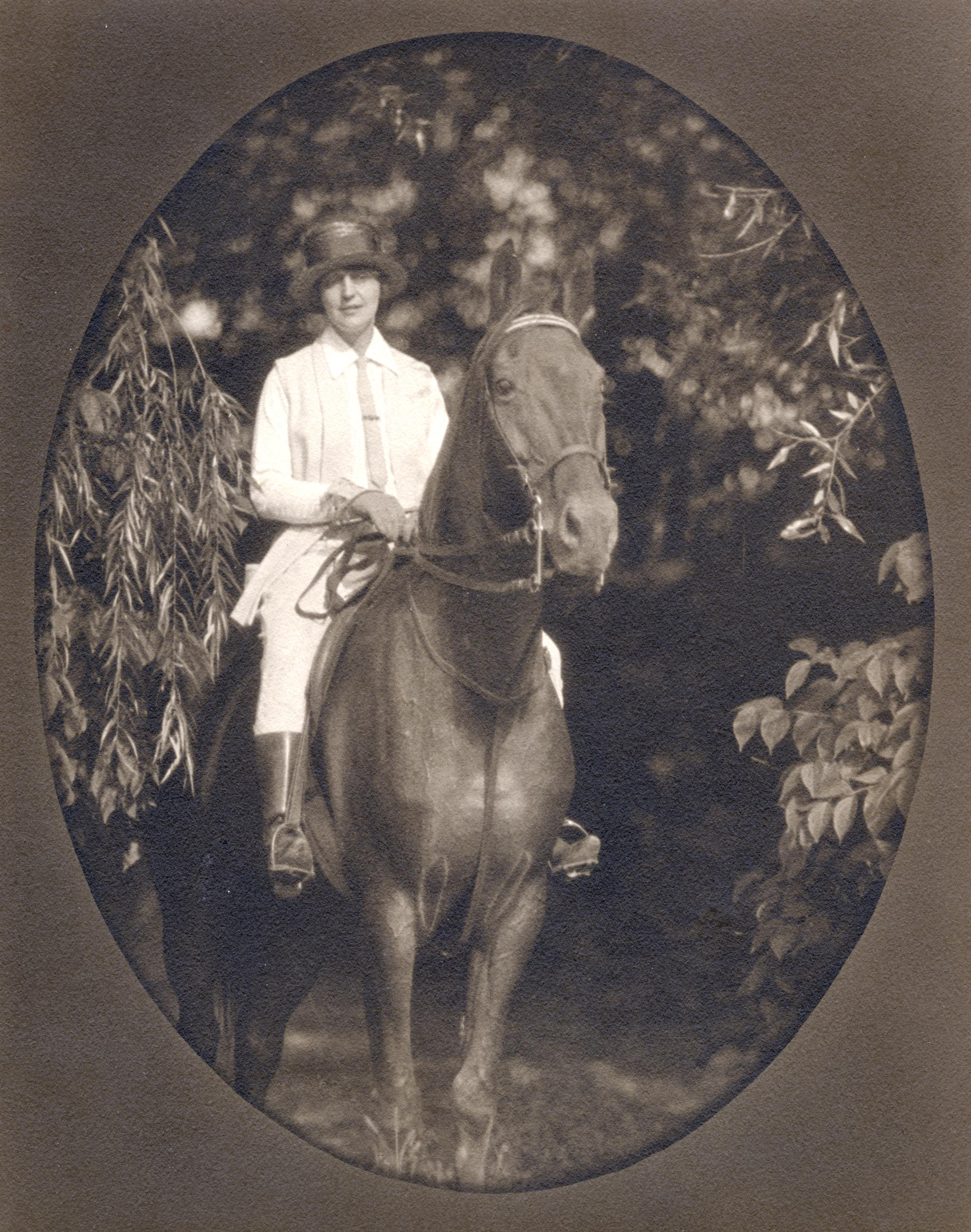
- H'Doubler riding her horse "Fire," ca. 1925
- Born: April 26, 1889; Beloit, Kansas, U.S.
- Died: March 26, 1982 (aged 92); Springfield, Missouri, U.S.

Academic background
- Education: University of Wisconsin–Madison; Teachers College, Columbia University

Academic work
- Discipline: Dance education
- Institutions: University of Wisconsin–Madison
- Notable works: A Manual Of Dancing: Suggestions And Bibliography For The Teacher Of Dancing

Margaret Newell H'Doubler (April 26, 1889 – March 26, 1982) was an American dance educator, who is known for creating the first dance major at the University of Wisconsin. Her dance pedagogy was a blend of expressing emotions and scientific description. She used her knowledge about the body to help create movement to express what the dancers were feeling. She wrote five books about her pedagogy and about the importance of dance in education. Among H'Doubler's students was Anna Halprin, a post-modern dance pioneer.

== Early life ==
Margaret Newell H'Doubler was born April 26, 1889, in Beloit, Kansas, to Sarah Emerson Todd and Charles Wright H'Doubler. The family name of H'Doubler is a contraction of Hougen-Doubler. In 1903 the family moved to Madison, Wisconsin, because Margaret's older brother had been accepted to the University of Wisconsin to study math and biology. H'Doubler looked up to her brother because she also had an interest in biology. She graduated from Madison High School in 1906, where she participated in basketball and baseball.

She attended the University of Wisconsin to major in biology and minor in philosophy. In 1910, she graduated and was given a job as an assistant instructor teaching basketball, baseball, and swimming. These courses were under the newly established Department of Physical Education for Women.

In May 1916, H'Doubler was encouraged by department head Blanche Trilling to take a one-year leave from UW-Madison to attend Columbia University Teachers College for graduate work in philosophy and aesthetics. After struggling to find a dance form she enjoyed, she met the music teacher, Alys Bentley. Bentley had her students move in relation to music while lying on the floor. Through this, H'Doubler came to discover a lasting fascination in how students could find their own movement with the help of the relative gravitational freedom of floorwork.

== Dance pedagogy ==
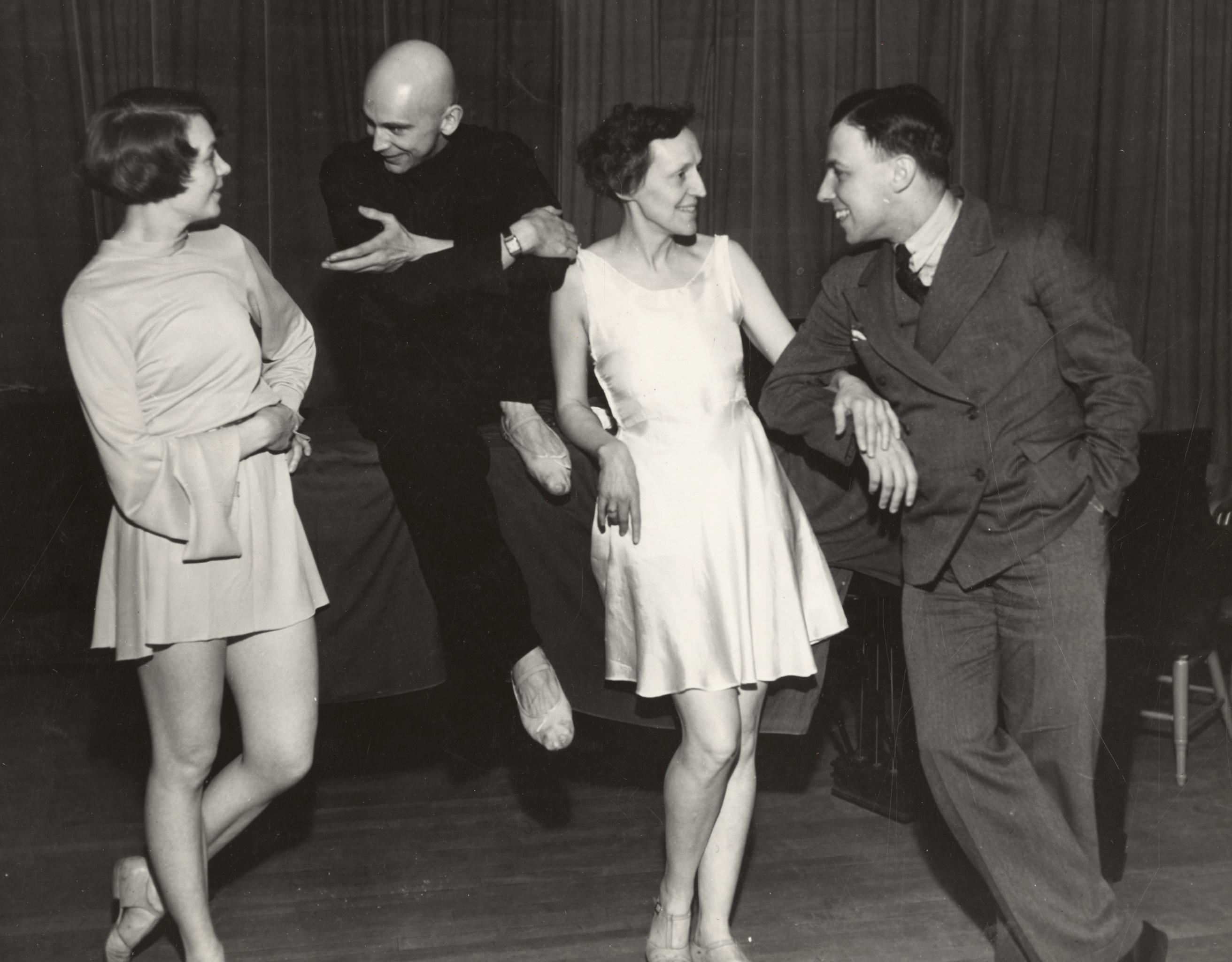
H'Doubler (third from left) in the studio at UW, 1922

H'Doubler began teaching dance in the summer of 1917. She described dance as an art and science which formed her foundation. Her theory of dance was viewed as acceptable because it was feminine and aesthetic. She taught exercises based on her idea of natural body movement; this was movement that did not require formal dance technique. She started with her students on the floor and then progressed to standing positions. She was interested in how the body reacted to the "structural changes of position of the body" and "self generated creativity".

She wanted her students to express their own ideas and feelings through movement, often asking them to describe their movements in scientific terms. After coming up with her theory of teaching dance, she wrote Manual of Dancing: Suggestions and Bibliography for the Teacher of Dancing in 1921. Her fourth book, Dance: A Creative Art Experience was published in 1940. In it she explains her theory of dance pedagogy about the expression of one's own thoughts and feelings through dance. She states that the technique is "training the mind to use the body as an expressive instrument". H'Doubler highlights the teacher's ability to inspire confidence in students so they will not be afraid of what they will reveal when expressing their own feelings through dance. In this book she includes her principles of composition: Climax, Transition, Balance, Sequence, Repetition, Harmony, Variety and Contrast.

In 1918 H'Doubler founded a group of dancers called Orchesis, which is Greek for expressive gesture. One of the early members and lopngtime supporters of Orchesis at Wisconsin was dancer and choreographer Berta Ochsner. The University of Wisconsin opened Lathrop Hall in 1921, which was a studio devoted to dance. This was also the first university to develop dance courses. In 1926, she collaborated with Dean Sellery and the faculty of the School of Education to develop the first curriculum establishing dance as a major.

Her approach to dance education was to "enable each individual to live as fully as possible" and believed the "educational process must be based upon scientific facts concerning the nature of human life". In her thinking and teaching, she advocated focusing on kinesthetic awareness in terms of three phases: (1.) feedback, which she describes as bringing information from the muscles, joints, and tendons; (2.) associative, which takes place exclusively in the brain; and (3.) feed-forward, the process of sending messages back to the muscles.

== Legacy ==
H'Doubler retired from the university in 1954. She continued to be a guest speaker and teach master classes until her death in 1982. In 1963 she was a Heritage Award recipient of the National Dance Association. After receiving a $4 million donation in 1998, the University of Wisconsin-Madison renovated Lathrop Hall and with a new theatre named the Margaret H'Doubler Performance Space.

H'Doubler died on March 26, 1982.

== Other ==
H'Doubler's grand niece and namesake is the screenwriter Margaret Nagle.
