= Orchesis Dance Company =

American college dance group

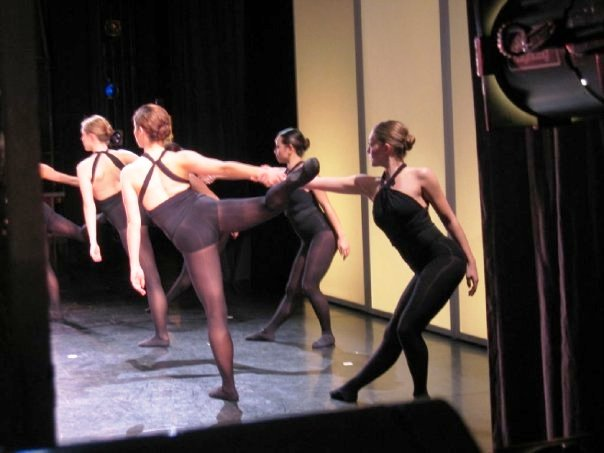
Strange Prisoners being performed by Orchesis Dance Company in 2008.

Orchesis Dance Company is Cal Poly San Luis Obispo's on-campus dance company that is affiliated with the Theatre and Dance Department. It is composed of approximately thirty students, alumni, and staff. Orchesis offers its dancers lessons in performance quality, education in technique, and a chance for artistic growth.

== The “Orchesis” idea ==
In the early twentieth century, the idea of women studying the art of dance or participating freely in an artistic experience was not widely accepted. Margaret H’Doubler, however, created the first dance education program in the university system. Her legacy begins at the University of Wisconsin in the Physical Education Department. H’Doubler combined creative and scientific approaches to dance. She wanted to give the dancers on campus a chance to perform and eventually founded the "Orchesis Dance Club" in 1918. The word "orchesis," derived from the Greek word "orchestra," means the art or act of dancing. This idea of a performing dance club spread through universities nationwide.

== Orchesis at Cal Poly ==
The Orchesis Dance Company at Cal Poly was created by Dr. Moon Ja Minn Suhr. She received her schooling in Korea and graduated from Ewha Womans University. She received her master's degree in Dance Education from The University of Northern Colorado and founded the Orchesis Dance Company at Cal Poly in the same year. In 1988, Dr. Suhr received her Ph.D. from Texas Woman's University in Dance and the Related Arts. Dr. Suhr directed the Orchesis Dance Company at Cal Poly San Luis Obispo from 1969 until 2000. She remains an avid supporter of the company and continues to teach in the Theatre and Dance Department.

== Auditions ==
To become a member of the Orchesis Dance Company, one must audition due to the limited number of places in the company. Auditions occur during the first week of Fall Quarter in the Moon Ja Minn Suhr Dance Studio (located by Crandall Gymnasium) Preparatory workshops are held that Tuesday and Wednesday, and the directors teach auditioning dancers a modern, jazz, and ballet combination. A panel of dance faculty from Cal Poly and the student interns watch groups of three perform these combinations. Audition results are usually posted by midnight.

Once members accept their invitation into the company, they are required to enroll into Dance 345: Choreography & Workshop in Dance Concert Preparation (four units), and in Winter Quarter with Dance 346: Dance Production (also four units). Both of these classes (345 and 346) include an activity (class) and a lab. Although Orchesis is an ASI Club, it is also known as an academic organization because it is funded through the Instructionally Related Activities for the Theatre and Dance Department at Cal Poly.

== Style: Technique and choreography ==
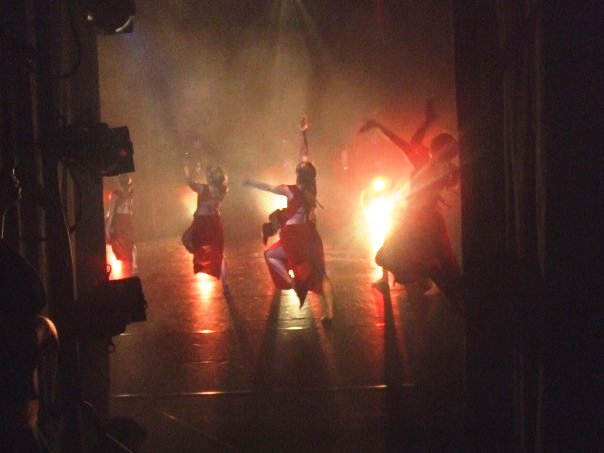
Orchesis Dance Company performing a modern piece in 2008.

The Orchesis Dance Company performs in major styles of dance, including ballet, modern, contemporary, jazz, lyrical, and tap. Ballet is the basis of other styles and is a requirement for Orchesis members. Modern dance is any style that rejects traditional ballet training. Contemporary dance focuses on choreographic and performance processes. Jazz dance is more rhythmic and isolated than the other forms of dance. Lyrical dance is a fusion of ballet and jazz techniques and focuses on interpreting lyrics to a song, words of a poem, or the emotions of the dancer or choreographer. Tap dancing is connected to Scottish and Irish reels and African-American slave dances. It pays strict attention to rhythm. All of these styles are featured in the Orchesis Dance Company Annual Concert.

== Guest choreographers ==
Guest Artists Dennon and Sayhber Rawles, Davis Robertson, whose choreography was featured in Robert Altman’s film The Company, has set modern ballet pieces for Orchesis members. Robert Moses, of the San Francisco based company Robert Moses’ Kin, choreographed his piece called Lucifer’s Prance for Orchesis' 2008 production. Mike Esperanza, founder of the BARE Dance Company in Southern California set a piece for the company in 2006. David Dorfman, founder of David Dorfman Dance, choreographed a piece in the "Transcend" production for the company in 2016.
