= Grace Cornell Graff =

American ballet and modern dancer

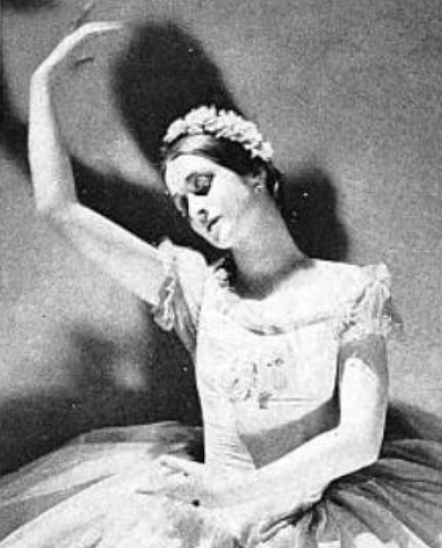
- Grace Cornell, from a 1929 publication
- Born: Grace Cornell; 1906; Chicago, Illinois
- Died: 1992 (aged 85–86); Great Barrington, Massachusetts
- Known for: Dance
- Movement: Modern dance
- Spouse: Kurt Graff

Grace Cornell Graff (born Grace Cornell, 1906–1992), an American ballet and modern dancer, was part of a professional dance duo with her husband, Kurt Graff. During the 1930s, the Graffs established a ballet company, Graff Ballet, and founded the Little Concert House, a dance studio, dance theater, and home, in Chicago, Illinois. In the late 1940s, the Graffs moved to Hopkinton, New Hampshire and turned a colonial home into an artists' colony. The property was known as Meadow Hearth Theatre Art Center.

== Biography ==
Grace Cornell Graff was born in Chicago, Illinois in 1906. In 1923, she began her dance training with Adolph Bolm in Chicago, Illinois. Cornell made her solo dance concert debut at the Théâtre des Champs-Elysées, in Paris, France, and toured Western Europe with Bolm's company in the late 1920s. In the fall of 1928, she made her American debut at the Booth Theater in New York City where she appeared with Frank Parker, a dancer.

From 1929 to 1931, Cornell studied modern dance with Rudolf von Laban in Berlin, Germany and worked with Martha Graham's dance group in New York City. While studying with Laban, Cornell met and danced with Kurt Graff. In 1932, Cornell and Graff left Germany to perform and tour the United States together.

Cornell and Graff followed up their 1932 to 1933 United States tour with a tour of Europe. Cornell married Graff in 1934. In 1935, the Graffs founded the Little Concert House, a dance theater, studio, and home, in Chicago, Illinois. The following year they established their own dance company, Graff Ballet. The company's repertoire included ballet and modern dance pieces.

In the late 1940s, the Graffs established an artists' colony in Hopkinton, New Hampshire known as Meadow Hearth Theatre Art Center. The property, originally a colonial home, featured an outdoor theater, dance studios, and residential buildings. The Graffs used Meadow Hearth Theatre Art Center to produce summer dance festivals, concerts, and plays, as well as offer modern and square dance lessons to the public through the 1950s.

Grace Cornell Graff died in 1992 in Great Barrington, Massachusetts.
