= Bert Rogers =

Australian rules footballer (1916–1980)

Personal information
- Full name: Albert Edward Winter Rogers
- Born: 17 December 1916; Donald, Victoria
- Died: 4 May 1980 (aged 63); Frankston, Victoria
- Original team: Canterbury / Korong Vale / Beulah
- Height: 182 cm (6 ft 0 in)
- Weight: 91 kg (201 lb)

Playing career^{1}
Years	Club	Games (Goals)
1943–1946	Hawthorn	30 (17)
- ^{1} Playing statistics correct to the end of 1946.

Albert Edward Winter Rogers (17 December 1916 – 4 May 1980) was an Australian rules footballer who played for the Hawthorn Football Club in the Victorian Football League (VFL).

== Family ==
The son of Albert Edward Rogers, and May Teresa Rogers (1885-1980), née Murphy, Albert Edward Winter Rogers was born at Donald, Victoria on 17 December 1916.

He married Veronica Lilian Bombardier (1903-) in 1939.

== Football ==
"A real stalwart ruckman. [Bert Rogers] can take the hard knocks, and gives great protection to the smaller men. Is very consistent in his play, although not spectacular. Joined Hawthorn in 1943".

Recruited from the Beulah Football Club in the Southern Mallee Football League.
