= Otowako Hatsuse =

- Born: 7 February 1902; Hokkaido prefecture
- Died: 19 September 1993 (aged 91)
- Other name: Shoji Yae
- Education: Tokyo Women's Gakuen Junior and Senior High School
- Occupation: actress
- Known for: Leader, Moon Troupe
- Notable work: Kunisada Chuji

Otowako Hatsuse (初瀬 音羽子, February 7, 1902 - September 19, 1993) was a former member of the Takarazuka Girl's Revue Company. She was an actress and the leader of the Moon Troupe. Born in Hokkaido prefecture as Shoji Yae, she joined the group with her stage name Hatsuse Otowako (乙羽子).

== Life ==
Otowako was born on February 7, 1902. In 1918, after graduating from Tokyo Girls' High School (currently Tokyo Women's Gakuen Junior and Senior High School), Otowako joined the Takarazuka Girls' Revue Company (currently Takarazuka Revue Company) as a member of the 7th or 8th generation of the Takarazuka Revue Company. After that, Otowako served as the head of the Moon Troupe until 1928.

In 1919, Otowako played the role of Yajirobe in Hizakurige. In 1920, she played the role of a nanny in Kinpei Megane. In the same year, she also played the role of Lord Yasumichi, the son of the Dainagon, in Rangiku Zoshi, as well as the role of a nanny in Onatsu Kasamo no Gurui. In 1921, Otowako played the role of Dainagon's second wife, Izuna, in Chikuma Shinji.

In 1928, Otowako left the Takarazuka Girls' Revue Company at the age of 26 and has been active as an actress in the Shinkokugeki, Otoha Hatsuse (初瀬 乙羽). In 1929, she gained attention when she joined Shinkokugeki as an executive as the first actress to move from Takarazuka to another theater company.

Otowako retired in the summer of 1983. In 1987, she spent her life recuperating from illness and died on September 19, 1993, at the age of 91. Otowako was also famous for the play "Kunisada Chuji".
