= Kurt Graff =

German modern dancer and choreographer

- Born: 1910; Bonn, Germany
- Died: 1993; Great Barrington, Massachusetts
- Known for: Choreography
- Movement: Modern dance
- Spouse: Grace Cornell Graff

Kurt Graff (1910–1993), a choreographer and dancer, was part of a professional dance duo with his wife, Grace Cornell Graff. During the 1930s, Graff and Cornell established a ballet company, Graff Ballet, and founded the Little Concert House, a dance studio, dance theater, and home, in Chicago, Illinois. In the late 1940s, the Graffs moved to Hopkinton, New Hampshire and turned a colonial home into an artists' colony. The property was known as Meadow Hearth Theatre Art Center.

== Biography ==
Kurt Graff was born in Bonn, Germany in 1910. He studied dance at the Folkwang School in Essen, Germany, before studying and performing modern dance with Rudolf von Laban's dance group in Berlin, Germany. Graff met Grace Cornell in 1931 while they were both studying and performing with Laban's group. In 1932, Graff left Germany to perform and tour the United States with Cornell.

Graff and Cornell followed up their 1932 to 1933 United States tour with a tour of Europe. Graff married Cornell in 1934. In 1935, the Graffs founded the Little Concert House, a dance theater, studio, and home, in Chicago, Illinois. The following year they established their own dance company, Graff Ballet. The company's repertoire included ballet and modern dance pieces.

In the late 1940s, the Graffs established an artists' colony in Hopkinton, New Hampshire known as Meadow Hearth Theatre Art Center. The property, originally a colonial home, featured an outdoor theater, dance studios, and residential buildings. The Graffs used Meadow Hearth Theatre Art Center to produce summer dance festivals, concerts, and plays, as well as offer modern and square dance lessons to the public through the 1950s.

Kurt Graff died in 1993 in Great Barrington, Massachusetts.
