= Ernst Blum =

German footballer

Personal information
- Date of birth: 25 January 1904
- Date of death: 17 May 1980 (aged 76)
- Position: Midfielder

Senior career*
Years	Team	Apps	(Gls)
1921–1934	VfB Stuttgart		

International career
1927	Germany	1	(0)
- * Club domestic league appearances and goals

Ernst Blum (25 January 1904 – 17 May 1980) was a German international footballer.
