= Walter Silz =

- Awards: Grosses Verdienstkreuz; Guggenheim Fellowship

Academic background
- Education: Harvard University

Academic work
- Discipline: German language and literature
- Institutions: Harvard University; Washington University in St. Louis; Swarthmore College; Princeton University; Columbia University

Walter Silz (27 September 1894, Cleveland – 30 May 1980, Princeton, New Jersey) was an American professor of German language and literature and in 1965 winner of the Grosses Verdienstkreuz from West Germany.

== Biography ==
Born to a German-American family in Cleveland, Silz received his A.B. in 1917 and his Ph.D. in 1922 from Harvard University. In 1922 he married Frieda Bertha Ruprecht Osgood, the daughter of William Fogg Osgood; she died in 1937. Silz taught at Harvard and at Washington University in St. Louis before becoming a professor at Swarthmore College. He headed what was then the German section of the department of modern languages at Princeton University from 1948 to 1954. From 1954 to 1963 he held the Gebhard Chair of Germanic Languages and Literatures at Columbia University. He was twice awarded a Guggenheim Fellowship, once for the academic year 1926–1927 and again for the academic year 1960–1961. He died in 1980. His second wife, Priscilla Kramer Silz, was a professor of German at Rider College.

== Selected works ==
as author:

- Heinrich von Kleist's conception of the tragic. 1923.
- Early German romanticism. Harvard U. Press. 1929.
- Realism and reality: studies in the German novelle of poetic realism. U. of North Carolina Press. 1954.
- Heinrich von Kleist: studies in his work and literary character. U. of Pennsylvania Press. 1961.
- Hölderlin's Hyperion: a critical reading. U. of Pennsylvania Press. 1969.

as editor: German romantic lyrics. 1934.
