= Herb Hollyman =

American football coach

Biographical details
- Born: May 4, 1940; Laramie, Wyoming, U.S.
- Died: May 6, 1980 (aged 40); Dickinson, North Dakota, U.S.

Coaching career (HC unless noted)
- 1971: Dickinson State

Head coaching record
- Overall: 2–6

Herbert Charles Hollyman (May 4, 1940 – May 6, 1980) was an American football coach. Hollyman was the 12th head football coach at Dickinson State College—now known as Dickinson State University–in Dickinson, North Dakota and held that position for one season, in 1971. His coaching record at Dickinson State was 2–6.

The Herb Hollyman Memorial Scholarship is named in his honor.

== Head coaching record ==
Year	Team	Overall	Conference	Standing	Bowl/playoffs
Dickinson State Savages (North Dakota College Athletic Conference) (1971)
1971	Dickinson State	2–6	1–4	5th	
Dickinson State:		2–6	1–4		
Total:		2–6			
