= Ernst Wiemann =

German opera singer (1919–1980)

Ernst Wiemann (21 December 1919 – 17 May 1980) was a German operatic bass.

== Life and career ==
Born in Stapelburg, interested in music, Wiemann played accordion and violin as a young boy. At the age of 17 he took singing lessons and got his first engagement as a soloist in the Theater Kiel in 1940, and in 1941 in Stralsund. One year later he had a soloist contract at the Theater des Westens. His singing career was then interrupted by being drafted into the military.

After the War, Wiemann took singing lessons again and was engaged at the Gelsenkirchen Opera in the 1950/51 season. From 1955 to 1957 he sang at the opera in Staatstheater Nürnberg. From 1957 until his death in 1980 he was engaged at the Hamburg State Opera.

In 1965 he was awarded the title of Kammersänger by the Senate of the Hanseatic City of Hamburg in recognition of his artistic achievements.

Towards the end of the 50s his international career began. From 1961 until 1969 he joined the Metropolitan Opera in New York. There he sang King Heinrich in Wagner's Lohengrin as his debut role. He was especially successful there in Wagnerian parts.

Wiemann became known nationwide through numerous recordings. He can be heard in various recordings and radio takes, especially of his Met performances.

In the television films produced for the Norddeutscher Rundfunk he can be seen and heard as Rocco in Fidelio (1968) and as Veit Pogner in Die Meistersinger von Nürnberg (1970).

In May 1980 Wiemann died suddenly of heart failure in Munich at the age of 60. His grave is at the Reichelsdorfer Waldfriedhof in Nuremberg.

== Roles ==
- Beethoven: Fidelio - Rocco
- Wagner: Die Meistersinger von Nürnberg - Hans Sachs, Veit Pogner
- Wagner: Lohengrin - King Heinrich
- Wagner: Der Fliegende Holländer - Daland
- Wagner: Parsifal - Gurnemanz
- Wagner: Der Ring des Nibelungen - Fasolt, Fafner, Hunding, Hagen
- Weber: Der Freischütz - Kuno, Kaspar, Eremit

== Recordings ==
- Ludwig van Beethoven: Fidelio as Rocco (DVD, Arthaus, 2007)
- Richard Wagner: Die Meistersinger von Nürnberg as Veit Pogner (DVD, Arthaus, 2007)
- Richard Wagner: Das Rheingold as Fafner (CD, Walhall, 2012)
- Richard Wagner: Die Walküre as Hunding (CD, Walhall, 2012)
- Carl Maria von Weber: Der Freischütz as Kuno (CD, EMI, 1988)
- Wolfgang Amadeus Mozart: Don Giovanni as Il Commendatore (CD, EMI, 1990)
- Giuseppe Verdi: Il trovatore as Ferrando (CD, EXL, 1993)
- Giuseppe Verdi: Aida as Ramfis (CD, Ada Global, 1995)

== Literature ==
- Karl-Josef Kutsch, Leo Riemens: Großes Sängerlexikon. Third, extended edition. K. G. Saur, Munich 1999. Volume 5: Seidemann-Zysset, p. 3717.
