= Mylapore (Corporation zone) =

Mylapore is one of the 15 corporation zones of the Corporation of Chennai. It comprises the revenue villages of Bheemannapettai, Thiruvalluvar Nagar, Madha Perumal Puram, Karaneeswarapuram, Santhome, Mylapore, Avvai Nagar North, Raja Annamalaipuram, Avvai Nagar South, Adyar West, Adyar East, Velachery, Thiruvanmiyur West and Thiruvanmiyur East.
