= Johann Pscheidt =

Johann Pscheidt (28 March 1890 in Rădăuți – 1 May 1980 in Freilassing) was an Austrian building contractor, who stood up for Jews during the time of the National Socialism. In 1963, he achieved the title Righteous among the Nations.

== Life ==
As a “Salzburer” building contractor and fidelity merchant for Jewish companies, he went to Zagłębie Dąbrowskie (Sosnowiec, Będzin and Zawiercie) in Poland 1941, where he tried to find out how to safe Jews get punished in Nazi concentration camps and deportation. He opened a shoe creme factory called “Rekord” to support Jews in the regional Ghetto. His factory also is a shelter and through position for displaced persons from the Ghetto.

Beside that Pscheidt also gave them imitated Aryan passports and obtained for many of them work instructions from the Procurement Office in Tarnów in the work procurement office in Vienna, allocating to the refugees as a Polish foreign worker. In this way he saved 80 people in over four months time.

On 25 February 1963 Yad Vashem decided to give Johann Pscheidt the medal of Righteous Among the Nations.
