= Hannes Volotinen =

Finnish politician

Hannes Volotinen (15 August 1911, in Ilomantsi – 20 May 1980) was a Finnish politician. He was a Member of the Parliament of Finland, representing the Finnish Rural Party (SMP) from 1970 to 1972 and the Finnish People's Unity Party (SKYP) from 1972 to 1975.
