= Reginald Woodman =

English cricketer

Reginald Woodman (11 August 1905 – 20 May 1980) was an English cricketer. He was a right-handed batsman who played for Gloucestershire. He was born and died in Bristol.

Woodman's debut came in June 1925 against Derbyshire, scoring two runs in the only innings in which he batted.

Woodman's second and final first-class appearance came the following week against Sussex, against whom he scored 2 runs.
