= Pearl Swanson =

American nutritionist

Pearl Pauline Swanson
- Born: 13 September 1895; Cokato, Minnesota
- Died: 21 May 1980 (aged 84); Ames, Iowa
- Occupation: Nutritionist

Pearl Pauline Swanson (13 September 1895, Cokato, Minnesota – 21 May 1980, Ames, Iowa) was an American nutritionist. She received several prizes and honors including the Outstanding Achievement Award from the University of Minnesota in 1951 and the Borden Award in 1955. She also wrote nearly 90 papers and publications.

== Life and education ==
Pauline P. Swanson was born on 13 September 1895 in Cokato, Minnesota, to Maria Sigfridson and Frank Swanson. In 1916, she received a bachelor's degree in Home Economics from Carleton College. From 1916 to 1918 Swanson taught high school chemistry at Faribault, Minnesota. Then in 1920–1922, she held the position of instructor of chemistry at Carleton College.

In 1924, Swanson received her master's degree in nutrition from the University of Minnesota and started working as an assistant professor of nutrition at Montana State College, remaining in the position until 1927. In 1929, Swanson received Alexander Broune Cox Fellowship, and in 1930, she received her Ph.D. from Yale University. After that, she accepted a faculty appointment at Iowa State University at Ames, Iowa, where from 1936 she remained the position of professor in nutrition until her retirement in 1965.

Pearl Pauline Swanson died on 21 May 1980 in Ames, Iowa and was buried at Iowa State University Cemetery.

== Work ==
In 1944, Swanson became the first female assistant director of the Iowa State Agriculture and Home Economics Experiment Station in the United States, remaining the position until 1961. She also served as a member of the National Commission of the U.S. Department of Agriculture and was on the editorial board of Nutritional Status U.S.A., as well as associate editor of the Journal of Nutrition from 1949 to 1953.

In 1951, Swanson received the Outstanding Achievement Award from the University of Minnesota. Among other awards and honors should be mentioned the Borden Award in Nutrition in 1955, Faculty Citation from Iowa State in 1958, and the Iowa Award of Merit from Gamma Sigma Delta in 1961.

Swanson studied the role of proteins and fat in nutrition. In the center of her research were such areas of nutrition as metabolism of proteins, interrelationships of nutrients, dietary requirements of reproductions, and inorganic salts.

In 1963, Swanson published a book Calcium in nutrition. She also wrote nearly 90 papers and publications. Some of her researches received critical reviews such as her article Beef for the Unborn where based on the experiment with rats she claimed about the importance of beef in nutrition of pregnant women.

Swanson was a member of numerous organizations such as the American Home Economics Association, the American Institute for Nutrition, the American Chemical Society, the American Dietetic Association, the New York Academy of Sciences, Phi Beta Kappa, Sigma Xi, and the American Association of University Women.

== Selected publications ==
=== Books ===
- Calcium in Nutrition, 1963

=== Journal articles ===
- Pearl P. Swanson, Arthur H. Smith, Inorganic Salts in Nutrition: IX. Correlation Between Suppressed Growth and the Development of Polycythemia Induced by Feeding a Ration Poor in Salts: Two Charts, The Journal of Nutrition, Volume 8, Issue 6, December 1934, Pages 659–667
- Pearl P. Swanson, Gladys T. Stevenson, P. Mabel Nelson, A Method of Increasing Precision in Vitamin A Assay, The Journal of Nutrition, Volume 15, Issue 2, February 1938, Pages 103–12
- Miriam Brush, Wanda Willman, Pearl P. Swanson, Amino Acids in Nitrogen Metabolism with Particular Reference to the Role of Methionine: Four Figures, The Journal of Nutrition, Volume 33, Issue 4, April 1947, Pages 389–41
- Gladys Everson, Eleanor Williams, Elizabeth Wheeler, Pearl Swanson, Mattie Spivey, The Occurrence of 5 B-Vitamins in the Tissues of Pregnant Rats Fed Rations Satisfactory and Unsatisfactory for Reproduction, The Journal of Nutrition, Volume 36, Issue 4, October 1948, Pages 463–478
- Ercel S. Eppright, Virginia D. Sidwell, Pearl P. Swanson, Nutritive Value of the Diets of Iowa School Children: One Figure, The Journal of Nutrition, Volume 54, Issue 3, November 1954, Pages 371–388
- Ercel S. Eppright, Charlotte Roderuck, Virginia D. Sidwell, Pearl P. Swanson, Relationship of Estimated Nutrient Intakes of Iowa School Children to Physical and Biochemical Measurements: Three Figures, The Journal of Nutrition, Volume 54, Issue 4, December 1954, Pages 557–570
- Pearl Swanson, Ph.D., Charles Ford Langworthy —A Biographical Sketch: (August 9, 1864 – March 3, 1932), The Journal of Nutrition, Volume 86, Issue 1, May 1965, Pages 1–16
