= Hilda Jerea =

Romanian pianist and composer

Hilda Jerea (17 March 1916 – 14 May 1980) was a Romanian-Jewish pianist, conductor, and composer. Her best-known composition is the large-scale oratorio Under the Wake-Up Sun (Romanian: Sub soarele deşteptării) from 1951. She taught at the Bucharest School of Art and at the Bucharest Conservatory, and founded the Musica Nova Chamber Orchestra. She won the Robert Cremer Prize, and a number of composition prizes. She was distinguished with the State Prize of Romania and the Order of Labour.

== Life ==
Born in Iaşi, she began her education at the Conservatory of Music in Iaşi under Sofia Teodoreanu, and finished it in Bucharest where her teachers were Mihail Jora, Florica Musicescu and Dimitrie Cuclin. In Bucharest she studied harmony, counterpoint, and composition, aesthetics and composition, and piano, under Florica Musicescu. After graduation Jerea pursued further studies in Paris, where she studied composition with Noel Gallon in 1939, and with Pal Kadosa in Budapest in 1947. She learned chamber music from Leo Weiner.

Jerea taught at the Bucharest School of Art and at the Bucharest Conservatory until 1972. In 1962, she founded and conducted the Musica Nova Chamber Orchestra, which toured widely.

Jerea played the piano in concertos or chamber ensembles from 1936. Her best-known composition is the large-scale oratorio Under the Wake-Up Sun (Romanian: Sub soarele deşteptării) from 1951. She was distinguished with the State Prize of Romania and the Order of Labour, and also won the Robert Cremer Prize of 1942 and a number of other prizes for composition.

She died in Bucharest.
