= Maximiano de Sousa =

Portuguese fado singer

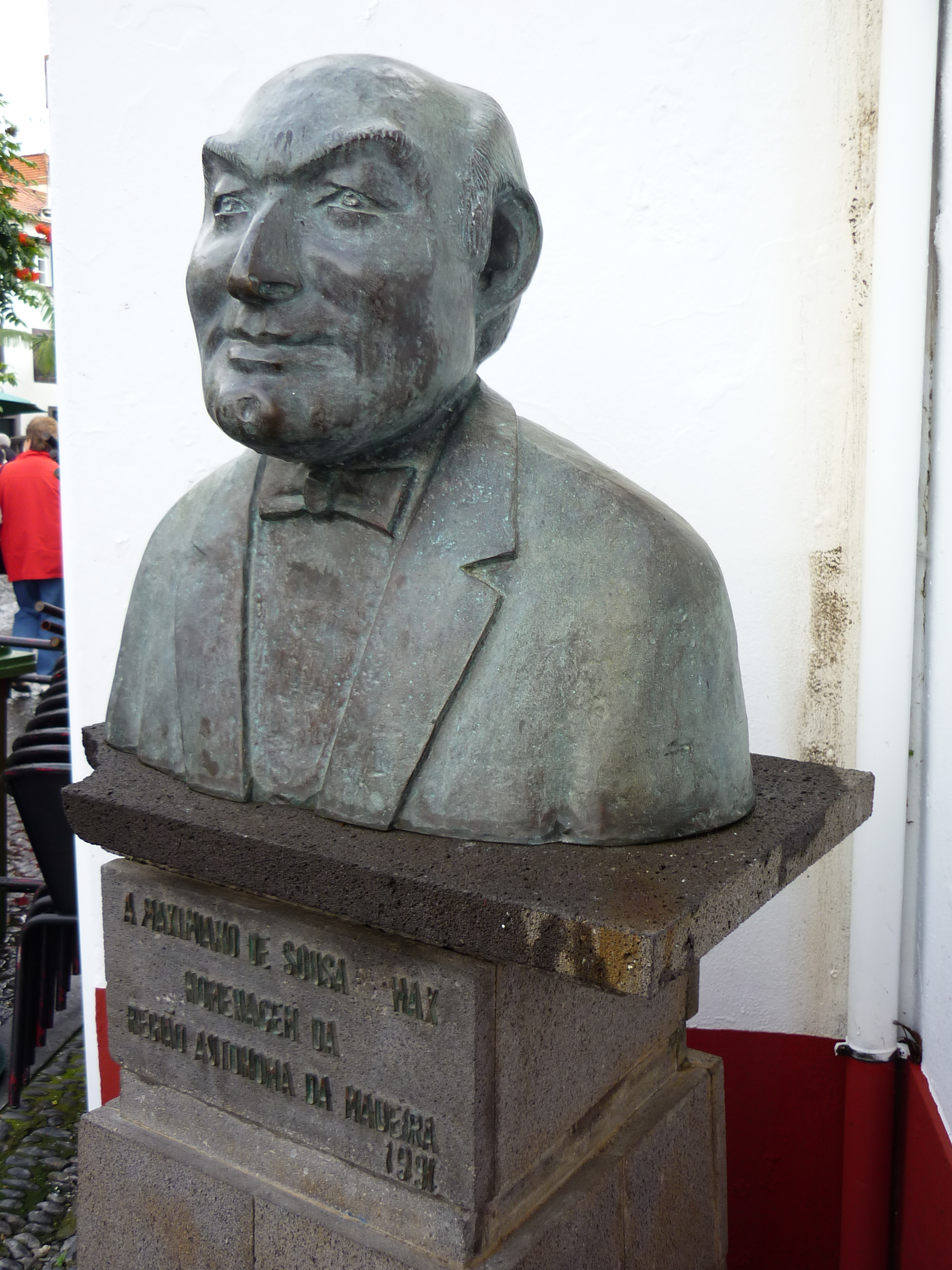

Background information
- Birth name: Maximiano de Sousa
- Also known as: Max
- Born: 20 January 1918
- Origin: Madeira, Portugal
- Died: 29 May 1980 (aged 62)
- Genres: Fado
- Occupation(s): Singer, Actor
- Instrument: Vocals

Maximiano de Sousa (20 January 1918, in Funchal, Madeira – 29 May 1980) was a Portuguese Fado singer. Max was one of the most popular Fado singers from the 1940s until well after his death in 1980.

== Personal life ==
Maximiano de Sousa, known to most people as Max, was a Madeiran (Portuguese: madeirense), born in Funchal in 1918. It was here that career started. He was a tailor, and even after becoming an artist, he long maintained that profession.

In 1936 he began working at night in a hotel bar in Funchal as a singer and continued to work as a tailor during the day. In 1957, he left for the United States where he remained for two years, afterward he toured Angola, Mozambique, South Africa, Brazil, and Argentina.

== Selected discography ==
(incomplete)

- Noites da Madeira/Bailinho da Madeira (78, VC, 1949)
- Bailinho da Madeira/Noites da Madeira (Single, Decca/VC, 1956)
- A Mula da Cooperativa / A Coisa / O Magala / O Homem do Trombone (Columbia)
- Porto Santo
- 31
- Sinal da Cruz
- Pomba Branca, Pomba Branca/Quando a Dor Bateu à Porta (Single, Decca/VC, 1974)
- As Bordadeira
- Casei com uma Velha
- Júlia Florista
- Maria Rapaz
- Maria tu tens a mania
- Mas sou fadista
- Mula da Cooperativa
- Nem ás paredes confesso
- Noite
- O Magala
- Pomba Branca
- Porto Santo
- Rosinha dos Limões
- Saudades da Ilha
- Sinal da Cruz
- Vielas de Alfama
