= Robert Paterson (cricketer) =

English cricketer

Personal information
- Full name: Robert Fraser Troutbeck Paterson
- Born: 8 September 1916; Stansted, Essex, England
- Died: 29 May 1980 (aged 63); Edinburgh, Scotland
- Batting: Right-handed
- Role: Wicket-keeper

Domestic team information
- Years: Team
- 1946–1958: Essex

Career statistics
Competition	FC
Matches	28
Runs scored	884
Batting average	22.10
100s/50s	0/6
Top score	88
Balls bowled
Wickets	13
Bowling average	35.69
5 wickets in innings	0
10 wickets in match	0
Best bowling	4/98
Catches/stumpings	16/3
- Source: Cricinfo, 19 July 2013

Robert Paterson (8 September 1916 – 29 May 1980) was an English cricketer. He played for Essex between 1946 and 1958.
