= Roman Jańczyk =

Polish footballer

Personal information
- Date of birth: 10 March 1903
- Place of birth: Łódź, Russian Empire
- Date of death: 18 May 1980 (aged 77)
- Place of death: Łódź, Poland
- Height: 1.68 m (5 ft 6 in)
- Position: Midfielder

Senior career*
Years	Team	Apps	(Gls)
1923–1935	ŁKS Łódź		

International career
1932	Poland	1	(0)
- * Club domestic league appearances and goals

Roman Jańczyk (10 March 1903 – 18 May 1980) was a Polish footballer who played as a midfielder.

He made one appearance for the Poland national team in 1932.
