= Myrtle McGrain =

American stage actress and model

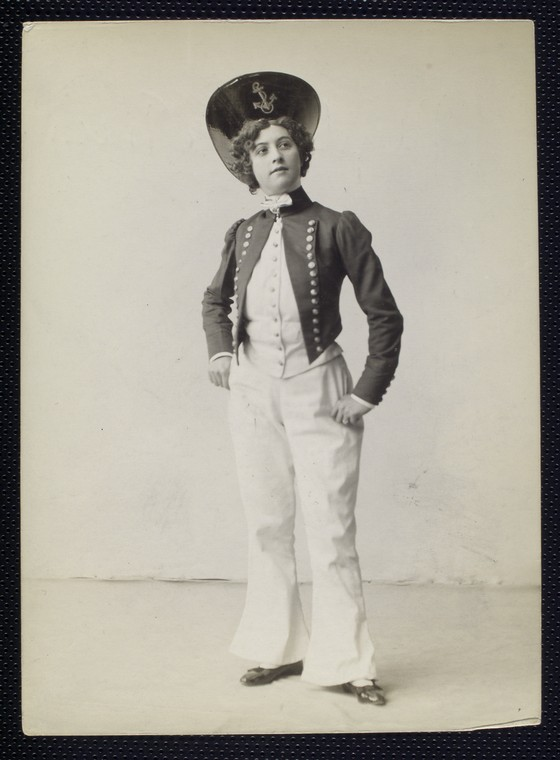
- Myrtle McGrain as Bobby Shaftoe in Babes In Toyland (1903).
- Born: July 8, 1883; Kentucky
- Died: May 17, 1980 (aged 96); Florida
- Other name: Myrtle McGrain Bacon
- Occupations: Actress, model
- Spouse: Lieutenant Colonel William J. Bacon

Myrtle McGrain (July 8, 1883 – May 17, 1980) was an American stage actress and model in the first decade of the twentieth century.

== Early life ==
Myrtle McGrain was born in Kentucky, the daughter of Daniel G. McGrain and Delila E. Blume McGrain.

== Career ==
McGrain was a stage actress, appearing with the company of Joseph Jefferson in 1901 and 1902. She was seen on Broadway in musicals Babes in Toyland (1903), The Cingalee (1904) and Sergeant Brue (1905-1906). She toured with a stock company in the American South in 1907. The following year, she was the leading lady for Mitchell's All-Star Players, another stock company. She modeled for photographs that appeared in The Burr McIntosh Monthly.

== Personal life ==
In 1915, Myrtle McGrain married Lieutenant Colonel William J. Bacon. She was widowed when he died in 1950. She died in 1980, aged 96 years, in Florida. Her gravesite is in Memphis, Tennessee.
