= Yoshie Katsurada =

Japanese mathematician

Yoshie Katsurada (Japanese: 桂田 芳枝, 3 September 1911 – 10 May 1980) was a Japanese mathematician specializing in differential geometry. She became the first Japanese woman to earn a doctorate in mathematics, in 1950, and the first to obtain an imperial university professorship in mathematics, in 1967.

== Life ==
Katsurada was born in Akaigawa, Hokkaido on 3 September 1911, a daughter of an elementary school principal. In high school in Otaru, she took special instruction in mathematics from a boys' mathematics instructor. Graduating from high school in 1929, she began auditing classes at the Tokyo Physics School, a predecessor to the Tokyo University of Science, in 1931.

She began working as an administrative assistant in the Hokkaido University Department of Mathematics in 1936. In 1938 she began study in mathematics at Tokyo Woman's Christian University, withdrawing in 1940 to transfer to Hokkaido University. She graduated from Hokkaido University in 1942, and in the same year became an assistant professor there.

In 1950, she completed a doctorate in mathematics at Hokkaido University, under the supervision of Shoji Kawaguchi, becoming the first Japanese woman to earn a doctorate in mathematics, and earning a promotion to associate professor. She remained at Hokkaido University for the remainder of her career, with research visits to Sapienza University of Rome, ETH Zurich, and the University of California, Berkeley. She was promoted to full professor in 1967, the first female professor in mathematics at a former imperial university.

She retired in 1975, and died on 10 May 1980.

== Research ==
Katsurada's early research, from the beginning of her studies into the mid-1950s, primarily concerned line elements; this was the primary interest of her advisor Shoji Kawaguchi, with whom she continued to collaborate on this subject. After visiting Heinz Hopf at ETH Zurich in 1957–1958, she shifted interests to submanifolds and hypersurfaces in Riemannian manifolds, publishing well-regarded work in this area.

== Recognition ==
Several papers in the 1972 volume of the Hokkaido Mathematical Journal are dedicated to Katsurada in honor of her 60th birthday. Katsurada was given the Hokkaido Culture Award in 1973.
