= Tina Flade =

German modern dancer

- Tina Flade, from a 1936 newspaper.
- Born: Albertine Flade; 9 March 1905; Dresden
- Died: 27 September 1997 (aged 92); Columbus, Ohio, US
- Other names: Tina Flade Mooney (after marriage)
- Occupation: Dancer

Tina Flade (9 March 1905 – 27 September 1997), born Albertine Flade, and later known as Tina Flade Mooney, was a German modern dancer. From 1934 to 1938, she taught dance at Mills College in California.

== Early life ==
Flade was born in Dresden, and trained as a pianist as a young woman. She studied modern dance with Mary Wigman.

== Career ==
Flade performed with Wigman's concert group in Germany, Austria, and Switzerland. She made her American debut in 1933, in New York; "she was gay, light, exuberant and altogether charming" recalled the New York Times' dance critic, John Martin. She danced in Los Angeles later in 1933. "There is a woodsy, faun-like loveliness", commented the Los Angeles Times critic. "She is filled with the joy of dancing and made her audience feel that dancing is a natural expression."

In 1934, she was appointed head of the dance department at Mills College in California. She developed her own dance compositions, and gave a solo show at the Bennington School of the Dance in 1935. In 1937 she taught modern dance at the Mills College Summer School, and served on a committee to study modern dance for high school physical education classes. She often collaborated with her Mills College colleague, composer and musician Henry Cowell. She also worked with San Francisco-based composer Lou Harrison. Among the dancers who studied with Flade were King Lan Chew and choreographer Valerie Bettis.

After marriage in 1938, she moved to Ohio, and taught classes for dance instructors at Ohio State University.

== Personal life ==
Flade married an American college professor, Ross Lawler Mooney, in 1938. The Mooneys traveled to Israel in 1964, when Ross Mooney was a consultant to the Israeli Ministry of Education, and she taught in a children's cultural program in Jerusalem. She was widowed in 1988, and died in Columbus, Ohio, in 1997, aged 92 years. She was buried at Union Cemetery, Franklin, Ohio.

There are interviews with Flade in the Dance Files of the Jerome Lawrence and Robert E. Lee Theatre Research Institute, Ohio State University.
