= Raymond Francis Robbins =

American painter

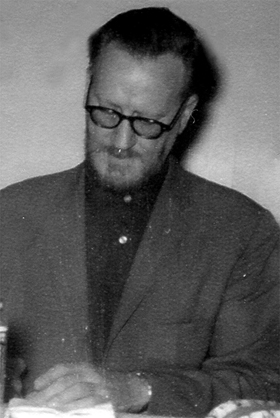
- Raymond Francis Robbins circa 1965
- Born: January 20, 1912; Boston, Massachusetts
- Died: May 24, 1980 (aged 68); Rayville, Louisiana
- Known for: Painting, Drawing

Raymond Francis Robbins (January 20, 1912 – May 24, 1980) was an American artist often known for his intricate realist paintings of the 20th century. Oil paintings dominated much of his work, but he was equally gifted in watercolors and charcoal drawings.

== Early life ==
His early life was turbulent at times. Born in Boston, Massachusetts on January 20, 1912, to Charlotte Ann Campbell, a young single woman at the time, Robbins never knew his father. He was raised Raymond Francis Rubino, the surname of his stepfather, who died unexpectedly from the 1918 flu pandemic – creating immense upheaval in the artist's young life. His widowed mother struggled to feed and support her four young children. Art may have been Robbins' escape from the turmoil and the times. Like many of his generation, Robbins came of age during the Great Depression with very little means, other than a gift for the canvas.

It is rumored that his creative pursuits began as a teenager while quarantined at Rutland State Sanatorium in Rutland, Massachusetts for several years after contracting tuberculosis in 1930. Shortly thereafter, Robbins studied at the Massachusetts School of Art (known today as Massachusetts College of Art and Design) and the South Boston School of Art. He studied under Alfred Gunnar Bjareby (1899-1967) in Rockport and Gloucester, Massachusetts. It was early on in his career that Robbins anglicized his last name of Rubino, signing most of his work with his distinctive moniker RF Robbins.

== Gaining notice and exhibitions ==
In 1938, Robbins' talent started to gain notice. He was one of a select few chosen to display his work in the First Biennial Exhibition of Contemporary American Paintings at the Virginia Museum of Fine Arts. The goal for the Museum was to "present an exhibition of living American art of notably high quality," said Thomas C. Colt, Jr., the Director of the Museum at the time. It was a significant achievement for the 26-year-old Robbins. The jury that selected Robbins' piece titled Rain for inclusion in the exhibit was chaired by the renowned Edward Hopper and consisted of such notable painters as John Carroll, Daniel Garber, Charles Hopkinson and Bernard Karfiol. Robbins also exhibited his work in 1938 at the Ogunquit Art Center in Ogunquit, Maine – a vibrant artist colony where both Hopper and Karfiol exhibited and spent significant time. By the mid-1940s, Robbins was teaching art at the Bristol Art Center in Bristol, Connecticut and exhibiting his work at the New Britain Museum of American Art in nearby New Britain.

In the 1950s and 1960s, Robbins' work was exhibited at the Raymond Burr Gallery in Beverly Hills, California, as well as at Naomi Marshall's Downtown Gallery in New Orleans, Louisiana, and Tom Caplinger's Gallery along Bourbon Street in the French Quarter, among others. He also worked and exhibited for many years at The Little Gallery in New Orleans.

Alberta Collier, the legendary art critic at The Times-Picayune newspaper for nearly 40 years, reviewed many of Robbins' exhibitions, calling the artist's works "well developed" with compositions that showcased "a search for new combinations." Collier noted the "individuality of the artist" and paid particular attention to Robbins' style of realism, writing in 1955, "Robbins demonstrates good craftsmanship and excellent control of his medium. His work is of the realist school popular with most people. However, he uses good color, intelligent elimination of detail, and rich pigment to lift his paintings above those that are merely attempts to copy nature."

== Influences ==
During his five decades as an artist, Robbins' paintings were heavily influenced by his surroundings, reflecting the two regions that he called home – Boston and New Orleans; with the latter being his main residence from the 1950s onward. The artist's New England roots are displayed in much of his work, and it's clear the coast held a special allure for Robbins, as evidenced by his many paintings of boats and seascapes. Yet, the French Quarter of New Orleans was his adopted home, and he captured the city and its culture in his later works, with rich depictions of street scenes under varying lighting effects that were noted by art critics like Collier. "Robbins runs the gamut in his handling of light," wrote Collier in 1956. "He can get the effect of bright sunlight in a painting like 'Swimming Hole' and can also capture the somber tones in such a piece as, 'End of the Rainbow.'"

== Personal life and death ==
Robbins never married, nor had children, dying alone in Louisiana on May 24, 1980. He is buried at the Masonic Cemetery in Rayville, Louisiana.
