= Henriette H. Lannes =

Henriette H. Lannes or Madame Lannes (12 November 1899, in Puyoô, France – 28 May 1980, in Paris) Pupil of G. I. Gurdjieff and teacher of Gurdjieff's system, mainly to English pupils in the Gurdjieff Foundation of Paris and London. She met Jeanne de Salzmann in 1938.

== Bibliography ==
Beatley, William and Betty Beatley: Inside a question - Works of Henriette Lannes - Pupil of G. I. Gurdjieff Paul H. Crompton Ltd, London 2002. ISBN 1-874250-56-1

Lannes, Henriette: This Fundamental Quest: The Journey of a Pupil of G. I. Gurdjieff Far West Institute, San Francisco 2006.
