= Hermann Flade =

German political scientist

- Born: Hermann Joseph Flade; 22 May 1932; Würzburg, Bavaria, Weimar Republic
- Died: 16 May 1980 (aged 47); Bonn, North Rhine-Westphalia, West Germany
- Occupations: Show trial victim Political Scientist
- Spouse: Y
- Children: 3

Hermann Flade (22 May 1932 – 16 May 1980) was a German political scientist.

Flade was born in Würzburg. At the age of 18, he was the victim of a show trial in Dresden in 1951 at which he was sentenced to death after he had been caught distributing sheets/pamphlets objecting to the undemocratic nature of the 1950 general election in the German Democratic Republic (GDR). The show trial and the court verdict resonated well beyond the borders of the GDR, attracting a level of publicity that ensured Flade a permanent place in the history of the regime. Flade's death sentence was later reduced to 15 years in prison.

== Life ==
=== Growing up ===
Hermann Flade was born in 1932 in Lower Franconia in the north-western part of Bavaria. In 1936 he moved with his mother and stepfather to a small industrial town called Olbernhau in the mining region of Saxony, near the border with Bohemia. He started his schooling there before the family moved some 80 km (50 miles) away to Dresden in 1942. Flade's parents instilled in him a strong commitment to Roman Catholicism.

In the year that Flade moved to Dreden, he joined the German Youth section of the Hitler Youth movement. Two years later, he resigned from the movement, which in the context of the times was a bold and unusual step for a twelve-year-old. In 1944 Flade progressed to secondary school. After February 1945, when Dresden was fire bombed, he and his mother returned to Olbernhau.

In October 1949, at his own instigation, he took a year out from school in order to work in the Soviet-controlled uranium mines nearby. This gave him first-hand experience with the appalling conditions in the mines and enabled him to provide financial support for his family. A year later, wishing to return to school in October 1950, he found himself enrolled in the Freie Deutsche Jugend (FDJ / Free German Youth), which was in effect the youth wing of the country's ruling Sozialistische Einheitspartei Deutschlands (SED / Socialist Unity Party of Germany). During this time Flade also became friendly with the priest Arthur Lange, a refugee from Silesia who would come to exercise significant influence over him.

=== Leafleting ===
The German Democratic Republic was a young country, officially established only in October 1949, even though by that time the basis for its one-party political structure had in effect already been created more than three years earlier, when the region was under a more direct form of Soviet administration, with the creation, in April 1946, of the ruling SED (party). On 15 October 1950 the young country held its first general election for membership of the Volkskammer (People's Chamber), which was to be the national legislature under the country's constitutional arrangements. Simultaneous elections were also held for the Landtagen (Regional assemblies) and local government bodies. In conventional psephological terms the elections were not free. Also they were also not free in terms of the country's constitution which had been proclaimed on 7 October 1949 (and which would be extensively modified only after the 1950 general election). There was a single list of candidates and voters simply took the ballot paper and dropped it into the ballot box to vote for the candidate. Any voter prepared to vote against the candidate simply took the ballot paper and dropped it into a different box, without any secrecy. According to official figures, the ruling party's "National Front" list received the approval of 99.6% of voters, with turnout reported at 98.5%.

Flade was not supportive of this undemocratic election process. Using a toy printing set the 18-year-old produced 186 flysheets protesting against the election. One version denounced the "election fraud" while another, titled "The Goose", was a satirical composition concerning the massive reparations having to be delivered to the Soviet Union and the dire condition of the German Democratic Republic: "The goose waddles like [President] Pieck, croaks like [Prime Minister] Grotewohl and is plucked like the German people" Between 10 and 14 October 1950, Hermann Fade pasted his flysheets on houses, walls and lampposts. During the evening of 14 October, he was surprised by a plain clothes policeman. Flade fled after resisting arrest using a pocket knife with which he cut the upper arm and the back of the plainclothes man, who was thereby lightly injured. Following an extensive search, on 16 October 1950, Fade was arrested and taken into investigative custody.

=== Trial ===
==== The hearing ====
Frade's trial opened before the Dresden regional court on 8 January 1951. The trial was organised and choreographed as a political show trial by the ruling SED (party). It was held not in a courtroom but in the "Tivoli Restaurant" in Olbernhau, the defendant's home town. The unconventional trial venue was able to accommodate more people than any other in the town. The "court room" was full, the organisers having obliged approximately, 1,200 party workers and members to attend. The trial proceedings were transmitted on the local radio station. Flade was accused of attempted murder. Sources agree that he attempted to resist arrest and, in a scuffle, cut the plainclothes policeman who surprised him on 14 October with a pocket knife. The court was told he had attempted to murder the policeman with a cutlass-style hunting knife.

One person whose responses had not been choreographed by the trial organisers was the defendant. To the evident chagrin of the court, he did not deny the facts, but justified his behaviour: "I said to myself, in an election you need [the chance to hear] more than one voice. Since I was not able to provide that myself openly, because I would have been thrown out of school if I had, I had to do it at night in secret." ("Ich sagte mir, bei einer Wahl müsste auch eine andere Stimme gehört werde. Da ich das nicht offen machen konnte, weil ich sonst von der Schule fliegen würde, musste ich das nachts im Geheimen tun.") Nor was there anything choreographed or staged about Flade's hysterical cry, "I love freedom!" ("Ich liebe die Freiheit") which those present along with the radio listeners heard as the hearing reached its climax. Olbernhau was a town of some 10,000 people and the mining industry fostered close relationships between the families involved in it. Flade won the sympathy of many listeners because he had not been afraid to denounce the conditions in the uranium mines when he worked in them during his year taken out from school. His protests against the anti-democratic conduct of the 1950 election, already widely known locally, gained wider publicity because of the coverage given to the trial.

==== Sentencing ====
After a hearing that lasted for two days, on 10 January 1951, the court pronounced sentence. Hermann Flade was sentenced to death for

"Campaigning for the boycott of democratic institutions and coordinating with propagandists for militarism, attempted murder and resisting arresting officers".
("... Boykotthetze gegen demokratische Einrichtungen und Organisationen in Tateinheit mit Betreibens militaristischer Propaganda, versuchten Mordes und Widerstand gegen Vollstreckungsbeamte“)

The death sentence was greeted with widespread horror. In the town of Olbernhau one radio listener recalled later how her mother broke down, shaking and sobbing that the death sentence was too much. The families of the listener and of Flade were not close, but they would have greeted each other in the street, and the show trial had been massively publicised.

Internationally protests came from the CDU veteran, Ernst Lemmer and the mayor of West Berlin, Ernst Reuter, along with the recently elected West German chancellor, Konrad Adenauer, who characterized the court decision as an "act of terrorism" ("terroristische Handlung"). Within the German Democratic Republic, there was a proliferation of slogans on walls. High school students at Werdau staged a particularly well remembered protest and were rewarded later in the year with their own show trial, culminating with lengthy prison sentences.

==== Sentence commuted ====
In view of the reactions provoked, The Party now pushed for the sentence to be commuted. A date for an appeal hearing at the Dresden district court had already been set, although Flade's defense counsel was not permitted to submit the grounds for the appeal until less than 24 hours before the hearing, which took place on 29 January 1951. The Dresden court upheld the guilty verdict of the lower court and they rejected Flade's annulment application. But they commuted the sentence to a fifteen year jail term.

=== Prison ===
Hermann Flade remained in prison till 1960, being held in solitary confinement till 18 May 1954. He was held successively in the prisons at Bautzen, Torgau and Waldheim: it was in Torgau that he contracted Tuberculosis.

His parents had fled to the west immediately following his trial and conviction. Flade turned down an offer from the Stasi that he might be released if he could persuade his parents to return to the German Democratic Republic. After his solitary confinement was relaxed, he made contact with a fellow prisoner who was a mathematics professor, with whom Flade began to work on his own mathematical skills.

On 5 February 1958, Flade agreed to become an Informal collaborator (IM) for the Stasi, thinking that he might receive his freedom in return, but the Stasi mistrusted his motives and cancelled his IM status. It was only at the start of November 1960 that Flade was released, following an Amnesty.

=== Life after release from prison ===
Directly after his release, Flade moved to Greiz, but just a few weeks later, before the end of 1960, he had managed to cross into West Germany to join his parents in Traunstein. He was greeted on his arrival at the main station at Hof (on the West German side of the inner German border), only to be removed to an undisclosed location by a reporter from the Hamburg based Magazine Stern. As a rival publication noted, he was then kept in "quarantine" by Stern until he had given his exclusive story to their reporter, also known as the novelist Eva Müthel (1932-1980), herself a former inmate of East German jails. In return, however, the magazine provided much needed financial support for the postponed conclusion of his schooling and further studies. Hermann Flade was 28 by the time he was able to complete his schooling, and he lost little time in passing his final school exams, some ten years later than would have been anticipated before the trial.

Published output

- Deutsche gegen Deutsche – Erlebnisbericht aus dem sowjetzonalen Zuchthaus, Edition: Herder Freiburg, 1963. Taschenbuch (pocketbook/paperback) 284 pages

In 1963 he published a memoir of his time in prison entitled "Germans against Germans - A report of experience from the Soviet-zone prison" ("Deutsche gegen Deutsche – Erlebnisbericht aus dem sowjetzonalen Zuchthaus") News of the book's publication reached the inmates and the guards at the Waldheim prison back in the German Democratic Republic. A former inmate later recalled that the prison guards were outraged, but the prisoners reacted with deep satisfaction to the knowledge that conditions in the East German prisons had been described from personal experience to a western readership.

On finishing school, he studied political Science and philosophy at Munich and Mainz, gaining his doctorate in 1967 with a dissertation on political theory. He tried to obtain a job with the "inner leadership" of the West German army, but his application was rejected in case he might constitute a security risk. On 1 April 1968 he took a job as a research assistant with the "Association for German Reunification", and in 1969 he joined the deutsches Institut (Whole Germany Institute) in Bonn.

He was in Bonn when he died suddenly, a few days before his 48th birthday. Sources attribute his early death to the torture inflicted on him and the tuberculosis he acquired during his ten years in East German prisons.
