= Pierre Marchand (fencer) =

French fencer

Personal information
- Born: 11 November 1948
- Died: 8 May 1980 (aged 31)

Sport
- Sport: Fencing

Pierre Marchand (11 November 1948 – 8 May 1980) was a French fencer. He competed in the team épée event at the 1972 Summer Olympics.
