= Mayilai Seeni. Venkatasami =

Tamil scholar

Venkatasami
- Born: Mayilai Seeni Venkatasami; 16 December 1900; Madras, Madras Presidency, British India (now Chennai, Tamil Nadu, India)
- Died: 8 May 1980 (aged 79)
- Occupations: writer, scholar

Mayilai Seeni. Venkatasami (16 December 1900 – 8 May 1980) was a Tamil researcher, scholar, historian and writer from Tamil Nadu, India.

== Biography ==
Seeni. Venkatasami was born in Mylapore, Chennai. His father was a Siddha medicine practitioner. He had two elder brothers. The eldest brother was a Siddha doctor like their father. The second brother Seeni. Govindarajan was a Tamil scholar. He has written literary works like Thirukkural Kamathuppaal Naatkal and Thirumayilai Naanmani Kadigai. Venkatasamy initially learnt Tamil from Govindarajan and later from Mahavidwan Shanmugam Pillai and Pandit Sargunar. He joined the editorial team of the Justice Party magazine Dravidan. He was interested in art and studied for some time in Egmore Arts School. To support his family financially he joined Santhome corporation school as a teacher. During his vacation days he traveled to places of worship and places of historical importance all over Tamil Nadu and conducted field research in archaeology, epigraphy and numismatics. He learnt all South Indian writing systems like Brahmi, Grantha and Tamil. He also knew Kannada and Malayalam. He researched Jain and Buddhist archaeological places of interest which had been largely ignored by the Hindu historians. He served as the president of the Chennai Writers Association twice.

In 2000, the Government of Tamil Nadu nationalised his writings.

== Bibliography ==
- Kirithuvamum Tamilum
- Bouthamum Tamilum
- Samanamum Tamilum
- Mahabalipurathu Jaina Sirpam
- Irayanar Kalaviyal
- Boutha Kadhaigal
- Iraivan Aadiya Ezhuvagai Thaandavangal
- Magendiravarman
- Narasimmavarman
- Moondram Nandivarman
- Buddha Jathaka Kadaigal
- Anjiraithumbi
- Gowthama Budhar
- Maraindhu pona Tamil noolgal
- Saasanach seyyum Manjari
- Manonmaneeya Araychiyum Urayum
- Pazhangalath Thamizh Vaanigam
- Kongu Naatu Varalaaru
- Kalappirar Aatchiyil Tamilagam
- Isaivaanar Kadhaigal
- Unavu Nool
- Tuluva Naatu Varalaaru - Link to Book 1, 2
- Samayangal Valartha Tamil
- Sangakaalath Tamilaga Varalaaril sila seidhigal
- Cheran Chenguttuvan
- Pathanbadhaam Noorrandu Tamil ilakkiyam
- Sanga Kaalach Chera Chola Paandiyar
- Sanga Kaalathu Bramik kalvettuzhuthukkal
- Nun Kalaigal
- Tamilar Valartha Alagu Kalaigal
- Sirupaanan Sendra Peruvazhi
- Mahendiravarman Iyarriya Mathavilaasam
- Palanthamizhum Palvagai samayamum
