= Roseland (band) =

US musical project

- Also known as: Tyler Bates & Azam Ali; Roseland featuring Tyler Bates and Azam Ali
- Origin: Los Angeles, US; Iran
- Genres: Rock; ambient; darkwave
- Years active: 2003–2007
- Labels: Tyzami Records
- Past members: Azam Ali; Tyler Bates

Roseland was a musical partnership between Iranian musician Azam Ali and American film composer Tyler Bates, active between 2003 and 2007. They released one album, the self-titled Roseland, in 2007.

== History and Roseland ==
The two first met in 2001, when Ali performed on Bates's score for the film Night at the Golden Eagle. They subsequently began working on material together, which would eventually lead to the Roseland project. In 2007, Ali sang on the soundtrack to the film 300, which Bates scored.

Roseland released a self-titled album in 2007, with Bates playing keyboards and electric, acoustic, and bass guitars, as well as arrangements and programming, and Ali singing and playing the santur. The album also featured Ali's Vas bandmate Greg Ellis playing drums and percussion.

== Reception ==
Roseland was noted for straying from both artists' general work, with Ali singing in a rock vocal style and Bates exploring ambient electronic techniques. The lyrics were noted for their haunting and evocative reflections on the sorrows of war, self-doubt, and personal experiences and relationships.

Roseland

Studio album by Roseland
- Released: August 7, 2007
- Genre: Darkwave; rock
- Length: 50:40
- Label: Tyzami Records
- Producer: Tyler Bates

== Roseland track listing ==
No.	Title	Length
1.	"Other Side of Me"	3:27
2.	"The Spill"	5:21
3.	"Mothwings"	4:23
4.	"Hollow Feel"	4:53
5.	"Keep It Coming"	5:08
6.	"Forty One Ways"	5:38
7.	"Bitter Days"	4:47
8.	"The Reaper's Crown"	5:21
9.	"Believer"	6:54
10.	"Light the Stars"	4:48
Total length:		50:40
