= Habib Meftah Boushehri =

Habib Meftah حبیب مفتاح
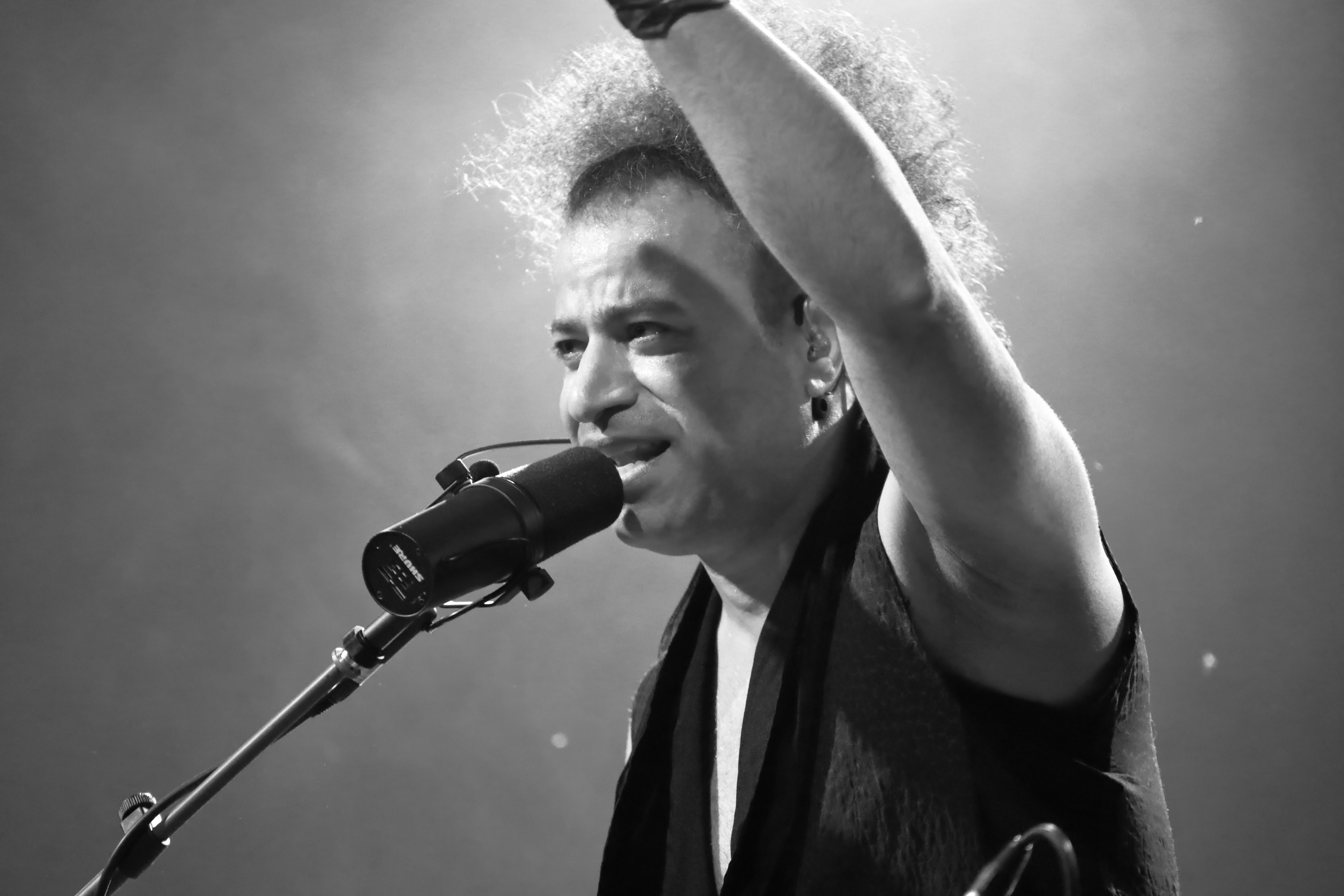
- Habib Meftah at Rudolstadt-Festival 2019

Background information
- Birth name: Habib Meftah Boushehri
- Born: 10 February 1978 (age 47)
- Origin: Bushehr, Iran
- Genres: Contemporary, jazz
- Instrument(s): Percussion, flute, vocal
- Years active: 2001–present
- Labels: United Voice Avakhorshid, Ohrwurm
- Website: https://habibmeftah.com/

Habib Meftah Boushehri (Persian: حبیب مفتاح بوشهری) (Born: 10 February 1978) known professionally as Habib Meftah (a.k.a. Habiboo), is an Iranian Percussionist, singer and composer. This self-taught sound artist was born in Boushehr and currently resides in Paris. Habib Meftah is one of the most well-known Iranian percussionists world-wide, who has collaborated for years with numerous artists around the world such as Le Trio Joubran, Adnan Joubran, and Titi Robin, Azam Ali (Niyaz), etc. At the age of 10 he had already started playing traditional flutes and then he started playing percussion instruments. His versatility is based on the traditional musical culture of his southern Iranian origins. He debuted as a solo artist in 2005 with the album 'Deyzangeroo'. Habib Meftah released his 2nd solo album 'Shibaali' on 22 November 2020.

== Early life ==
Habib Meftah was born in Boushehr, a southern port in Iran. At the age of 10 he started to learn flute by himself and then was guided by his father. He studied Architecture at high school. At the age of 23 he went to Paris following the invitation of French dance company 'Montalvo-Hervieu'.

== Career ==
At the age of 16 Habib Meftah along with Mohsen Sharifian established 'Lian' musical group. At his 22, he started a collaboration with the Shanbezadeh Ensemble, in which together they were invited to play at several international festivals such as Romaeuropa Festival. In 2001 he was invited to play with the French dance company Montalvo-Hervieu, touring the world yet again. Always looking for new inspiration, he moved to Iran (2005) and debuted as a solo artist with the album 'Deyzangeroo' and worked with many different Iranian fusion artists such as Manushan, Peter Soleimanipour and Darkoob. On 2008 he went back to Paris continuing his work with renowned musicians such as Le Trio Joubran, Adnan Joubran, Titi Robin, Azam Ali (Niyaz), Trio Azarin, Rumi Ensemble, Impure Dance Company, etc. In 2017, Habib Meftah sheds light on the essence of his atypical journey through his new project, Native. A dance-oriented electro-folk show that links traditional Iranian music with the dynamics of today's music scene and uses electronic music, looping, video projection and light automation. Currently he's working as duo with Nicolas Lacoummette as sound designer, and Zak Cammoun is their sound engineer. Mohsen Namjoo, Ali Azimi, and Shahin Najafi are among other Persian artists he has worked with through years.

=== Shibaali – Project and Album (2015–2020) ===
"Shibaali" as Habib Meftah himself says, is the musical diary of his life. He started working on the project since 2015, holding several tour concerts with the same name while working on the project. Eventually the album was released on 22 November 2020. 'Shibaali' was recorded in his personal studio 'Hejleh'.

"Itʹs a kind of musical diary of my life. Iʹve worked with impressions from my childhood and youth and my adulthood. For example, when I came home from school at noon, as a child, my grandmother would often surprise me with a little present, a coin or a sweet. These things were always hidden under a thin white scarf, which older women in southern Iran still use to cover themselves. And "Shibaali", the title of the project, means "underneath the clothing" in our language. The idea is to produce lots of little surprises for the audience as the concert goes on – just like my grandmother did in our garden". Habib Meftah

The official music video 'Salmaan' from the album 'Shibaali' is produced by United Voice

== Style and influence ==
The foundation of his work is traditional southern Iranian music from Abadan, Bandar Abbas, Boushehr and other places. He like to put it in contemporary clothing so that people who arenʹt normally interested in traditional sounds listen to it. He simply play folk music with its sound adapted to the present day. On having a master to learn instruments Habib Meftah calls his music "all hand-made" and asserts:

"That kind of thing wasnʹt usual where Iʹm from. I drank music in through my heart, as they say. I just listened to and watched the older men playing – and didnʹt ask anything". Habib Meftah

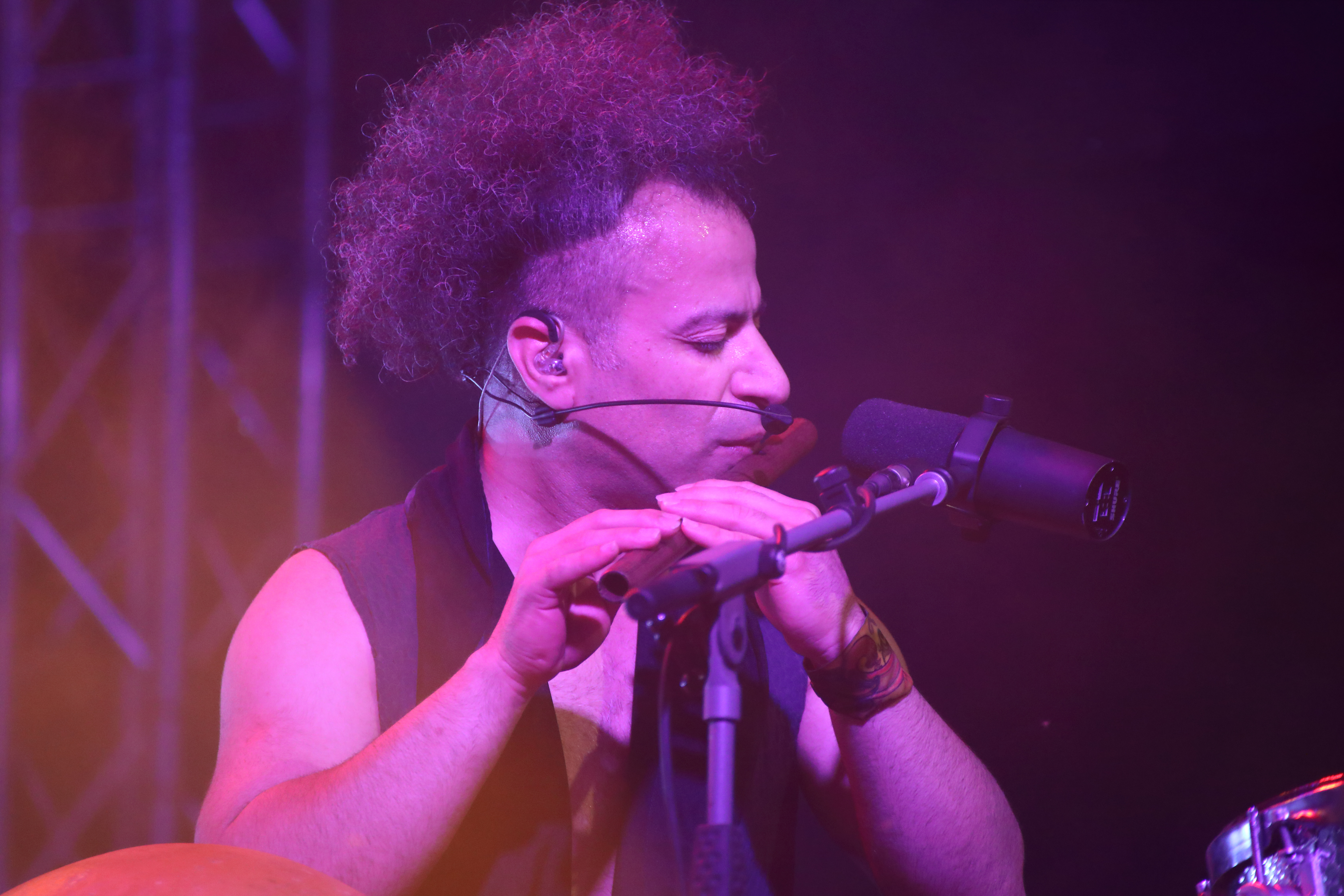
Habib Meftah at Rudolstadt-Festival 2019

== Innovations ==
Dom Dom is Habib Meftah's innovative instrument which is an instrument almost like Dammam but with only one side covered.

== Performances ==
The most renowned venues Habib has performed at are:

- Théâtre de la Ville (Paris)
- Théâtre national de Chaillot (Paris) – Louvre Museum (Paris)
- New Morning (Paris)
- Alhambra (Paris)
- Theater Antique (Lyon)
- Barbican Centre (London)
- El Rey Theatre (Los Angeles)
- Carnegie Hall (New York City)

== Discography ==
=== Singles ===
Year	Title	Lyrics	Music	length
2018	Hapa Root	Folklore	Habib Meftah	04:22
2019	Belam (feat. Shahin Najafi)	Rumi, Shahin Najafi	Habib Meftah	03:21
2020	Naliyeh (with. Mohsen Sharifian)	Folklore	Habib Meftah	03:03
2020	Falfali (with. Pouya Mahmoodi)	Mohammad Laryan	Habib Meftah	03:40
2021	LÂ (with. Mohsen Sharifian)		Habib Meftah, Mohsen Sharifian	03:43

=== 'Deyzangeroo' (2005) ===
No.	Title	Lyrics	Music	Length
1.	"Dammam (Bushehri Rhythmic Song)"		Habib Meftah	02:04
2.	"Deyzangeroo (An old Bushehri Myth about Eclipse)"		Habib Meftah	03:49
3.	"Choopee (Joyous Bushehri Rhythmic Song)"		Habib Meftah	03:28
4.	"Lalaee (Bushehri Song)"	Folklore	Habib Meftah	03:57
5.	"Yazaleh (Protesting Song)"		Habib Meftah	04:35
6.	"Mouloodi (Bushehri Rhythmic Song)"		Habib Meftah	04:33
7.	"Gallafi (Labour Music Concerning Boat Building)"		Habib Meftah	03:36
8.	"Neymeh (Labour Music Concerning Work on Boat)"	Folklore	Habib Meftah	05:57
9.	"Seleyga (Labour Song)"		Habib Meftah	04:24
10.	"Yazleh 2"		Habib Meftah	04:11
Total length:				40:40

=== 'Shibaali' (2020) ===
No.	Title	Lyrics	Music	Length
1.	"Ekwaan"		Habib Meftah	03:28
2.	"Modj"	Folklore	Habib Meftah	04:13
3.	"Kilil"	Folklore	Habib Meftah	03:33
4.	"Khelaas"	Folklore	Habib Meftah	03:19
5.	"Salmaan"	Folklore	Habib Meftah	03:47
6.	"Yedaaneh"	Folklore	Habib Meftah	04:33
7.	"Shibaali"		Habib Meftah	03:30
Total length:				26:26

=== 'Unbalanced' (2021) ===
No.	Title	Lyrics	Music	Length
1.	"Unbalanced"	Mohammad Laryan	Habib Meftah	03:26
2.	"Balanced"	Mohammad Laryan	Habib Meftah	02:55
3.	"Landed"	Mohammad Laryan	Habib Meftah	03:33
Total length:				09:55

== Filmography ==
"It Was 5 in the Morning" by Mostafa Heravi (2018)
