= Pacifika =

Canadian world music band

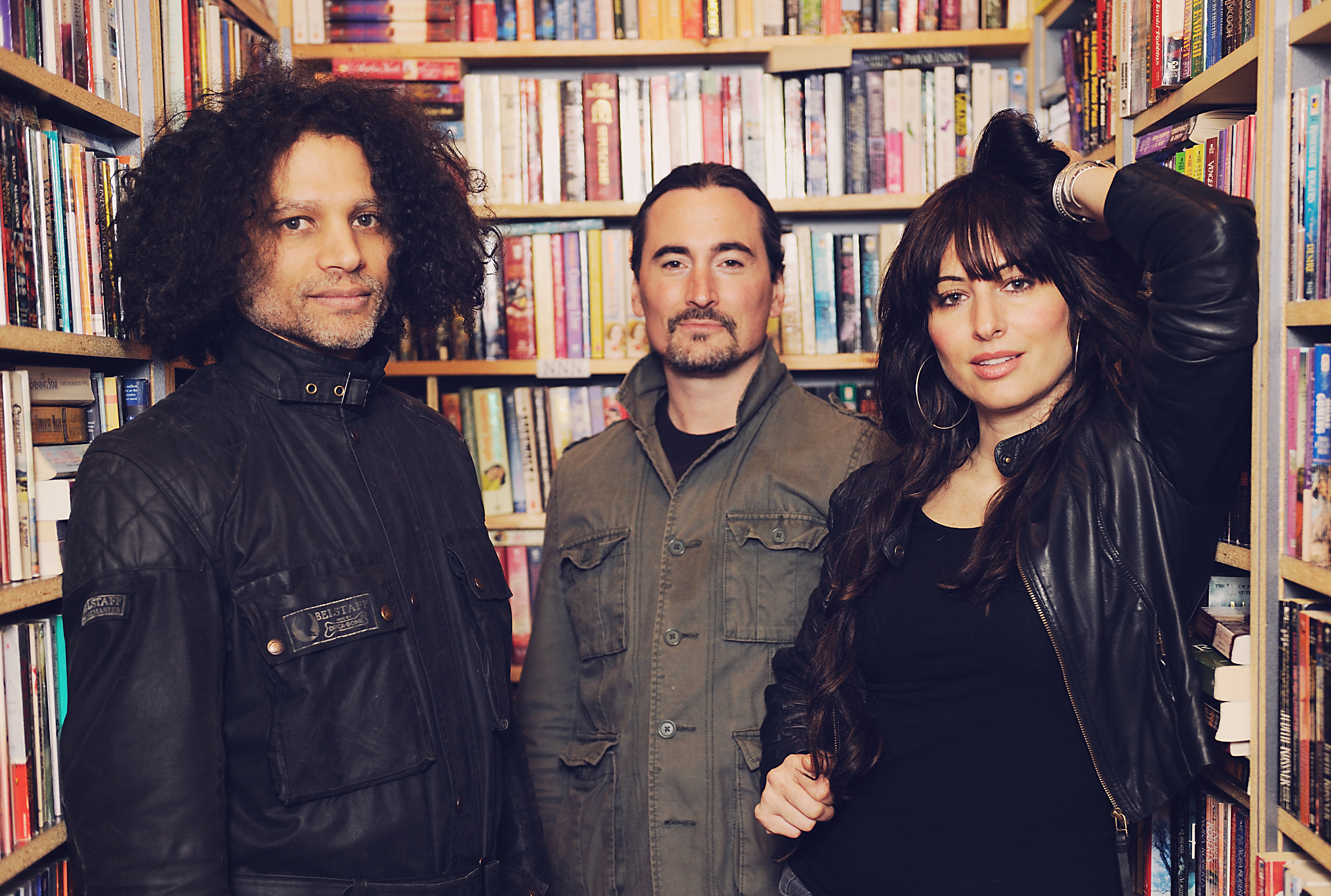
- Pacifika in 2014

Background information
- Origin: Vancouver, British Columbia, Canada
- Genres: World music
- Years active: 2004–present
- Labels: Six Degrees; Universal Motown
- Members: Silvana Kane; Adam Popowitz; Toby Peter

Pacifika is a Canadian world music band formed in Vancouver, British Columbia by high school friends Silvana Kane (vocals) and Adam Popowitz (guitar) in 2004 and joined by Toby Peter (bass and drums) in 2006. According to Kane, who sings in Spanish, English, and French, Pacifika "is simply the Latin way of saying 'peaceful' in the feminine, except that we changed the 'c' to a 'k'". The group has released four albums: their independent debut, Unveiled (2004), and three with Six Degrees Records: Asunción (2008), Supermagique (2010), and Amor Planeta (2014).

== Background ==
Peruvian-Canadian Silvana Kane met Adam Popowitz while they were both attending Catholic high school in Burnaby, BC. They subsequently formed the band Big Bottom Swing. Kane left the band to join the pop trio West End Girls, signed a record deal with A&M Records, and had a top ten Canadian hit with "Not Like Kissing You" in 1991. Popowitz helped form the Vancouver hard rock band Mollies Revenge, signed a record deal with Atlantic Records via David Foster's imprint 143 Records, and released the Rick Parashar-produced Every Dirty Word in 1997. Popowitz and Mollies Revenge leader Yvette Narlock then formed Yve Adam and released the Carmen Rizzo-produced Fiction in 2000. Peter formed the fusion band Salvador Dream, signed a record deal with Warner, and released UR in 1994. In 2004, K-os enlisted Peter for the touring band on his Joyful Rebellion world tour. In the same year, Kane and Popowitz reconnected, then wrote and released Unveiled. After seeing a live performance in 2006, Peter approached Kane and Popowitz about joining the band. Now a trio, and with funding secured with a FACTOR album loan, they wrote and recorded Asunción, which they then successfully shopped to Six Degrees Records.

== History ==
=== Unveiled (2004) ===
Unveiled was released independently in 2004 under the band's original spelling, "Pacifica". The album was re-released in 2011 with the current spelling. The eleventh track, "Save the Day", was featured on the Syfy series Being Human, in the episode "Children Shouldn't Play with Undead Things", and in the Space series Charlie Jade, in the episode "Bedtime Story".

=== Asunción (2008) ===
Asunción was released by Six Degrees Records and Universal Motown in April 2008. It reached the peak position on the iTunes Latino Album chart, was named Best Album of 2008 by NPR, and got on the Amazon "2008 Editor Picks". Pacifika has been praised by The Wall Street Journal, New York Post, and KCRW. KCRW picked the band to perform at the Hollywood Bowl at their 2008 World Festival, alongside Feist and Sharon Jones & The Dap-Kings. The second track from Asunción, "Me Cai", was featured on the HBO series True Blood, in the episode "Scratches" (season two). The USA Network used the tracks "Libertad", "Sol", and "Paloma" for their series Covert Affairs. The Asunción album tour included headlining spots at the Montreal Jazz Festival, Bumbershoot, Winnipeg Folk Festival, Vancouver Folk Music Festival, Calgary Folk Music Festival, and Sunfest in London, Ontario. Radio-Canada picked the band for their "Révélations 2008" roster, alongside Coeur de Pirate and Caracol.

=== Supermagique (2010) ===
Supermagique was released in August 2010 by Six Degrees. iTunes named the record "Best World Album" of 2010, and it was nominated for "World Recording of the Year" at the 2011 Juno Awards. The album contains a cover of the song "25 or 6 to 4", originally recorded by Chicago in 1970, and it was featured in the pilot episode of The CW show Ringer.

=== Amor Planeta (2014) ===
Amor Planeta was released on May 6, 2014, by Six Degrees Records.

== Solo projects ==
Silvana Kane released her debut solo album, La Jardinera, in 2012, under Six Degrees Records. The album pays tribute to the South American musical heroes of her youth.

== Band members ==
- Silvana Kane – vocals
- Adam Popowitz – guitar
- Toby Peter – bass, drums

== Discography ==
- Unveiled (2004)
- Asunción (2008)
- Supermagique (2010)
- Amor Planeta (2014)
