= Niyaz =

Iranian-Canadian musical duo

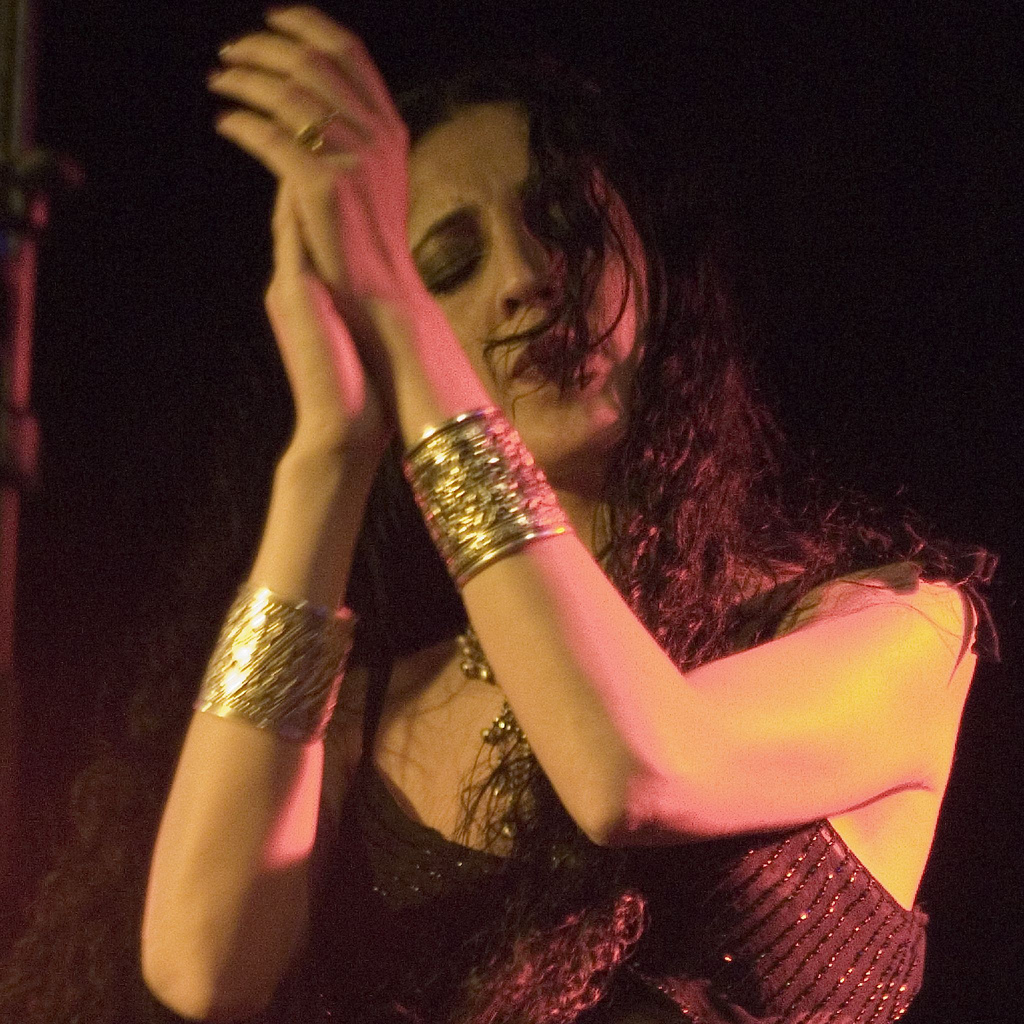
- Azam Ali performing with Niyaz in 2007

Background information
- Origin: Los Angeles, United States; Montreal, Canada; Iran
- Genres: World music; folk; electronica; Sufi music
- Years active: 2005–present
- Label: Six Degrees
- Members: Azam Ali; Loga Ramin Torkian; Habib Meftah Bouchehri
- Past members: Carmen Rizzo
- Website: niyazmusic.com

Niyaz (Persian: نياز) is an Iranian Canadian musical duo. The group was created in 2004 by DJ, programmer/producer and remixer Carmen Rizzo, vocalist and hammered dulcimer player Azam Ali, formerly of the group Vas, and Ali's husband, Loga Ramin Torkian, of the Iranian crossover group Axiom Of Choice. In 2013, Carmen Rizzo announced via Facebook that he was retiring from Niyaz. "Niyaz" means "yearning" in Persian.

Niyaz's music, described as "mystical music with a modern edge", is primarily a blend of Sufi mysticism and trance electronica. Niyaz adapts Persian, Indian and Mediterranean folk sounds, poetry and songs including the poetry of Sufi mystic Rumi, with Western electronic instrumentation and programming.

Their self-titled debut album, released in 2005, combined 13th century Sufi and Urdu poetry with "swirling, hypnotic beats". Their 2008 follow-up album, Nine Heavens, featured two discs; the second disc contained acoustic renditions of the tracks on the first disc.

Their third album, Sumud (صمود), released in spring 2012. A companion piece to the album, an acoustic EP with six songs, was released March 19, 2013.

== Lyrical sources ==
Though they have several songs with original lyrics, the bulk of their lyrics are derived from Persian and Urdu Sufi poetry by the likes of Rumi, Obeyd-e Zakani, Amir Khusrow and Khaju-ye Kermani, and folk songs from Iran, Afghanistan, Pakistan and other parts of the Middle East and central Asia.

The lyrics of their first two albums are almost exclusively in Persian and Urdu, with the exception of a Turkish song on Nine Heavens, but their third album, Sumud featured mostly Persian songs with two songs in Turkish and one each in Palestinian Arabic and the Kurmanji dialect of Kurdish.

== Discography ==
- Niyaz (2005)
- Nine Heavens (2008)
- Sumud (2012)
- Sumud Acoustic EP (2013)
- The Fourth Light (2015)
