= Nine Heavens =

Studio album by Niyaz
- Released: June 24, 2008 (U.S.)
- Genre: Dance, Electronica, World
- Label: Six Degrees
- Producer: Azam Ali, Loga Ramin Torkian and Carmen Rizzo

Niyaz chronology
Niyaz (2005)	Nine Heavens (2008)	Sumud (2012)

Professional ratings
Review scores
Source	Rating
Allmusic	4/5 stars

Nine Heavens (Persian: نه بهشت, Noh behešt) is the second album of Iranian music group Niyaz, an acoustic electronic project. It was released on June 24, 2008 on Six Degrees Records.

The album is divided into 2 discs. One is the electronic version of the album, while the second disc presents eight of the songs as acoustic versions with the exception of "Iman", which is mostly an electronic/ambient piece and features no acoustic instruments but includes Azam Ali's vocals. Many of the track titles were revealed on site of the band's label.

Nine Heavens reached #4 in the Billboard Top World Albums chart.

== Track listing ==
=== Disc 1 ===
1. "Beni Beni"
2. "Tamana"
3. "Feraghi - Song Of Exile"
4. "Ishq - Love And The Veil"
5. "Allah Mazare"
6. "Iman"
7. "Molk-E-Divan"
8. "Hejran"
9. "Sadrang"

=== Disc 2 ===
1. "Allah Mazare" (acoustic)
2. "Beni Beni" (acoustic)
3. "Sadrang" (acoustic)
4. "Tamana" (acoustic)
5. "Feraghi - Song Of Exile" (acoustic)
6. "Hejran" (acoustic)
7. "Ishq - Love And The Veil" (acoustic)
8. "Molk-E-Divan" (acoustic)

== Lyrical sources ==
"Beni beni" is based on an 18th-century Turkish Sufi folk song.

"Ishq" and "Tamana" are based on ghazal by Khwaja Mir Dard.

The words to "Iman" are drawn from two ruba'iyat by different authors: Mirza Salamat Ali Dabir and Maulana Altaf Hussain Hali.

"Molk-e-Divan" is based on the ghazal Khiz tâ bâde dar pyâle konim by Sufi poet Khâju-ye Kermâni (خواجوی کرمانی) with a few alterations , and "Sadrang" draws the lyrics from works by Amir Khusrow (امیر خسرو دهلوی), a 13th-century mystic and poet who, like Niyaz's vocalist Azam Ali, was a Persian raised in India.

== In other media ==
The songs of "Nine Heavens" were played in several episodes of HBO's television series True Blood.

The song "Beni, Beni" was played in episode 7 of ABC's television series Missing (2012).
