= Portals of Grace =

Studio album by Azam Ali
- Released: July 30, 2002
- Genre: Folk; Folk-pop; World
- Label: Narada Productions
- Producer: Azam Ali

Azam Ali chronology
Portals of Grace (2002)	Elysium for the Brave (2006)

Portals of Grace is the first solo release from Azam Ali. Prior to this album, she had released music with the group VAS.

Ali called the album her "thesis [in many ways] because I sang in an early music choir, studied early music, and there was no place for that in Vas or Niyaz."

== Reception ==
Philip Van Vleck, of The Herald-Sun named it one of his top albums of 2002.

== Track listing ==
1. Lasse Pour Quoi (Anon. early 14th century, Middle French) - 6:21
2. La Serena (Sephardic, Judeo-Spanish) - 4:31
3. Breton Medley (instrumental, Brittany) - 3:57
4. O Felix (Anima) (12th century, Latin) - 5:18
5. Ben Pode Santa Maria (13th century, Galician-Portuguese) - 3:08
6. O Quanta Qualia (12th century, Latin) - 3:59
7. Sackpipslät (instrumental, Sweden) - 2:40
8. Ai Ondas (Early 14th century, Galician-Portuguese) - 5:12
9. A Chantar M'er (Late 12th century, Old French) - 6:31
10. Inna-I-Malak (Byzantine, Arabic) - 5:23
11. El Rey De Francia (Sephardic, Judeo-Spanish) - 4:31
