= Sumud (album) =

Studio album by Niyaz
- Released: 2012
- Genre: Dance, Electronica, World
- Label: Six Degrees
- Producer: Azam Ali, Loga Ramin Torkian and Carmen Rizzo

Niyaz chronology
Nine Heavens (2008)	Sumud (2012)	Sumud Acoustic EP (2013)

Sumud (صمود), which was released on 22 May 2012, is the third album by Niyaz. It was originally reported that like their previous album Nine Heavens it would be released as a double album with one disc each for acoustic versions and electronic versions of songs, though it was released as a normal record with ten songs. The album features the guest appearance of A.R. Rahman on the song Mazaar, a traditional Afghan folk song.

The album's lyrics are mostly in Persian (Parishaan, Shah Sanam, Mazaar, Rah-e-Vafa, Masooz and Mahtaab) with two songs in Turkish (Dertli and Arzusun) and features the band's first lyrics in Arabic (Rayat Al Sumud) and Kurdish (Sosin). It is their first album to feature no Urdu songs.

== Track listing ==
1. "Parishaan"
2. "Sosin"
3. "Shah Sanam"
4. "Mazaar ft. A R Rahman"
5. "Rah-e-Vafa"
6. "Dertli"
7. "Masooz"
8. "Rayat al Sumud"
9. "Mahtaab"
10. "Arzusun"

=== Lyrical sources ===
The words to "Parishaan" are based on various poetry by Baba-Taher (باباطاهر), an 11th-century Sufi mystic.

Several songs are folk songs, some of which have been performed by other artists whose renditions can be found online. "Sosin" was performed by Kurdish singer Hesen Cizîrî (Hesenê Cizrawî), "Masooz" by Qanbar Raastgu (قنبر راستگو). Versions of "Shah Sanam" (shortened from Shâh Sanam Zibâ Sanam (شاه صنم زیبا صنم)) by Navaye Qariyeh, Simâ Binâ (سیما بینا) and Amânj Azarmi (امانج ازرمی) can be found online. "Dertli" is a folk song from the Bolu region of Turkey.

"Mazaar," which features guest vocals by A.R. Rahman, is based on Sar-e Kuh-e Boland (سر کوه بلند), a Herati Afghan poem.

"Arzusun" is based on a poem by Alevi-Bektashi poet Kul Nesîmî that was later made into a song by Turkish folk artist Muharrem Temiz.
