= Everest Records Switzerland =

Everest Records is a music label based in Bern, Switzerland which produces electronica, drone music, IDM, electro-acoustic and experimental music. Founded in 1999 by Matthias Hügli and Michael Meienberg, the label's first release was Meienberg’s own EP Holy Mud..

On the label's 10th anniversary, Swiss culture magazine Ensuite Kulturmagazin published an account of Everest Records' history to date. The German newspaper Der Bund also published a 10th anniversary piece by music journalist Ane Hebeisen which includes highlights from the label's early years and notes the importance of the label in continuing an alternative music culture. Hebeisen describes one Everest Records release, ElevatorMusic, as a "sinister-bruitistische sound collage full of threatening atmospheres". Five years later, Hebeisen - who is the electronic artist for Da Cruz, and was previously the vocalist for Swamp Terrorists - authored another piece about the label, again published in Der Bund: an interview with Hügli and Meienberg to mark 15 years of musical output

In 2012 Everest Records released a vinyl production of the music and photographic journal of drummer Julian Sartorius, which the Swiss daily newspaper Neue Zürcher Zeitung reviewed in detail. The following is an extract from that review, translated from German into English:

"From black-and-white winter landscapes, a kaleidoscopic sky emerges; suddenly a storm comes up, and then there are only square-colored snippets, a touch of confetti. And in addition the acoustic counterpart: cowbell bells, a synthi rattles, in the distance a bird chirping - a halfway idyllic sound scenery; then it changes, the groove stumbles, becomes wilder and more complicated".

Bern magazine KultuRadar has featured Everest Records as a contributor to the cultural life of the city; and in an interview with Red Bull, we learn that Hügli and Meienberg have, at times, signed artists based on hearing one gig; and at other times, their relationships with musicians have grown from external projects

Since 2001 Everest Records has been putting on gigs under the name r3s3t at venues including the Botanical Garden of the University of Bern (BOGA). The label is also involved in the Swiss-wide summer concert organization ‘Les Digitales’
