= The Fourth Light =

Studio album by Niyaz
- Released: 2015
- Genre: Dance, electronica, World
- Label: Terrestrial Lane Productions
- Producer: Azam Ali and Loga Ramin Torkian

Niyaz chronology
| Sumud Acoustic EP (2013) | The Fourth Light (2015) |

The Fourth Light, released in March 2015, is the fourth full-length studio album by Niyaz, and their first since the departure of former bandmember Carmen Rizzo.

== Track listing ==
1. "Sabza Ba Naz" (The Triumph of love)
2. "Tam e Eshq" (The Taste of love)
3. "Eyvallah Shahim" (Truth)
4. "Yek Nazar" (A Single Glance)
5. "Man Haramam" (I am a sin)
6. "Aurat" (Woman)
7. "Khuda Bowad Yaret" (Divine Companion)
8. "Shir Ali Mardan" (Song of a Warrior)
9. "Marg e Man" (My Elegy)
