= London International Festival of Exploratory Music =

- Dates: Late-October to mid-November
- Locations: London, England, UK
- Years active: 2009–present
- Website: LIFEM.org.UK

The London International Festival of Exploratory Music (LIFEM) is an annual music festival established in 2009, staged at the beginning of November in London, England, United Kingdom. It brings together musicians from across the world, in what the festival defines as exploratory music. Acts that have appeared at the festival include: Terry Riley, Talvin Singh, George Brooks, Wim Mertens, Bruno Sanfilippo, Sylvain Chauveau, Pascal Comelade, Gavin Bryars, Hortus Musicus, Tanya Tagaq, Andrew Poppy, Lonely China Day, Les Yeux Noirs, Cukunft, DJ Scotch Egg, Svjata Vatra, Benjamim Taubkin, Nive Nielsen, Jenni Roditi, Lorcan Mac Mathuna, Coletivo Radio Cipo, Da Cruz, Monster Ceilidh Band, Midori Hirano and Oorutaichi.

The 2012 festival was staged in Kings Place.
