= Elysium for the Brave =

Studio album by Azam Ali
- Released: July 25, 2006
- Genre: World
- Label: Six Degrees Records

Azam Ali chronology
Portals of Grace (2002)	Elysium for the Brave (2006)	From the Night to the Edge of Day (2011)

Professional ratings
Review scores
Source	Rating
AllMusic	4.5/5 stars
Sea of Tranquility	4.5/5 stars

Elysium for the Brave is singer-songwriter Azam Ali's second album.

== Track listing ==
1. "Endless Reverie" (Azam Ali; Carmen Rizzo;) - 5:46
2. "Spring Arrives" (Azam Ali) - 5:16
3. "In Other Worlds" (Azam Ali) - 6:06
4. "Abode" (Hedieh; Sadegh Nojouki) - 5:57
5. "Forty One Ways" (Azam Ali; Tyler Bates) - 6:08
6. "The Tryst" (Azam Ali; Trey Gunn) - 6:04
7. "From Heaven to Dust" (Azam Ali) - 4:20
8. "I Am a Stranger in This World" (Azam Ali; Jeff Rona; Loga Ramin Torkian) - 7:23
9. "In This Divide" (Azam Ali) - 5:18
