= Niyaz (album) =

Studio album by Niyaz
- Released: April 19, 2005 (U.S.)
- Genre: Dance, Electronica, World
- Length: 51:38
- Label: Six Degrees Records
- Producer: Azam Ali, Loga Ramin Torkian and Carmen Rizzo

Niyaz chronology
Niyaz (2005)	Nine Heavens (2008)

Professional ratings
Review scores
Source	Rating
Allmusic	3.5/5 stars

Niyaz is the debut album of the Iranian music group Niyaz, an acoustic electronic project. The word "Niyaz" means "yearning" in Persian.

Niyaz reached #12 in the Billboard Top World Albums chart.

The track Dilruba was remixed by Junkie XL.

== Track listing ==
1. "Ghazal"
2. "Nahan 'The Hidden'"
3. "Allahi Allah"
4. "The Hunt"
5. "Dunya"
6. "In The Shadow Of Life"
7. "Arezou"
8. "Golzar"
9. "Dilruba"
10. "Minara"
11. "Amritsar to Amman" (Digipack bonus track)

== Lyrical content ==
"Nahan" is based on parts of خوش باش که هر که راز داند (Xoš bâš ke har ke râz dânad) from Diwan-e Shams-e Tabrizi by Jalal ad-Din Muhammad Rumi.

"Allahi Allah" is based on a traditional Urdu religious song.

"The Hunt" is based on the poem بیا بریم دشت (Biyâ berim dašt) by the 14th century Persian poet Obeyd-e Zakani.
