= Axiom of Choice (band) =

World music group based in California

Axiom of Choice is a southern California based world music group of Iranian émigrés who perform a modernized fusion style rooted in Persian classical music with inspiration from other classical Middle Eastern and Eastern paradigms.

== History ==
Led by Loga Ramin Torkian, who plays a variant of a guitar of his own invention that is fretted to play quarter tones, the band has a sound combining soaring female vocals, Persian rhythms and melodies, and progressive Western production styles.

The band was named after the mathematical concept, the axiom of choice.

== Discography ==
- Beyond Denial (Faray-e Enkaar) (1996) - X DOT 25 Music
- Niya Yesh (2000) - Narada
- Unfolding (Goshayesh) (2002) - Narada

== See also ==
- Niyaz (similar band)
