= GuitarViol =

Modern bowed guitar

String instrument
- Classification: Bowed string instrument
- Hornbostel–Sachs classification: 321.322-71 (Composite chordophone sounded by a bow)
- Developed: Late 20th century

Related instruments
- Arpeggione; Cello; Guitar; Viol; Viola; Vihuela

The GuitarViol is a modern arpeggione (or bowed guitar) built by guitarist and luthier Jonathan Eric Wilson. It has six strings tuned in E2–A2–D3–G3–B3–E4 in a standard guitar (tenor) tuning, though some use baritone guitar tuning in B1–E2–A2–D3–F#3–B3, with 24 frets. It is most often played in a semi-diagonal, guitar-like playing position and bowed with an underhand “German” bow grip manner similar to the viola da gamba it can also be played vertically like a cello with a cello bow grip. GuitarViols exist in solid body electric, semi-acoustic, and acoustic configurations. GuitarViols have been predominantly used by media composers, with notable examples including the scores of 300, Game of Thrones, and Borderlands.

GuitarViols are built under the TogaMan brand by GuitarViols inc. in Fillmore, California. The brand's name is derived from a toga tenor viol player portrayed in “Noces de Cana” by Paolo Veronese which depicts a playing position used by GuitarViols players.

Notable GuitarViol players include Tyler Bates, Loga Ramin Torkian, Kevin Kiner, Ramin Djawadi, Heitor Pereira, Charlie Clouser, Gary Lionelli, Brian Tyler, Jeff Cardoni, Pat Dimitri, and Justin Melland among others.
