= Carmen Rizzo =

- Born: Carmen Rizzo; 8 April 1964 (age 62); Akron, Ohio, United States
- Genre: Electronic world music
- Occupations: Record producer, songwriter, mixer & engineer, recording artist
- Instruments: Electronic instruments (keyboards, turntables, mixing, programming), drums
- Website: carmenrizzo.com

Carmen Rizzo (born April 8, 1964) is an American record producer, mixer, programmer, DJ, remixer and recording artist, based in Los Angeles. The two-time Grammy nominee has worked with Seal, Coldplay, Paul Oakenfold, Alanis Morissette, Dido, Jem, Niyaz, Ryuichi Sakamoto, Khaled, Tiësto, BT, Esthero, A.R. Rahman and Pete Townshend.

Spanning a record-making career of nearly two decades, Rizzo has worked with record producers Trevor Horn, David Foster, Marius De Vries and Rob Cavallo. In addition to collaborating with Tuvan throat singers Huun Huur Tu, Rizzo also co-founded the world/electronic act Niyaz with Azam Ali and Loga Ramin Torkian (with three #1 iTunes albums), and contributed original music to the David Lynch Foundation album alongside Moby and Peter Gabriel. Rizzo has released his own solo electronic albums: Lost Art of the Idle Moment (2005), Ornament of an Imposter (2008), and Looking Through Leaves (2010), with invited musicians and vocalists as contributors and The Space Left Behind. Rizzo's music also appears in numerous movies and TV shows including CSI Miami and True Blood.

Rizzo is a member of the National Academy of Recording Arts and Sciences, and served on the board of Governors & Trustees (Grammy) as well as on the Producer & Engineering Advisory Board. In these roles Rizzo was partly responsible for introducing the category of Best Electronic Album. Rizzo participated in and hosted the HBO documentary The Song Story, which documents three unsigned music artists produced by him.

As a composer, Rizzo is represented by the William Morris Agency. In addition to scoring films for director Michael Apted, he composed the score for the film Perfect Sisters with Oscar-nominated actress Abigail Breslin and Oscar-winner Mira Sorvino, as well as the end title for the video game, Uncharted 2. Rizzo is represented by Global Positioning Services in Santa Monica, California.

He is also a member of Didon, a collaboration with Tunisian-Canadian singer Meriem Ben Amor who have been two-time Juno Award nominees for Global Music Album of the Year for their albums Malak at the Juno Awards of 2025, and Bab El Mdina at the Juno Awards of 2026.

== Selected discography ==
Year	Artist	Album/Song(s)	Details
2013	Lea Cappelli	Forthcoming Album	Producer, engineer, mixer, co-writer
2013	Carmen Rizzo	Romancia EP	Producer, engineer, mixer, co-writer
2012	Niyaz	Sumud	Producer, programmer, mixer, musician
2011	Carmen Rizzo	The Space Left Behind	Producer, engineer, programmer, mixer
2010	Carmen Rizzo	Looking Through Leaves	Producer, engineer, programmer, mixer
2010	A.R Rahman & Dido	If I Rise from 127 Hours	Remixer
2009	Huun Huur Tu & Carmen Rizzo	Eternal	Producer, engineer, programmer, mixer
2009	Lal Meri	Lal Meri	Producer, engineer, mixer, musician
2008	Carmen Rizzo	Ornament of An Imposter	Producer, engineer, programmer, mixer
2008	Niyaz	Nine Heavens	Producer, programmer, musician
2007	Kate Havnevik	Melankton	Producer, engineer, programmer, mixer, musician
2007	Jes	Disconnect	Mixer
2006	Carmen Rizzo	The Lost Art of the Idle Moment	Producer, engineer, programmer
2005	Coldplay	X&Y	Engineer, programmer, Remixer
2005	Niyaz	Niyaz	Producer, engineer, programmer, mixer, musician
2004	Rachel Fuller	Cigarettes & Housework	Producer (with Pete Townshend)
2003	Delerium	Chimera	Producer, engineer, programmer, mixer, writer
2003	Michael Nyman	Sangam	Producer, engineer
2003	Carla Werner	"Wanderlust" from Departure	Producer, engineer, programmer, mixer, writer
2003	Carmen Rizzo	"Beso" feat. Kinnie Starr, from Thirteen	Producer Engineer, programmer, mixer, writer
2002	Conjure One	Sleep	Remixer
2002	Paul Oakenfold	Bunkka	Producer, engineer, remixer, mixer, musician, writer
2002	Alanis Morissette	Under Rug Swept	Engineer, programmer, mixer
2001	Perry Farrell	Song Yet to Be Sung	Engineer, programmer, mixer
2001	Grant Lee Phillips	Mobilize	Producer, engineer, programmer, mixer
2000	Supreme Beings of Leisure	Supreme Beings of Leisure	Producer, engineer, mixer
1999	Mel C	Northern Star	Engineer, mixer
1999	Povi	Life in Volcanoes	Producer, engineer, programmer, mixer, musician
1999	Beth Nielsen Chapman	"Message in a Bottle" from Message in a Bottle Motion Picture	Producer, engineer, programmer, mixer, musician
1999	Alanis Morissette	"Still" from Dogma	Programmer, musician
1998	Alanis Morissette	"Uninvited" from City of Angels	Engineer, programmer, musician
1996	Doyle Bramhall	Doyle Bramhall II	Engineer, mixer
1996	Freakpower	More of Everything for Everybody	Mixer
1994	Seal	Seal II	Engineer, programmer, mixer, musician
1993	Ray Charles	My World	Mixer
1993	Les Rita Mitsouko	Système D	Engineer, mixer
