= Issa Bagayogo =

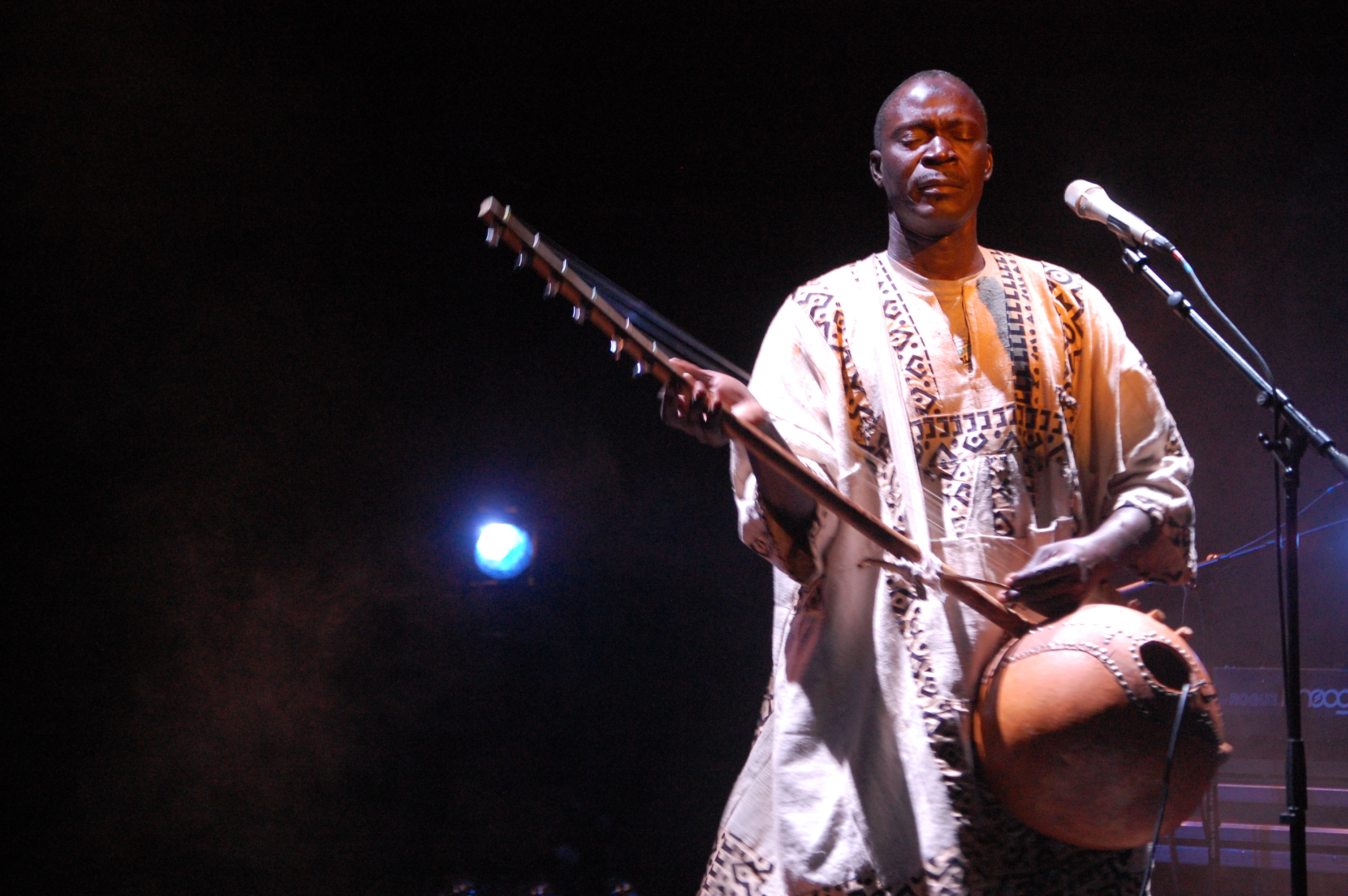

Background information
- Born: 1961; Mali
- Died: 10 October 2016 (aged 55)
- Genres: World Music
- Occupation: Musician
- Years active: 1998 - 2016

Issa Bagayogo (1961 – 10 October 2016) was a Malian musician. He released four full-length albums all under the record label Six Degrees Records. Bagayogo lent his voice and played the kamele n'goni (a six-stringed West African instrument similar to a banjo) while Yves Wernert was the producer and keyboardist. Bagayogo died after a long illness on 10 October 2016.

== Career ==
Bagayogo blended his native Malian traditions with western pop music and drew comparisons to some of the great Malian musicians such as Ali Farka Touré and Toumani Diabaté.

Sya, originally released in 1998, was the first album released under Six Degrees Records. The second album is titled Timbuktu, after the ancient city in Mali. The album covers issues such as racial tolerance, regional pride, and drug abuse among youths. Bagayogo continued his fusion of his native African style music with electronic beats on this album.

In 2004, Bagayogo released his album called Tassoumakan, which means "voice of fire", followed by Mali Koura in 2008.

== Discography ==
- Sya (1999) Six Degrees Records
- Timbuktu (2002) Six Degrees Records
- Tassoumakan (2004) Six Degrees Records
- Mali Koura (2008) Six Degrees Records
