= Huun-Huur-Tu =

Tuvan music group

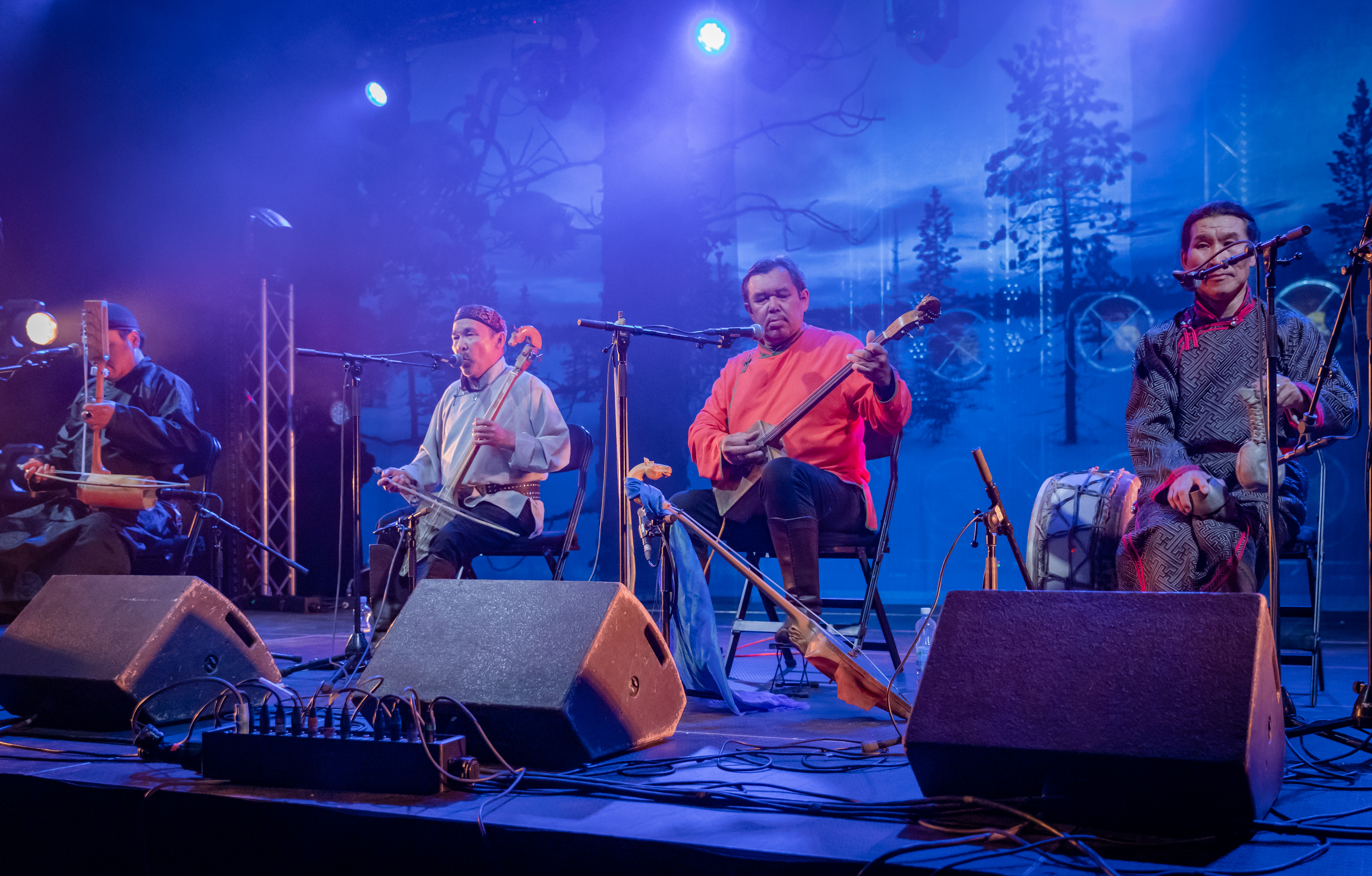
- Performance in Helsinki, 2018

Background information
- Origin: Tuva
- Genres: Throat singing; world; folk
- Years active: 1992–present
- Members: Kaigal-ool Khovalyg; Sayan Bapa; Radik Tülüsh; Alexei Saryglar
- Past members: Albert Kuvezin; Alexander Bapa; Andrey Mongush; Anatoli Kuular
- Website: huunhuurtu.wordpress.com

Huun-Huur-Tu (Tuvan: Хүн Хүртү, romanized: Xün Xürtü [ˌxʏn xʏrˈtʰʏ]; Russian: Хуун-Хуур-Ту [ˌxuːn xuːr ˈtʊ]) are a music group from Tuva, a Russian federative republic situated on the Mongolia–Russia border. Their music includes throat singing, in which the singers sing both a note and its overtones, thus producing two or three notes simultaneously. The overtone may sound like a flute, whistle or bird, but is solely a product of the human voice.

The group primarily use native Tuvan instruments such as the igil, khomus (Tuvan jaw harp), doshpuluur, and dünggür (shaman drum). However, in recent years, the group have begun to selectively incorporate Western instruments, such as the guitar. While the thrust of Huun-Huur-Tu's music is fundamentally indigenous Tuvan folk music, they also experiment with incorporating Western instruments and electronic music.

== History ==
The khöömei quartet Kunggurtug (Tuvan: Куңгуртуг, [ˈqʰʊɴ.ɢʊr.tʰʊʁ]) was founded in 1992 by Kaigal-ool Khovalyg, brothers Alexander and Sayan Bapa, and Albert Kuvezin. Not long afterwards, the group changed its name to Huun-Huur-Tu, meaning "sunbeams" (literally "sun propeller"). The focus of their music was traditional Tuvan folk songs, frequently featuring imagery of the Tuvan steppe or of horses.

The ensemble released its first album, 60 Horses In My Herd, the following year. The album was recorded at studios in London and Mill Valley, California. By the time recording began for the follow-up, Kuvezin had left the group to form the more rock-oriented Yat-Kha. Kuvezin was replaced by Anatoli Kuular, who had previously worked with Khovalyg and Kongar-ool Ondar as part of the Tuva Ensemble. The new line-up recorded The Orphan's Lament in New York City and Moscow, and released it in 1994.

In 1995, Alexander Bapa, who had produced the first two albums, departed the group to pursue production as a full-time career. He was replaced by Alexei Saryglar, formerly a member of the Russian state ensemble Siberian Souvenir. A third album, If I'd Been Born An Eagle, recorded in the Netherlands, followed in 1997. In early 1999, the group released its fourth album, Where Young Grass Grows.

Huun-Huur-Tu participated in the 2000 BBC Music Live event. The following year, the group released their first live album.

In 2003, Kuular quit the group and was replaced by Andrey Mongush, an experienced teacher of khöömei and Tuvan instruments. Mongush's tenure with the group was short and in 2005 he was replaced by Radik Tülüsh, formerly of Yat-Kha fame.

Huun-Huur-Tu signed with Beijing management company Stallion Era in March 2015.

== Collaboration ==
Since the group's inception, Huun Huur Tu has collaborated with musicians from many genres, such as Frank Zappa, Johnny "Guitar" Watson, the Kodo drummers, The Moscow Art Trio, the Kronos Quartet, The Chieftains and Bulgarian women's singing group, Angelite. Their recording "Eternal" is a collaborative effort with underground electronic musician, Carmen Rizzo. Huun Huur Tu appeared on three songs on Bahamut, the debut of New York-based blues group Hazmat Modine. In January 2010, Hazmat Modine also announced plans to record with Huun Huur Tu again.

== In popular culture ==
Huun-Huur-Tu's Radik Tülüsh song "Oskus Urug" was featured in the American television series Fargo's third-season episode "The Law of Vacant Places" and "Prayer" from the 1994 album The Orphan's Lament was featured in fifth-season episode "The Paradox of Intermediate Transactions". In 2001, several of Huun-Huur-Tu's songs were featured on the soundtrack of Atanarjuat: The Fast Runner, a 2001 Cannes Winner.

== Gallery ==
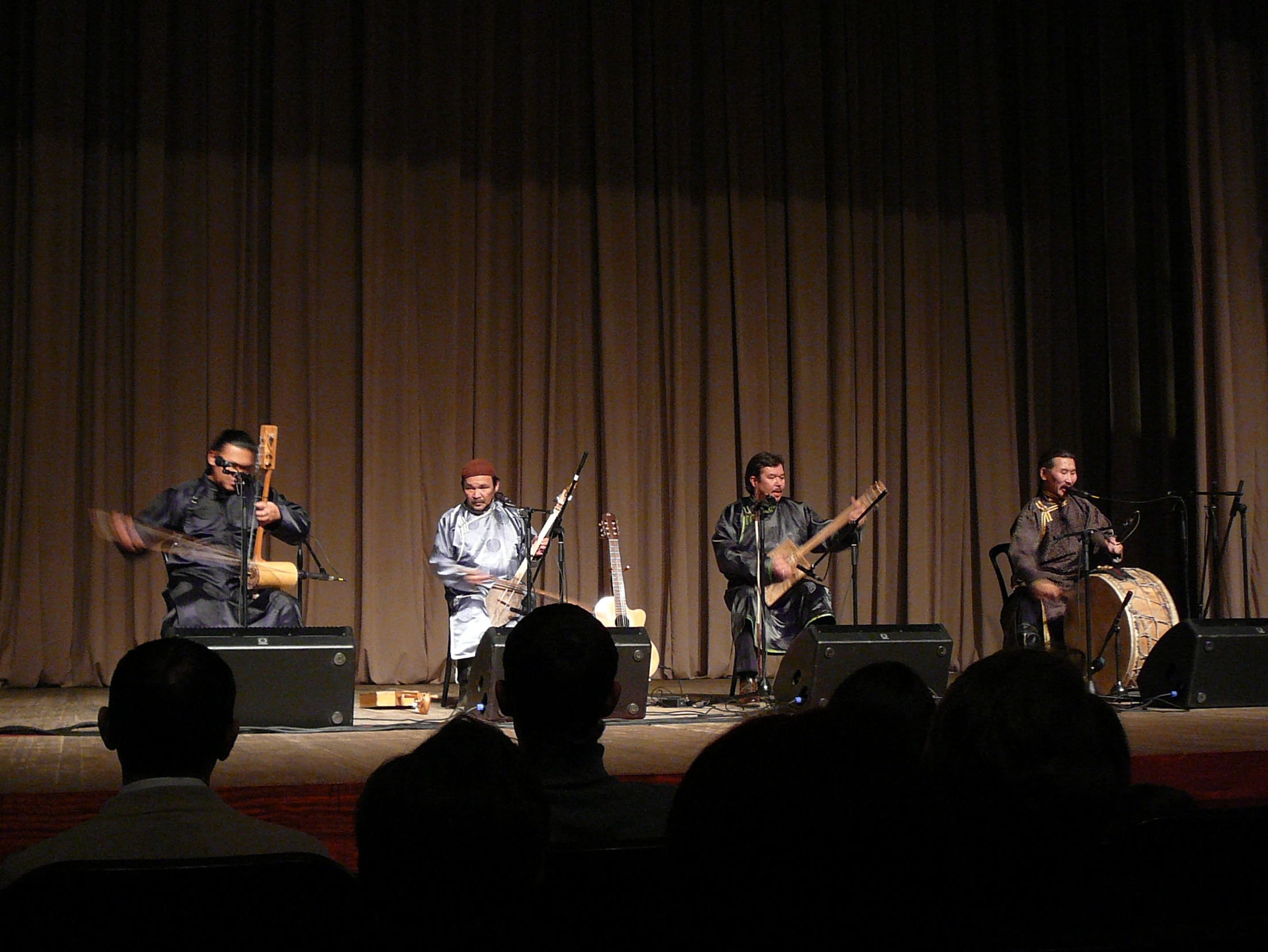
Performance in Tyumen, 28th October 2012: Radik Tülüsh, Kaigal-ool Khovalyg, Sayan Bapa, Alexei Saryglar

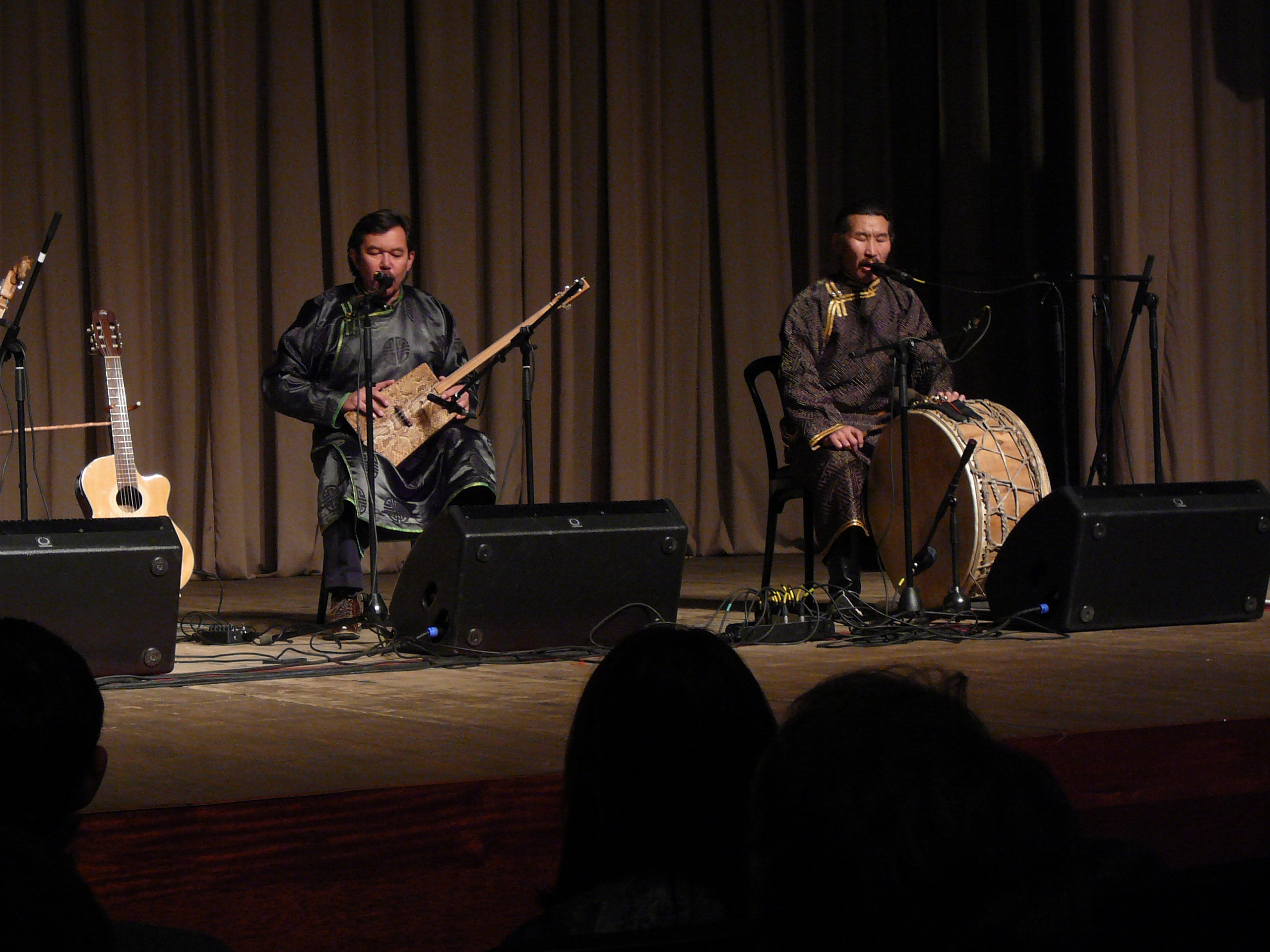
Sayan Bapa and Alexei Saryglar

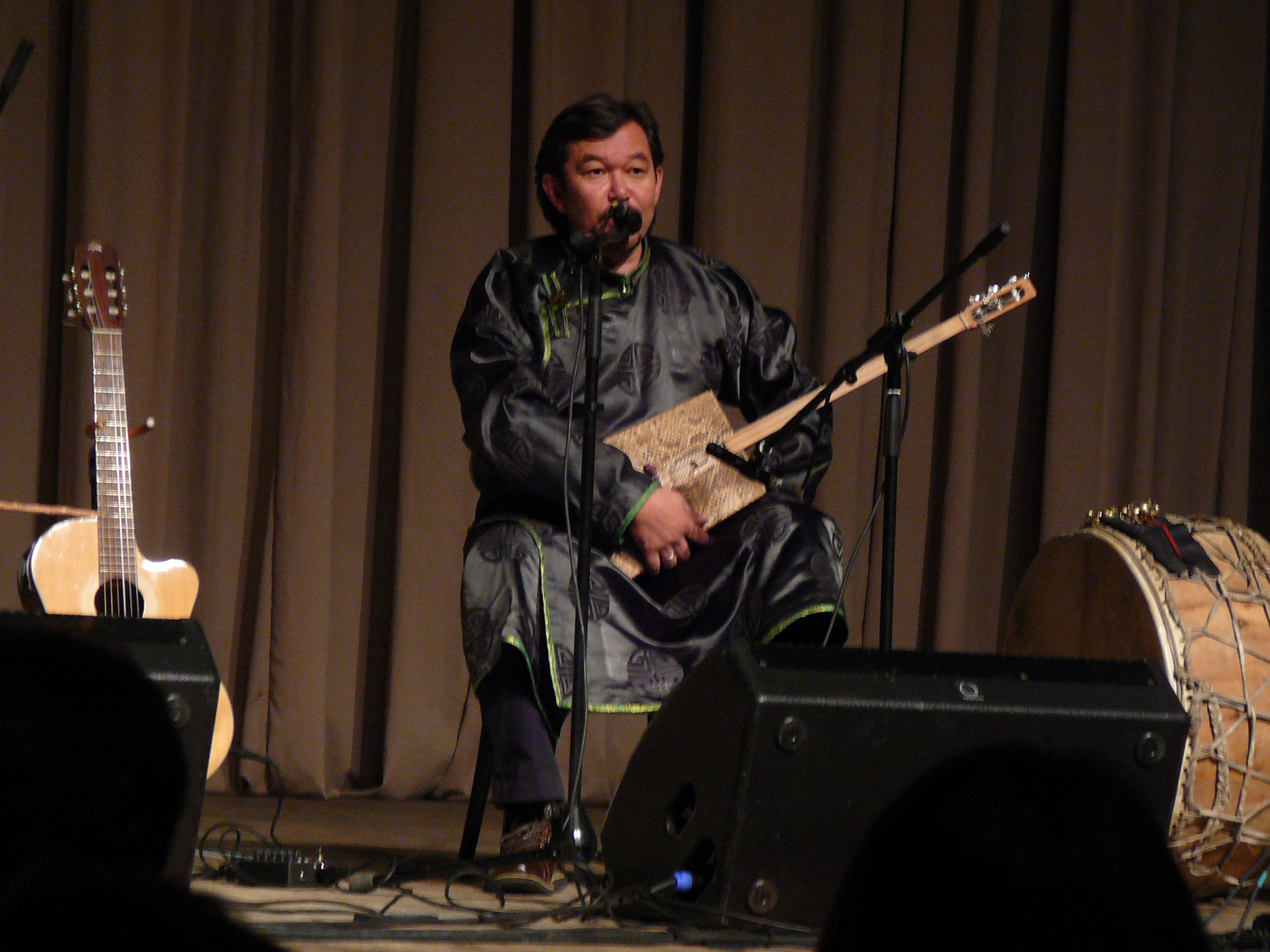
Sayan Bapa

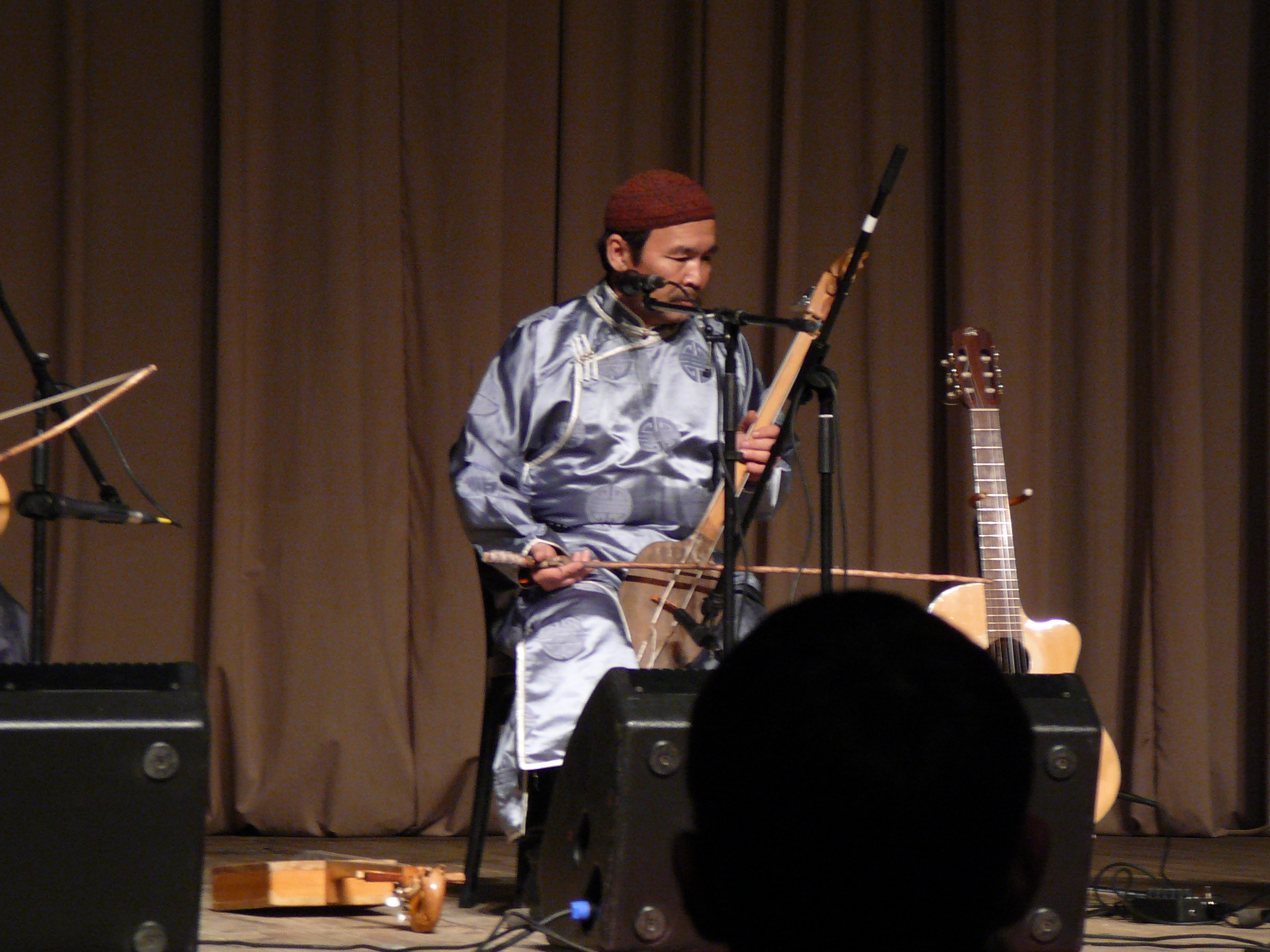
Kaigal-ool Khovalyg

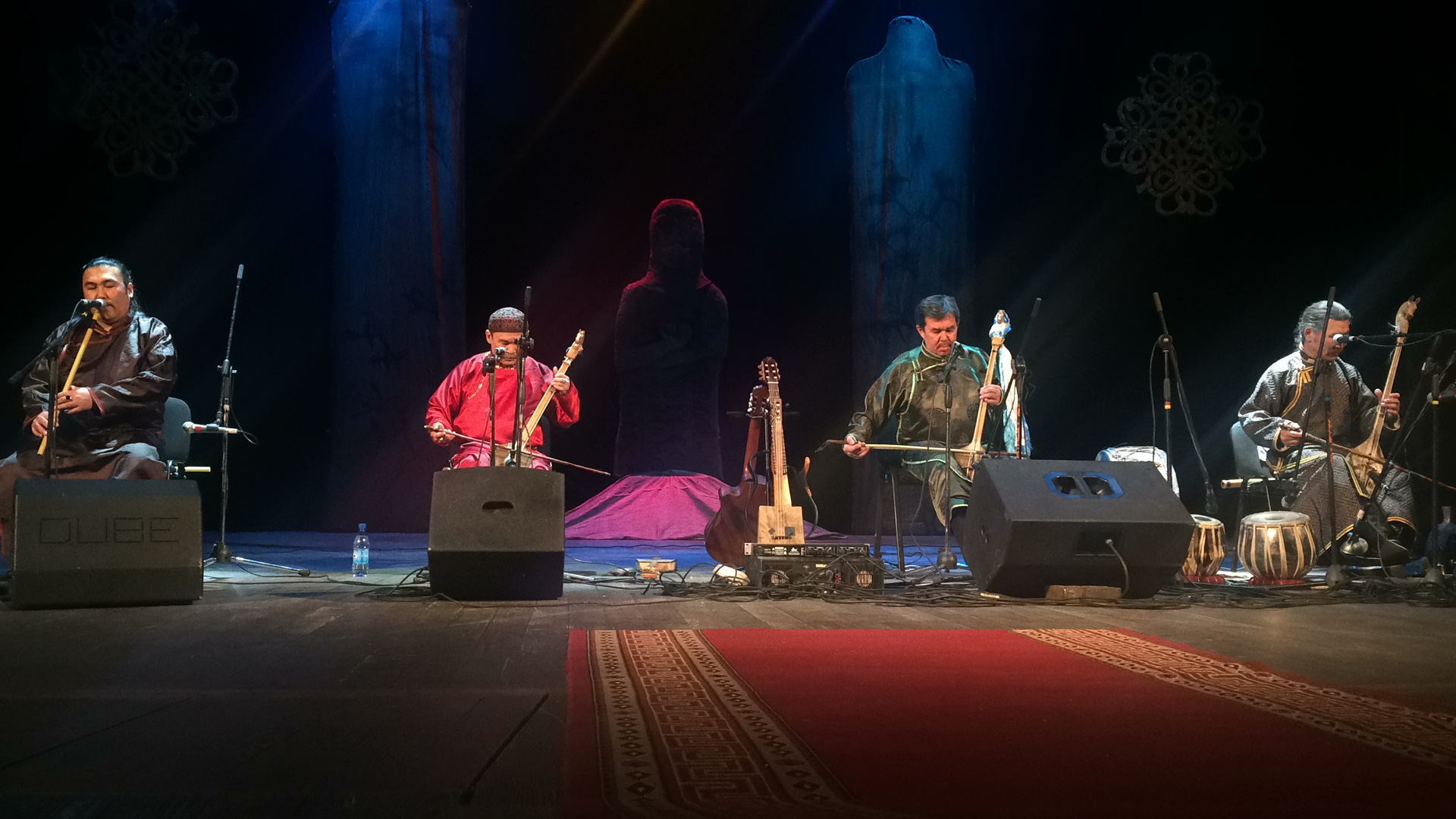
2016: Concert in honor of the 50th anniversary of Alexei

== Recordings ==
Solo releases

- 60 Horses In My Herd (1993)
- The Orphan's Lament (1994)
- If I'd Been Born An Eagle (1997)
- Where Young Grass Grows (1999)
- Live 1 [also known as Best * Live] (2001)
- Live 2 (2001)
- More Live (2003)
- Ancestors Call (2010)

With The Bulgarian Voices - Angelite & Sergey Starostin:

- Fly, Fly My Sadness (1996)

With The Bulgarian Voices - Angelite & Moscow Art Trio:

- Mountain Tale (1998)
- Legend (2010)

With various electronic artists (remixes):

- Spirits from Tuva (2002 & 2003)

With Malerija (remix album):

- Huun-huur-tu Malerija (2002)

With Samsonov:

- Altai Sayan Tandy-Uula (2004)

With Sainkho Namtchylak:

- Mother-Earth! Father-Sky! (2008)

With Carmen Rizzo:

- Eternal (2009)
- Koshkyn (EP, 2018)

With Vladimir Martynov (chamber orchestra Opus Posth, singer Mikhail Stepanitch & choir Mlada):

- Children of the Otter (2009)

Collaborations:

With Marcel Vanthilt:

- I Shoot Dikke Jo single (1995)

With Kronos Quartet:

- Early Music (Lachrymae Antiquae) (1997)

18. "Uleg-Khem" Trad. Tuvan arr. Steve Mackey (3:15)

With Hazmat Modine:

- Bahamut (2007)

2. "It Calls Me" (Featuring Huun-Huur-Tu) Schuman (3:10)

8. "Everybody Loves You" (Featuring Huun-Huur-Tu) Schuman (6:16)

14. "Man Trouble" (Featuring Huun-Huur-Tu) Jaybird Coleman / Traditional (11:11)

With Ross Daly:

- The White Dragon - Alive (2008)
