= Titus (soundtrack) =

Soundtrack album by Elliot Goldenthal
- Released: Jan 11, 2000
- Genres: Classical; Avant-garde; Modernist; Musique concrète Jazz fusion Alternative Rock; Electronica
- Length: 61:42
- Labels: Sony Classical; SK 89171
- Producer: Matthias Gohl

Elliot Goldenthal chronology
In Dreams (1999)	Titus (2000)	Final Fantasy: The Spirits Within (2001)

Professional ratings
Review scores
Source	Rating
Allmusic	4/5 stars
Soundtracknet	4/5 stars
Scorereviews.com	5/5 stars
Movie-Wave.net	5/5 stars
Moviemusicuk.us	5/5 stars

Titus is the original soundtrack to the 1999 motion picture Titus. Elliot Goldenthal wrote the score for the film, an adaptation of Shakespeare's first, and bloodiest, tragedy Titus Andronicus; written and directed by Julie Taymor, Goldenthal's long-time friend and partner. The only non-Goldenthal piece is an old Italian song called "Vivere" performed by Italian singer Carlo Buti.

== The Score ==
Like all of Goldenthal's other work the score is extremely experimental, blending orchestral, jazz, rock, and electronica styles and complementing Taymor's unique and off-beat adaptation of the Shakespearean play. In keeping with many other Goldenthal scores the orchestra used was the British London Metropolitan Orchestra. The score also contains samples from earlier Goldenthal scores, including a reworked version of "Wreckage and Rape" from the soundtrack to Alien 3, which plays during the dinner table fight scene.

The score, according to Goldenthal himself, sums up his film scoring career up to that point; "This score is a culmination of my style. It sums up the type of work I've been doing for the past ten years."

He explains it saying,

"O Cruel Irreligious piety!" With this oxymoron - the Goth Queen Tamora's plea to spare her son from being sacrificed at the hands of the Andronici – Shakespeare starts the engine that drives the play – the engine that drives my music. it is fueled by the combustion of opposites: vengeance and forgiveness, purity and defilement, the grotesque and the sublime. But there is another byproduct – for this lamentable tale of woe oddly yields a great deal of irony and humor. In perhaps one of Shakespeare's most absurdist moments (Act III, scene i) the two heads of Titus' wrongly accused sons, and the General's own severed hand, are cruelly returned to him outside his home. At this nightmarish presentation, Titus inexplicably breaks into laughter. He then commands his handless daughter, Lavinia, to take up his severed hand between her teeth and enter the house. Performance after performance, production after production, audiences nervously laugh at this scene, thus falling into Shakespeare's ingenious trap: the playwright has devilishly induced the audience into a similar state to Titus' – involuntarily laughing at the horror. Such unexpected juxtapositions forced me to find unexpected musical solutions.But let me take you back to the beginning. Almost one year prior to the commencement of principal photography on Titus, I was encouraged by Julie Taymor and scenic designer Dante Ferretti to accompany them on location scouting in Rome. On day one, glancing at the Palatine Hills from a 1998 Fiat, we saw the great Circus Maximus with the ruins of privileged patricians' villas perched overhead, and I heard in my mind's ear an archetypal ancient percussion ensemble. In that same moment, another car pulled up alongside ours, equipped with a sub woofer – with the pentameters and hexameters of hip-hop blasting through every window. The music cross-faded as I watched a group of Andean pan flute players in native Bolivian garb hawking their tapes and playing their music, which was almost drowned out by an Elvis impersonator with a cheap karaoke setup – replete with cheesy reverb – singing "Jailhouse Rock" in a Neapolitan dialect...well, you get the idea. My mind was put at ease: in Rome – as in this film – it is possible in an instant to embrace æons.

— Elliot Goldenthal

== Track listing ==
1. "Victorius Titus" – 2:58
2. "Procession & Obsequis" – 3:00
3. "Revenge Wheel" – 0:54
4. "Tribute & Suffrage" – 4:17
5. "Arrows of the Gods" – 1:33
6. "An Offering" – 2:04
7. "Crossroads" – 3:24
8. "Vortex" – 1:34
9. "Swing Rave" – 1:53
10. "Ill-Fated Plot" – 2:20
11. "Pickled Heads" – 5:05
12. "Tamora's Pastorale" – 1:13
13. "Titus' Vow" – 3:43
14. "Mad Ole Titus" – 2:27
15. "Philimelagram" – 1:46
16. "Pressing Judgement" – 3:32
  - From A Time to Kill
17. "Aaron's Plea" – 2:01
18. "Coronation" – 1:54
19. "Apian Stomp" – 1:32
20. "Adagio" – 2:25
21. "Finale" – 8:34
22. "Vivere" – 3:33
  - By Carlo Buti

== 300 score controversy ==
The score for the 2007 film 300, composed by Tyler Bates became the subject of much criticism regarding the somewhat liberal use of other composers' orchestrations (at times note for note) including pieces from Goldenthal's Titus score; in particular "Victorius Titus" and "Finale". Warner Bros. Pictures released a statement clarifying the matter with regards to the similarities to Goldenthal's work:

Warner Bros. Pictures acknowledges and regrets that a number of the music cues for the score of "300" were, without our knowledge or participation, derived from music composed by Academy Award winning composer Elliot Goldenthal for the motion picture "Titus." Warner Bros. Pictures has great respect for Elliot, our longtime collaborator, and is pleased to have amicably resolved this matter.

== Audio ==
As mentioned above, the score blends several styles of music; below are some examples of this including the two tracks concerned in the controversy with the "300" score.

"Victorius Titus"
Sample of "Victorius Titus" from the album Titus.

The imposing, martial opening cue used in the credits as Titus and his legions enter the arena.

"Finale"
Sample of "Finale" from the album Titus.

The romantic and slow paced piece used at the end of the film that slowly rises to a dramatic crescendo.

"Swing Rave"
Sample of "Swing Rave" from the album Titus.

An example of the jazz fusion used in the party scene at the Imperial Palace.

== Crew/Credit ==
- Teese Gohl - Producer
- Joel Iwataki - Engineer
- Joel Iwataki - Mixing
- Richard Martinez - Electronic Music Producer
- Stephen McLaughlin - Engineer
- Stephen McLaughlin - Orchestration
- Vladimir Meller - Mastering
- Jonathan Sheffer - Conductor
- Elliot Goldenthal - Producer
- Elliot Goldenthal - Liner Notes
- Elliot Goldenthal - Orchestration
- Vic Fraser - Music Preparation
- Curtis Roush - Music Editor
- Julian Broad - Cover Photo
- Robert Elhai - Orchestration
- Lawrence Manchester - Engineer
- Lawrence Manchester - Music Editor
- Steven Mercurio - Conductor
- Julie Taymor - Liner Notes
- Andy Brown - Orchestra Contractor
- London Metropolitan Orchestra - Orchestra
- Page Hamilton, Mark Stewart, Andrew Hawkins, David Reid, Eric Hubel - "Guitar Orchestra" Deaf Elk
- Carlo Buti - "Vivere"
- Daryl Kell - Music Editor
