= The Orphan's Lament =

Studio album by Huun-Huur-Tu
- Released: 1994
- Genre: Tuvan throat singing
- Label: Shanachie
- Producer: Alexander Bapa

Huun-Huur-Tu chronology
60 Horses in My Herd (1993)	The Orphan's Lament (1994)	If I'd Been Born an Eagle (1997)

The Orphan's Lament is an album by the Tuvan musical group Huun-Huur-Tu. It was released in 1994. The group supported the album with a North American tour.

== Production ==
Recorded in New York and Moscow, the album was produced by Alexander Bapa, who also played percussion. Anatoli Kuular joined the group after the departure of Albert Kuvezin. The group used a doshpuluur as well as a dazhaanning khavy, a percussive instrument crafted from a bull scrotum.

== Critical reception ==
Professional ratings
Review scores
Source	Rating
AllMusic	4.5/5 stars
Entertainment Weekly	A−
MusicHound World: The Essential Album Guide	5/5 stars

Entertainment Weekly praised the "rich, piercingly evocative musical universe." The New York Times wrote that "the group has met Western listeners partway, keeping songs short and varied; some sound like Appalachian rural tunes from half a world away." The San Diego Union-Tribune noted that "the vocal intensity has been toned down in places and there is a greater emphasis on lilting instrumental work." The Record stated that "there are subtle rhythmic patterns and even subtler musical textures that imitate the sound of creatures and the wind of the Siberian plains."

AllMusic wrote: "Not content to blindly follow traditional Central Asian folk music, Huun Huur Tu's four, sometimes five, performers create an ensemble that offers a complex, fascinating, and harmonious mixture." The album was included in 1,000 Recordings to Hear Before You Die. In 2003, The Independent listed it among the 50 essential "world music" albums.

== Track listing ==
No.	Title	Length
1.	"Prayer"
2.	"Ancestors"
3.	"Aa-Shuu Dekei-Oo"
4.	"Eerbek-Aksy"
5.	"The Orphan's Lament"
6.	"Kaldak Khamar"
7.	"Steppe"
8.	"Borbanngadyr"
9.	"Chiraa-Khoor ('The Yellow Trotter')"
10.	"Exile's Song"
11.	"Eki Attar"
12.	"Irik Chuduk ('The Rotting Log')"
13.	"Sygyt"
14.	"Agitator"
15.	"Khomuz Medley"
16.	"Ödugen Taiga"
