= Arpeggione =

Bowed six-string musical instrument

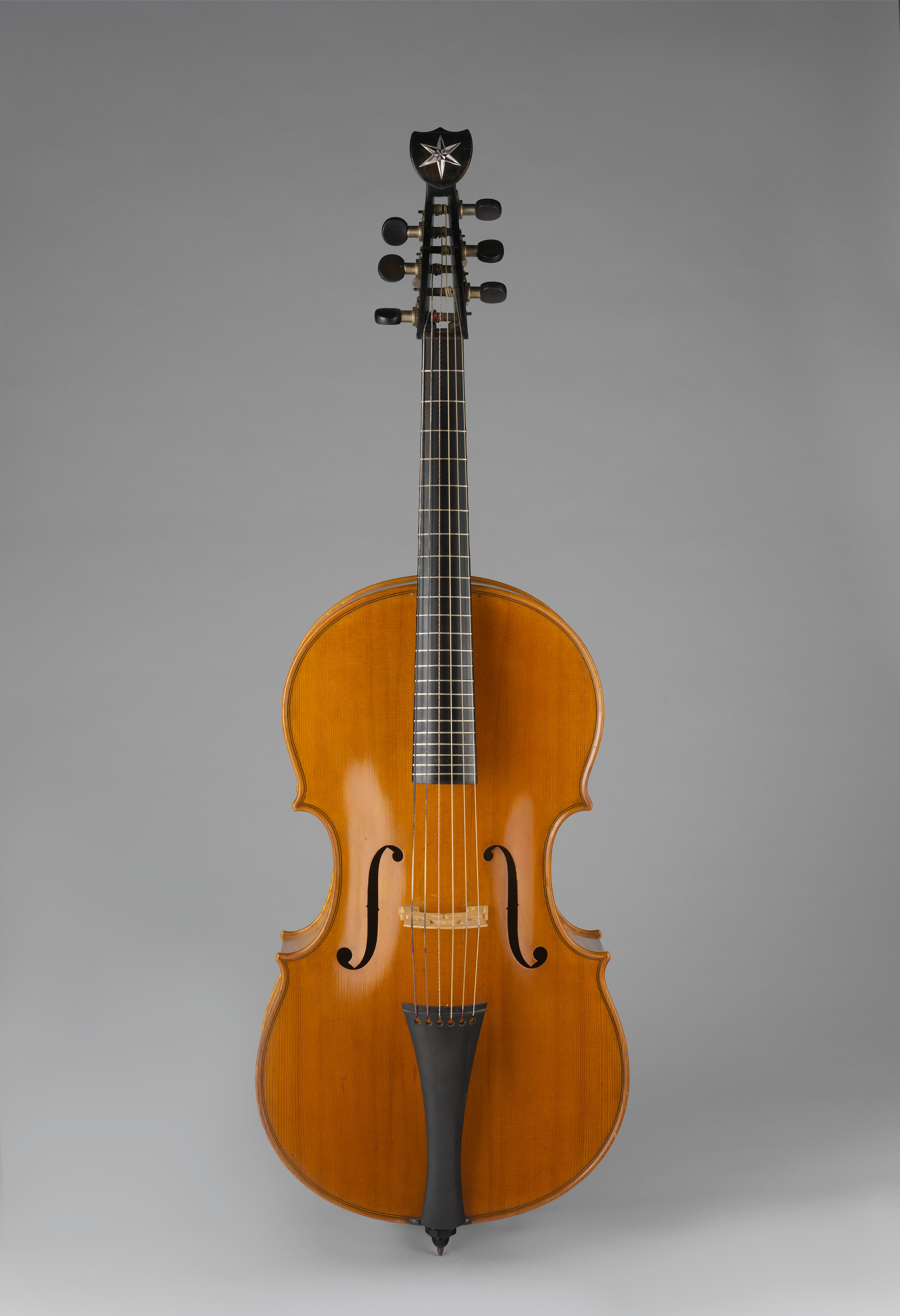
- Arpeggione built in 1968 by Henning Aschauer following specifications of Alfred Lessing.

String instrument
- Classification: Bowed string instrument
- Hornbostel–Sachs classification: 321.322-71 (Composite chordophone sounded by a bow)
- Developed: 1823

Related instruments
- Cello; Guitar; Viol; Vihuela

The arpeggione is a six-stringed musical instrument fretted and tuned like a guitar, but with a curved bridge so it can be bowed like a cello, and thus similar to the bass viola da gamba. The instrument is sometimes also called a guitar violoncello. It is essentially a bass viol with a guitar-type tuning, E–A–d–g–b–e' . The body shape of the arpeggione is, however, more similar to a medieval fiddle than either the guitar or the bass viol. The arpeggione is especially suited to playing runs in thirds, double stops, and arpeggios.

It enjoyed a brief period of popularity for perhaps a decade after its invention around 1823 by the Viennese instrument luthiers Johann Georg Stauffer and Peter Teufelsdorfer. The only notable extant piece for the arpeggione is a sonata with piano accompaniment by Franz Schubert, D.821, published in 1871, when the instrument was long out of vogue. The sonata is now usually played on the cello or viola and has been transcribed for other instruments.

In the 21st century, a revival of interest in the arpeggione has led to the composition of a number of new works either for the instrument alone or within an ensemble.

Composers who have written the largest number of works include the American Dov Joshua Rosenschein, France's Grégory Guéant, and René Mogensen from Denmark.

Contemporary designs of viol-like instruments have similarities to the arpeggione, and at least one (the GuitarViol) was directly influenced by Stauffer's arpeggione.
