= Bruno Sanfilippo =

Argentine pianist and composer

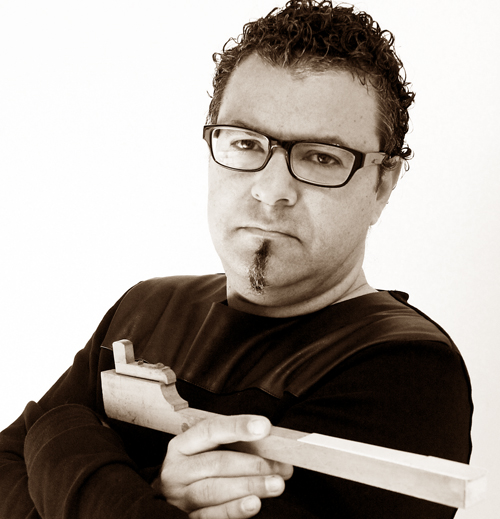

Background information
- Birth name: Bruno Sanfilippo
- Born: 13 September 1965 (age 59); Buenos Aires, Argentina
- Genres: Contemporary classical music, ambient music
- Occupations: Pianist; composer
- Instrument(s): Piano, synthesizer, keyboard
- Years active: 1991–present
- Labels: ad21, 1631Recordings, Dronarivm
- Website: www.bruno-sanfilippo.com

Bruno Sanfilippo (born September 13, 1965) is an Argentine pianist and composer from Buenos Aires, Argentina. He currently resides in Barcelona, Spain. His sound has been described as an exploration of minimalist piano concepts and electroacoustic music. In 2015, he became one of the main exponents of the LIFEM 2015 festival, specializing in minimalist music.

== Biography ==
The artist began playing the piano at a young age, starting with the Pleyel et Cie piano from his parents' home in Buenos Aires. Although Sanfilippo draws inspiration from various genres, in his early years, he was influenced by classical composers such as Erik Satie, Claude Debussy and Maurice Ravel.

In 1988, Sanfilippo graduated from the Galvani Conservatory in Buenos Aires with a degree in Musical Composition.

In 2000, the artist left his native Argentina and began his life, and a new chapter of his career, in Barcelona, Spain.

== Career ==
In 1998, Sanfilippo started Ad21 music, a personal platform/label responsible for some of his albums except, The Poet, which was signed with 1631 Recordings and Decca Publishing in 2016, and Unity through the Russian label Dronarivm in 2018.

Sanfilippo has participated in concerts and music festivals in both the national and international music scene. This includes performances at the Insolit Music Forum in Barcelona in 2007, the Stalker festival in Tallinn in 2012, the Antara Festival in London in 2013 and the LIFM festival in London in 2015.

The LIFEM 2015, or the London International Festival of Exploratory Music, was an opportunity for Sanfilippo to participate in the Minimalism Unwrapped series with fellow composers, Wim Mertens, Sylvain Chauveau and Greg Haines.

He has been lauded as an "exceptionally refined sound-sculptor" and his work has been compared to Max Richter, Arvo Pärt, Jóhann Jóhannsson, Harold Budd, and many more in the area of contemporary classical.

== In pop culture ==
A sample of Sanfilippo's "Ambessence Piano & Drones 1" was used in Canadian rapper Drake's 2013 song "Started from the Bottom".

== Discography ==
Title	Album details
Suite Patagonia	Released: 2000; Label: ad21
Visualia	Released: 2003; Label: Neuronium Records
Indalo	Released: 2004; Label: ad21
Ad Libitum	Released: 2004; Label: ad21
Anthology Essence 91-04	Released: 2005; Label: Neuronium Records
InTRO	Released: 2006; Label: ad21
Piano Textures	Released: 2007; Label: ad21
Ambessence Piano & Drones	Released: 2008; Label: ad21
Auralspace	Released: 2009; Label: ad21
Piano Textures 2	Released: 2009; Label: ad21
Cromo piano & drones	Released: 2010; Label: ad21
Subliminal Pulse	Released: 2011; Label: Spotted Peccary
Bioma	Released: 2011; Label: ad21
Urbs	Released: 2012; Label: Hypnos Recordings
Impromptu EP	Released: 2012; Label: ad21
Piano Texture Found EP	Released: 2012; Label: Laverna
Piano Textures 3	Released: 2012; Label: ad21
ClarOscuro	Released: 2014; Label: ad21
Inside Life	Released: 2015; Label: ad21
Upon Contact Reworked	Released: 2015; Label: ad21
The Poet	Released: 2016; Label: 1631Recordings
Piano Textures 4	Released: 2016; Label: ad21
Lost & Found	Released: 2017; Label: ad21
Unity	Released: 2018; Label: Dronarivm
InTRO remastered & expanded	Released: 2018; Label: ad21
Pianette	Released: 2019; Label: ad21
