= Carlo Buti =

Italian singer

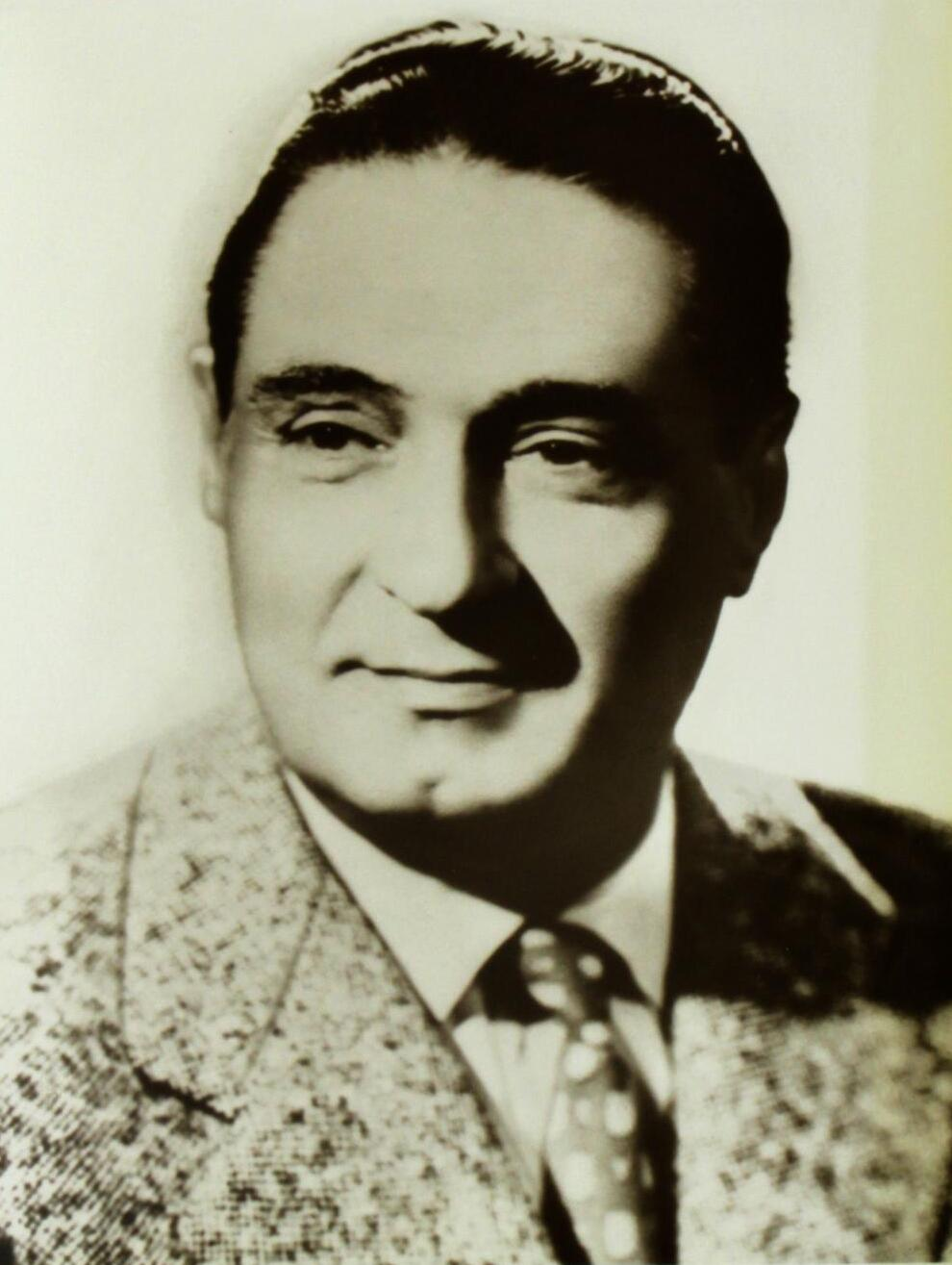

Carlo Buti (14 November 1902 – 16 November 1963) was an Italian interpreter of popular and folk music. He was known as "the Golden Voice of Italy", and was possibly the earliest superstar of Italian music in the twentieth century. He recorded 1574 songs during his career.

== Biography ==
Buti was born in Florence, Italy. As a boy, he mastered the Tuscan folk song technique known as stornello. He was soon being paid by other men to serenade their girlfriends. He received limited vocal training from Raoul Frazzi. He was featured on Italian radio. His first recording contract (1930) was with Edison-Bell Records. In 1934 he signed with Columbia Records.

Buti has been called the Bing Crosby and the "Frank Sinatra of Italy", because of his preference for the popular songs of the day over the more operatic-type songs. He retired in 1956 after having recorded 1574 songs. At the time, his was the most-recorded voice in Italian music history. His unique warm and melodic "tenorino" style of high quasi-falsetto phrasing sung in the "mezza voce" made him an international success. He also starred in several Italian movies. He died at his home in Montelupo Fiorentino, in Tuscany, Italy, at the age of 61.

One of his songs "Vivere" appears on the score to the 2000 film "Titus" by Elliot Goldenthal.

Among his most memorable songs:

- "Faccetta Nera"
- "La Paloma" ISWC: T-800.326.614-7
- "Amapola"
- "Tornerai"
- La piccinina (Ferry Boat Serenade) ISWC: T-005.008.751-8
- "Dove Sta Zazà"
- "Amore Amore"
- "Il Primo Amore non si Scorda mai"
- "Fiorin Fiorello l'amore è bello"
- "Signorinella Pallida"

== Filmography ==
- Naples in Green and Blue (1935)
- For Men Only (1938)
