= Kaigal-ool Khovalyg =

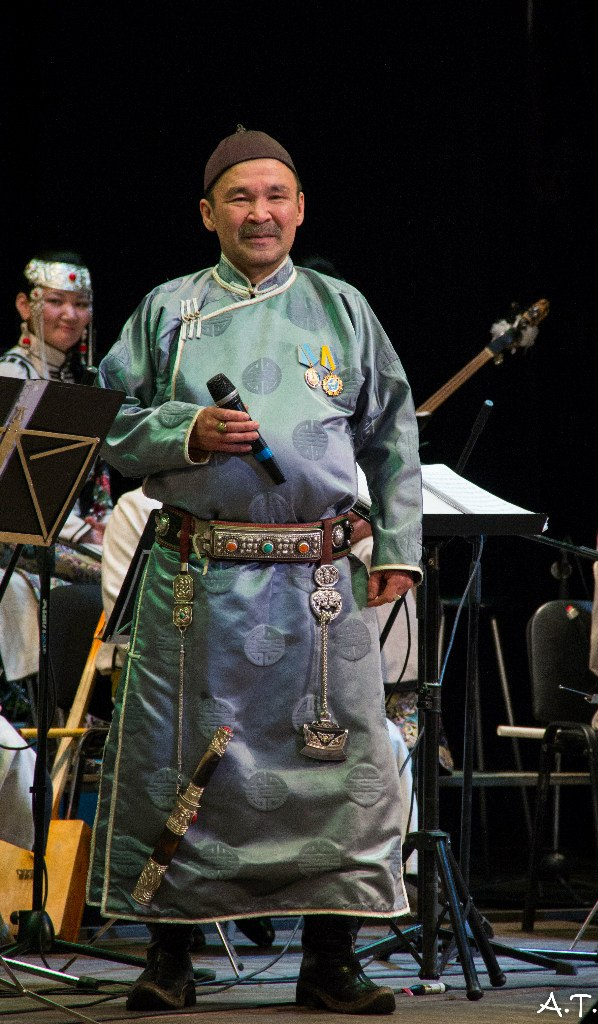
- Khovalyg performing in Tyumen, 2016

Background information
- Born: Kaigal-ool Kim-oolovich Khovalyg; 20 August 1960 (age 65); Bajyn-Alaak, Tuvan Autonomous Oblast, Soviet Union (now Tuva Republic, Russia)
- Genres: Khoomei; folk
- Occupation: Singer
- Instruments: Vocals; igil
- Years active: 1979–present

Kaigal-ool Kim-oolovich Khovalyg (Note: Russian: Ховалыг Кайгал-оол Ким-оолович, romanized: Chovalyg Kajgal-ool Kim-oolovič; Tuvan: Ховалыг Кайгал-оол Ким-оол оглу, romanized: Xovalıg Kaygal-ôl Kim-ôl oglu, IPA: [χo̞ʋɐˈɫɤ̞ʁ qʰɐjˈʁɐɫ o̞ːɫ kʰɪm o̞ːɫ o̞ˈʁɫʊ].) (born 20 August 1960) is a Tuvan throat singer and co-founder of the Tuvan music group Huun-Huur-Tu.

A self-taught overtone singer, Khovalyg worked as a shepherd until the age of 18. His musical career began when he was invited to join the Tuvan State Ensemble in 1979. He settled in Kyzyl and started teaching throat singing and igil. In 1993, after more than ten years with the State Ensemble, he left to devote his attention to his newly formed group, Huun-Huur-Tu.

He has performed and recorded with the Tuva Ensemble, Vershki da Koreshki, the World Groove Band, and the Volkov Trio.

With a vocal range spanning tenor and bass, Khovalyg is particularly known for his skill in the khöömei and kargyraa singing styles.
