= In Dreams (soundtrack) =

Soundtrack album by Elliot Goldenthal
- Released: October 12th, 1999
- Genre: Classical; Avant-garde; Modernist; Jazz fusion Progressive; Electronica
- Length: 47:27
- Label: Varèse Sarabande, Cat.VSD-6001
- Producer: Matthias Gohl

Elliot Goldenthal chronology
Sphere (1998)	In Dreams (1999)	'Titus (1999)

Professional ratings
Review scores
Source	Rating
Allmusic	4/5 stars
Filmtracks	3/5 stars
Musicfromthemovies	3/5 stars
Moviemusic.com	4/5 stars

The score to the psychological thriller In Dreams, by Elliot Goldenthal, is an avant-garde work filled with his trademark techniques and dissonance. Composed in 1999, and working again with frequent collaborator Neil Jordan, it also features songs by Roy Orbison and The Andrews Sisters.

== The Score ==
Stylistically similar to his score for Heat with the use of dark, at times deliberately off-key, electric guitars layered upon one another (a technique he has referred to as a "guitar orchestra") over string and brass arrangements typical of his style, using Deaf Elk for this purpose and employing the use of a string quartet; also with this score, as in Titus, his use of saxophone (played by Bruce Williamson) is very off-beat, earthy and avant-garde.

The dark mood is off-set with more delicate piano and string pieces; also the use of electronic arrangements (produced by Richard Martinez), something Goldenthal embraced on this score.

The score features three tracks by other artists including one, "Dream Baby", with lyrics by Neil Jordan, vocals by Elizabeth Fraser and music by Goldenthal. The Orchestral music was performed by the London Metropolitan Orchestra.

== Track listing ==
1. Agitato Dolorosa (5:00)
2. Claire's Nocturne (2:38)
3. The Pull of Red (2:08)
4. Appellatron (3:32)
5. Wraith Loops (3:26)
6. Rubber Room Stomp (2:01)
7. Pulled by Red (1:11)
8. Scytheoplicity (3:25)
9. "In Dreams" (2:49) by Roy Orbison
10. Rebecca's Abduction (4:31)
11. Premonition Lento (1:43)
12. While We Sleep (2:36)
13. "Don't Sit Under the Apple Tree (With Anyone Else But Me)" (2:14) by The Andrews Sisters
14. Andante (3:36)
15. Elegy Ostinato (4:07)
16. "Dream Baby" (4:30) by Elizabeth Fraser

== Crew/Credit ==
- Orchestral music composed by Elliot Goldenthal
- Produced by Teese Gohl and Elliot Goldenthal
- Orchestrated by Robert Elhai and Elliot Goldenthal
- Conducted by Jonathan Sheffer and Edward Shearmur
- Performed by the London Metropolitan Orchestra
- Recorded and mixed by Joel Iwataki
- "Deaf Elk" guitars: Page Hamilton, Mark Stewart, Andrew Hawkins, David Reid, Eric Hubel
- Saxophone performed by Bruce Williamson
- Piano performed by Sally Heath
- Electronic music produced by Richard Martinez
