= Loga Ramin Torkian =

Iranian musician (born 1964)

- Born: September 23, 1964 (age 60); Tehran، Iran
- Genres: Trance, Electronica, World
- Occupation: Musician
- Instruments: GuitarViol, Tar, Armenian Saz
- Labels: Six Degrees Records
- Website: myspace.com/logaramintorkian

Loga Ramin Torkian (Persian: لوگا) رامین ترکیان))،(Born: September 23, 1964) is a musician and the co-founder of the groups Axiom of Choice and Niyaz. Both groups incorporate Persian and Middle Eastern themes into their music. Torkian composes music and plays several instruments, including the Iranian tar, the Turkish saz, and the GuitarViol, an electric guitar-like instrument that uses a bow and is adapted from a 14th-century instrument. Several of the lyrics in his songs draw on or include traditional Middle-Eastern prayers, songs or chants. His music has also appeared in several films, such as The Chosen One (1995), America So Beautiful (2001), Plastic Flowers Never Die (2008), and Crossing Over (2009).

== Personal life ==
He is married to singer Azam Ali and they have one son. He previously was married to Yatrikadevi Shah-Rais and was co-owner of the retail store Koan Collection in Los Angeles (which has since closed).

== Discography ==
Solo

- ’’Brink of Absolute’’ (2020)
- Mehraab (2011)
- "Lamentation of Swans" by Azam Ali and Loga R. Torkian (2013)

Axiom of Choice

- Beyond Denial (1995)
- Niya Yesh (2000)
- Unfolding (2002)

Niyaz

- Niyaz (2005)
- Niyaz Remixed (2006)
- Nine Heavens (2008)
- Sumud (2012)
- The Fourth Light (2015)

Filmography

- The Chosen One (1995)
- America So Beautiful (2001)
- Plastic Flowers Never Die (2008)
- Crossing Over (2009)
