= 300 (soundtrack) =

300 (Original Motion Picture Soundtrack)

Soundtrack album by Tyler Bates
- Released: March 6, 2007
- Studio: Abbey Road Studios
- Genre: Film score
- Length: 59:56
- Label: Warner Bros.
- Producer: Tyler Bates

Tyler Bates chronology
Tarzan II (2005)	300 (Original Motion Picture Soundtrack) (2007)	Shooter (2007)

Professional ratings
Review scores
Source	Rating
Filmtracks	1/5 stars
Movie Music UK	1/5 stars
Movie Wave	0/5 stars
ScoreNotes	5/10 stars
SoundtrackNet	3/5 stars
Tracksounds	3.5/5 stars

300: Original Motion Picture Soundtrack is the soundtrack to the 2007 film of the same name by Tyler Bates. The album was released by Warner Bros. Records on March 6, 2007, three days before the film opened for public viewing.

== Production and composition ==
In July 2005, composer Tyler Bates began work on the film, describing the score as having "beautiful themes on the top and large choir," but "tempered with some extreme heaviness." The composer had scored for a test scene that the director wanted to show to Warner Bros. to illustrate the path of the project. Bates said that the score had "a lot of weight and intensity in the low end of the percussion" that Snyder found agreeable to the film. The score was recorded at Abbey Road Studios and features the vocals of Azam Ali (where she implements ethnic wailing). A standard edition and a special edition of the soundtrack containing 25 tracks was released on March 6, 2007, with the special edition containing a 16-page booklet and three two-sided trading cards.

The lyrics sung are in Bulgarian, Greek and Latin. The opening lines of the track "Come and Get Them" are "Ferto! – Parte to!" (φέρτο! – πάρτε το!) translating as "bring it! – take it!". It is said that Leonidas exclaimed Molōn Labe! (Μολὼν Λαβέ!) when asked by Xerxes to surrender their weapons, which is translated into English as "Come and Get Them".

== Track listing ==
All tracks are written by Tyler Bates.

CD
No.	Title	Length
1.	"To Victory"	2:35
2.	"The Agoge"	2:25
3.	"The Wolf"	2:11
4.	"Returns a King"	2:24
5.	"Submission"	2:11
6.	"The Ephors"	1:59
7.	"Cursed by Beauty"	1:42
8.	"What Must a King Do?"	1:06
9.	"Goodbye My Love"	3:23
10.	"No Sleep Tonight"	2:34
11.	"Tree of the Dead"	2:25
12.	"The Hot Gates"	3:00
13.	"Fight in the Shade"	3:18
14.	"Come and Get Them"	2:05
15.	"No Mercy"	2:23
16.	"Immortals Battle"	1:54
17.	"Fever Dream"	2:33
18.	"Xerxes' Tent"	3:21
19.	"Tonight We Dine in Hell"	1:15
20.	"The Council Chamber"	2:35
21.	"Xerxes' Final Offer"	2:39
22.	"A God King Bleeds"	2:17
23.	"Glory"	1:45
24.	"Message for the Queen"	2:32
25.	"Remember Us"	2:56
Total length:		59:56

Collector's Edition bonus tracks
No.	Title	Length
26.	"First Battle Push"	2:57
27.	"One Wild Night"	4:03
28.	"Blood Drunk"	2:04
29.	"To Victory" (Philip Steir's Sacrifice for Sparta Remix)	5:31
Total length:		74:32

== Copyright issues ==
The score was criticized for its similarity to other then-recent soundtracks, including James Horner and Gabriel Yared's work for the film Troy. The heaviest borrowings were said to be from Elliot Goldenthal's 1999 score for Titus. "Remember Us," from 300, is identical in parts to the "Finale" from Titus, and "Returns a King" is similar to the cue "Victorius Titus". On August 3, 2007, Warner Bros. Pictures acknowledged in an official statement:

... a number of the music cues for the score of 300 were, without our knowledge or participation, derived from music composed by Academy Award winning composer Elliot Goldenthal for the motion picture Titus. Warner Bros. Pictures has great respect for Elliot, our longtime collaborator, and is pleased to have amicably resolved this matter.

== Reception ==
Upon its release, the 300 soundtrack received mostly negative reviews from film music reviewers, largely due to the Goldenthal plagiarism. Christian Clemmensen of Filmtracks.com refused to review the album upon its release, later giving the album one star and quoting Bates as saying "I have as much respect for a garbage can lid as I do for the orchestra. Both of them can be entirely useful and important in the scope of a movie, if you look at them the right way." Clemmensen responds "That's a wise statement, but it's completely irrelevant unless you can actually use that garbage can lid in a manner that doesn't break the law.".

The soundtrack debuted at #74 on the Billboard Top 200 and rose to #52 in its second week. It has sold 37,638 copies to date.

== Charts ==
Chart performance
Chart (2007)	Peak position
Canadian Albums (Nielsen SoundScan)	46
French Albums (SNEP)	183
German Albums (Offizielle Top 100)	88
Greek Albums (IFPI)	11
Spanish Albums (Promusicae)	91
Swiss Albums (Schweizer Hitparade)	85
UK Album Downloads (OCC)	27
UK Compilation Albums (OCC)	67
US Billboard 200	52
US Soundtrack Albums (Billboard)	3
