= Greg Ellis (musician) =

American drummer and percussionist

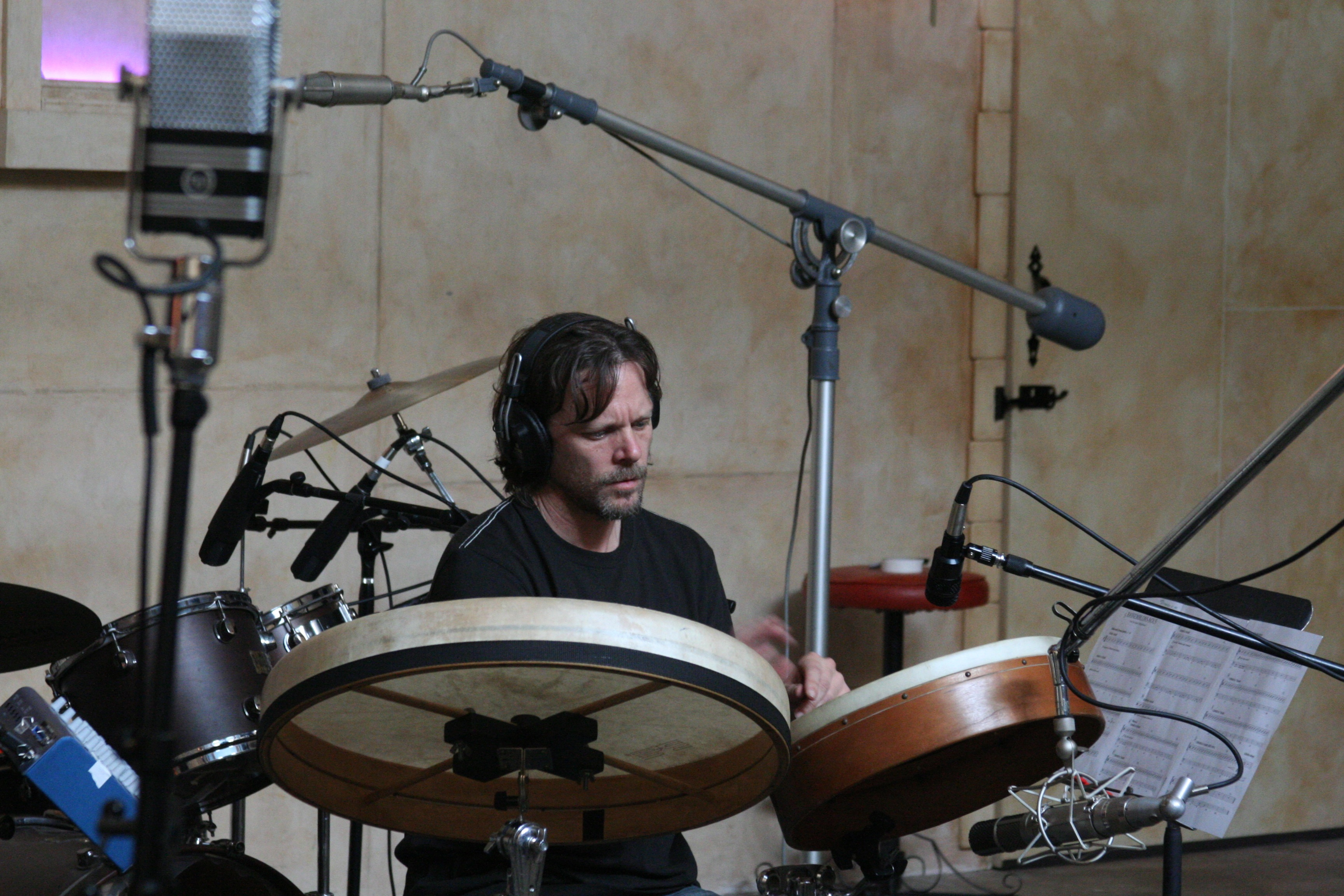
- Ellis in 2008

Background information
- Origin: United States
- Genres: Tribal fusion; world
- Occupation: Musician
- Instruments: Drums; udu; tabla; dumbek; nagara; keyboards
- Formerly of: Vas; Juno Reactor

Greg Ellis is an American drummer and percussionist, known for his work in film and world music. He has performed and recorded with a variety of artists, including Zakir Hussain, Airto Moreira, Mickey Hart, Juno Reactor, Billy Idol, Sonu Nigam, Sussan Deyhim, Bickram Ghosh, Chiwoniso Maraire, and Sugizo.

In 1996, Ellis formed the duo Vas with the Iranian singer Azam Ali. They released four studio albums, before splitting up in 2004. In 2001, Ellis issued his debut solo album, titled Kala Rupa. He is the founder of RhythmPharm, a company through which he sells music he has written for the purpose of sound healing, along with other products.
