= Azam Ali =

Iranian musician (born 1970)

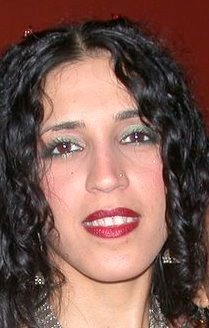
- Ali in 2005

Background information
- Born: Azam Aliafgerad; 3 October 1970 (age 56); Tehran, Iran
- Genres: Rock; folk; folk-pop; new-age; World; Sufi
- Occupations: Musician; songwriter
- Instruments: Vocals; hammered dulcimer; frame drum; riqq; zill; chan chan; guitar; psaltery; bendir
- Labels: Narada; Six Degrees
- Member of: Niyaz
- Formerly of: Vas; Roseland
- Website: azamali.com

Azam Ali (Persian: اعظم علی) is an Iranian musician. She has released music as a solo artist as well as with the bands VAS, Roseland, and Niyaz.

== Biography ==
Born in Tehran on 3 October 1970, Ali spent most of her childhood in Panchgani, India. She and her mother moved to Los Angeles, California, in 1985. Ali studied the santoor under Persian master Manoochehr Sadeghi, which led her to discover her voice.

=== Projects and collaborations ===
In 1996, Ali formed the "alternative world" group Vas with percussionist Greg Ellis after they met a year prior at a concert at UCLA. The project was active until 2004. Ali and her husband, Loga Ramin Torkian, are part of another group, Niyaz, an Iranian acoustic electronic project. Between 2003 and 2007, she formed one half of the duo Roseland, together with American musician and composer Tyler Bates.

In 2005, Ali was featured on Enter the Chicken, a 2005 Buckethead and Friends album, singing the song "Coma" with Serj Tankian.

In 2006, she appeared on Nefes/Breath, an album by Turkish ney player and DJ Mercan Dede, singing the song "Dem."

=== Solo career ===
In 2002, Ali released her first solo album, Portals of Grace. This was followed in 2006 by Elysium for the Brave, which reached No. 10 on Billboard's World Albums chart on 23 September 2006. Ali's third album, From Night to the Edge of Day (2011), is a collection of lullabies inspired by her son. Lamentation of Swans – A Journey Towards Silence (2013), her fourth album, is a joint effort with her husband that began in 2009.

In 2003, she sang the song "Inama Nushif" in the fictional Fremen language for the soundtrack to the Syfy mini-series Frank Herbert's Children of Dune, written by Brian Tyler. In 2006, her vocals were featured in the movie 300. In 2007, she composed the score to the video game Syphon Filter: Logan's Shadow. In 2011, she was heard several times on the soundtrack of Uncharted 3. In 2012, she was the vocalist for Square Enix's Final Fantasy video game tech demo Agni's Philosophy. In 2013, she provided vocals for the soundtrack to the film Thor: The Dark World.

On 31 May 2019, Ali announced her next album, the self-produced Phantoms, along with its first single and music video, "Hope". The next single was the album's title track, which was released on 12 July. The record came out on 13 September.

== Discography ==
=== Solo ===
Studio albums

- Portals of Grace (2002)
- Elysium for the Brave (2006)
- From Night to the Edge of Day (2011)
- Lamentation of Swans – A Journey Towards Silence (2013) [Credited to Azam Ali and Loga R Torkian]
- Phantoms (2019)
- Synesthesia (2025)

Soundtracks

- Syphon Filter: Logan's Shadow (2007)

Other albums

- Green Memories with Shahrokh Yadegari and Keyavash Nourai (2008)
- When We Were Gods with Loga Torkian (2023)

=== with VAS ===
- Sunyata (1997)
- Offerings (1998)
- In the Garden of Souls (2000)
- Feast of Silence (2004)

=== with Niyaz ===
- Niyaz (2005)
- Nine Heavens (2008)
- Sumud (2012)
- Sumud Acoustic EP (2013)
- The Fourth Light (2015)

with Roseland

- Roseland (2007)

=== Contributions ===
- "Form 3", "Form 6" Kala Rupa Explorations in Rhythm (Greg Ellis, 2001)
- "Inama Nushif" Frank Herbert's Children of Dune (2003)
- "Coma" Enter the Chicken (Buckethead and Friends, 2005)
- "Dem" Nefes/Breath (Mercan Dede, 2006)
- "The Cold Black Key" Where's Neil When You Need Him? (2006)
- 300 Original Motion Picture Soundtrack (Tyler Bates, 2007)
- "Nargis" Exilarch (Conjure One, 2010)
- Final Fantasy – Agni's Philosophy (2012)
- Thor: The Dark World (Brian Tyler, 2013)
