= Da Cruz =

- Origin: Brazil, Switzerland
- Genre: World
- Years active: 2005 - present
- Labels: Six Degrees Records; Boom Jah Records
- Members: Mariana Da Cruz; Ane H. Oliver Husmann; Pit Lee
- Website: http://www.dacruzmusic.com

Da Cruz is a Brazilian world music group composed of Mariana Da Cruz, Swiss producer Ane Hebeisen (Ane H.), guitar player Oliver Husmann and drummer Pit Lee. Da Cruz was formed in 2005 when Hebeisen, formerly of the Swiss industrial-electro group Swamp Terrorists, met Da Cruz, a Bossa Nova singer in an Irish pub, in Lisbon while touring Portugal. After moving to Switzerland, Oliver Husmann and former Swamp Terrorists drummer Pit Lee were invited to join and round out the group. Since then, they have released seven albums: Nova Estação in 2007, Corpo Elétrico in 2008, and Sistema Subversiva in 2011, Disco e Progresso in 2014, Eco do Futuro in 2017, Baladas da Luta in 2022 and Som Sistema in 2026.

== Sistema Subversiva ==
On June 28, 2011, Da Cruz released their third album, Sistema Subversiva, which reached #5 on Chart Attack's World/Folk chart on July 5, 2011. "Boom Boom Boom", a featured track from the album, reached #69 on CMJ's Jazzweek World Singles chart on July 14, 2011 and was featured as the song of the day on KEXP's Midday Show on July 4, 2011. Don Yates of KEXP called the album an "edgy fusion of various Brazilian styles with electro, hip hop, synth-punk, Afro-beat, Ethiopian funk and more, with loud buzzing synths and booming bass bringing a gritty urban edge to the bands colorful dance grooves." Ernesto Aguilar of Culture Bully noted that the album was "quite good at times, though hints of potential growth show listeners where this collective could go, Da Cruz make a fascinating entry to a sound that is sure to grow globally in the coming years"

== Members ==
- Mariana Da Cruz - Vocals
- Ane H. - Programming
- Oliver Husmann - Guitar
- Pit Lee - Drums and Percussion

Live support members

- Claudio von Arx - Saxes
- Adrien Oggier - Trumpet
- Nik Hürny - Trumpet
- Christian Sommerhalder - Guitar

== Discography ==
- Nova Estação 1 (2007)
- Nova Estação 2 (2007)
- Corpo Elétrico (2008)
- Sistema Subversiva (2011)
- Disco e Progresso (2014)
- Eco do Futuro (2017)
- Baladas da Luta (2022)
- Som Sistema (2026)
