= Vas (band) =

American world music group

- Origin: Los Angeles, California, US
- Genres: Tribal fusion; world
- Years active: 1996–2004
- Labels: Narada/MCA; Narada/Virgin/EMI
- Past members: Azam Ali; Greg Ellis

Vas was a world music group that consisted of Iranian singer Azam Ali and American percussionist Greg Ellis. Formed in 1996, Vas released four full-length albums and split up in 2004.

== Band members ==
- Azam Ali – vocals, hammered dulcimer, guitar, drums
- Greg Ellis – udu, tabla, dumbek, nagara, cymbals, bells, drums, keyboards

== Discography ==
=== Albums ===
- Sunyata (1997)
- Offerings (1998)
- In the Garden of Souls (2000)
- Feast of Silence (2004)
