= Six Degrees Records =

American independent record label

- Founded: 1996
- Founder: Pat Berry, Bob Duskis
- Country of origin: U.S.
- Location: San Francisco, California
- Official website: sixdegreesrecords.com

Six Degrees Records is an American independent record label noted for its catalog of recordings from international musicians and vocalists.

== History ==
In 1996, former Windham Hill employees Pat Berry and Bob Duskis founded Six Degrees Records with the intention of promoting new trends in world music. Originally affiliated with Island Records, Berry and Duskis achieved their first major success with the release of London-based tabla player Talvin Singh's influential compilation album Anokha – Soundz of the Asian Underground. Although Singh was not the only artist featured on the album, he was marketed as the focal point of the release. In this way, the media acquired a poster child upon which to lavish its attention, enabling album sales to approach 200,000 units.

Beyond its work with the Asian underground, Six Degrees Records has signed and promoted artists from around the world, placing a great emphasis on the promotion of hybrid dance music forms and innovative cross-cultural collaborations. Standout acts include Algerian-born and San Francisco based Cheb i Sabbah, Malians Issa Bagayogo and Vieux Farka Toure, Brazilians Bebel Gilberto and Céu, Egyptian-born and London based Natacha Atlas, and the Iranian Azam Ali. Gilberto's 2000 album Tanto Tempo was a particular highpoint, selling over a million copies and introducing Gilberto, the daughter of renowned musician João Gilberto, to a wider global audience.

== Motto ==
Based in San Francisco, the label operates under the motto, "Everything is closer than you think," encapsulating their aim of introducing global artists to the American market alongside an embrace of the increased accessibility of musical media through digitization. Beyond releasing music in digital formats and pursuing social media marketing opportunities, Berry and Duskis strongly promote the licensing of their artists' music for LGBT film, television and commercial use. Nevertheless, artistic integrity remains a priority, and in a relatively short period of time, the label has developed a significant reputation by emphasizing creativity before commerce.

== Genres ==
Artists under the label make music within a wide range of musical genres, from bossa nova, funk and folk, to electronic music and dubstep.

== Awards and nominations ==
Year	Awards	Category	Recipient	Result
2001	AFIM Indie Award	Soundtrack	Genghis Blues Music from the Motion Picture	Won
2001	AFIM Indie Award	Electronica	Banco de Gaia Igizeh	Won
2002	AFIM Indie Award	Hip-Hop	Michael Franti & Spearhead Stay Human	Won
2010	Latin Grammy	Brazilian Contemporary Pop Album	Céu Vagarosa	Nominated
2012	Latin Grammy	Best Brazilian Contemporary Pop Album	Céu Caravana Sereia Bloom	Nominated
2012	A2IM Libera Awards	Up and Comer of the Year	The Dø	Won
2016	Grammy Awards	Best World Music Album	Zomba Prison Project I Have No Everything Here	Nominated
2016	Grammy Awards	Best Remix Recording	starRo Heavy Star Movin by Silver Lake Chorus	Nominated
2018	Grammy Awards	Best World Music Album	Yiddish Glory The Lost Songs of World War II	Nominated

== Artists ==
- Alice Russell
- Azam Ali
- Ballaké Sissoko
- Banco de Gaia
- Bebel Gilberto
- Ben Neill
- Bob Forrest
- Bombay Dub Orchestra
- Bossacucanova
- Brownout
- Celso Fonseca
- Céu
- Cheb i Sabbah
- Choying Drolma & Steve Tibbetts
- Cibelle
- Curumin
- Da Cruz
- Darol Anger
- Dawn Landes
- DJ Cam
- DJ Spooky
- Dirtwire
- Dom La Nena
- Ekova
- Euphoria
- Gaudi
- Issa Bagayogo
- Jorane
- Karsh Kale
- Kassé Mady Diabaté
- Lenine
- Loga Ramin Torkian
- Meklit
- Michael Franti & Spearhead
- MIDIval Punditz
- Natacha Atlas
- Niyaz
- Ojos de Brujo
- Pacifika
- Patato
- Piers Faccini
- Rob Swift
- Shrift
- Silvana Kane
- Spanish Harlem Orchestra
- Suba
- The Dø
- The Orb
- The Real Tuesday Weld
- Tweaker
- Vieux Farka Touré
- Vincent Segal
- Warren Cuccurullo & Ustad Sultan Khan
- Willy Porter
- Yiddish Glory
- Zomba Prison Project
- Zuco 103

== See also ==
- List of record labels
