= Jurassic Shift =

Studio album by Ozric Tentacles
- Released: 19 April 1993
- Recorded: 1992–93
- Genre: Psychedelic rock, space rock, progressive rock
- Length: 52:51
- Label: Dovetail

Ozric Tentacles chronology
Live Underslunky (1992)	Jurassic Shift (1993)	Vitamin Enhanced (1993)

Professional ratings
Review scores
Source	Rating
Allmusic	4.5/5 stars
Q	4/5 stars

Jurassic Shift is the fourth studio album by English band Ozric Tentacles. It was first released in 1993 on the band's own label on Dovetail Records. In 1998 a re-release came from Snapper Music, with one additional track. The album was released yet again in 2004, this time paired with Erpland in Snapper Music's Recall 2CD series. 2008 saw a remastered two CD/DVD set with extra tracks and live performances, plus a 24-page booklet. This is the final album to feature original bass player Roly Wynne, who left the band during recording of the album.

In a review for AllMusic, Steven McDonald wrote:

The Ozrics are a truly curious bunch in that they have this unerring tendency and uncanny ability to make great scads of progressive and space music that has true heart. There are very few times when one can connect fabulous technical skill with such a strongly emotional core, and never mind the mystical triggers.

— Steven McDonald, Allmusic

== Track listing ==
1. "Sunhair" (Ozric Tentacles) – 5:43
2. "Stretchy" (Ed Wynne / Joie Hinton) – 6:51
3. "Feng Shui" (Ozric Tentacles) – 10:24
4. "Half Light in Thillai" (Ed Wynne) – 5:35
5. "Jurassic Shift" (Ozric Tentacles) – 11:05
6. "Pteranodon" (Ozric Tentacles) – 5:40
7. "Train Oasis" (Ed Wynne) – 2:45
8. "Vita Voom" (Ozric Tentacles) – 4:48
9. "Feng Shui" [Live, included on re-release] (Ozric Tentacles) – 10:55

== Credits ==
- Ed Wynne: Guitars, Koto, Keyboards
- Joie Hinton: Keyboards, Samples, Atmospheres
- Merv Pepler: Drums, Ethnic Percussion, Babble
- John Egan: Flutes, Babble
- Roly Wynne: Bass
- Zia Geelani: Bass
- Marcus C. Diess: Ethnic Percussion
- Generator John: Tambourine

== Charts ==
Weekly chart performance for Jurassic Shift
Chart (1993)	Peak position
European Albums (European Top 100 Albums)	94
UK Albums (Official Charts)	11
