= The Hidden Step =

Studio album by Ozric Tentacles
- Released: 17 October 2000
- Genre: Psychedelic rock, space rock, progressive rock, electronic
- Length: 47:50
- Label: Stretchy

Ozric Tentacles chronology
Swirly Termination (2000)	The Hidden Step (2000)	Pyramidion (2001)

Professional ratings
Review scores
Source	Rating
Allmusic	4/5 stars
DPRP	8/10 stars
Q	3/5 stars

The Hidden Step is the ninth studio album by English band Ozric Tentacles. It was released in 2000 on Stretchy Records. It was their last to fully include bassist Zia Geelani (except for the track "Oakum" on Spirals in Hyperspace) and drummer "Rad" (Conrad Prince). It was also their first not to feature a cover by the artist Blim; the cover art, by guitarist Ed Wynne, features his cat Pixel.

== Track listing ==
1. "Holohedron" – (5:50)
2. "The Hidden Step" – (7:47)
3. "Ashlandi Bol" – (6:04)
4. "Aramanu" – (6:00)
5. "Pixel Dream" – (6:21)
6. "Tight Spin" – (8:45)
7. "Ta Khut" – (7:06)

== Band personnel ==
- Ed Wynne – guitar, synthesizers, sampled sound
- Seaweed (Christopher Lenox-Smith) – keyboards, synthesizers
- John Egan – flute, vocals
- Zia Geelani – bass guitar
- Rad (Conrad Prince) – percussion
