= Technicians of the Sacred (album) =

Studio album by Ozric Tentacles
- Released: 11 May 2015
- Genre: Progressive rock, psytrance, electronica, world
- Length: 89:09
- Label: Snapper Music

Ozric Tentacles chronology
Paper Monkeys (2011)	Technicians of the Sacred (2015)	Space for the Earth (2020)

Professional ratings
Review scores
Source	Rating
AllMusic	3.5/5 stars

Technicians of the Sacred is the fourteenth studio album by English progressive rock band Ozric Tentacles, released on 11 May 2015 by Snapper Music's Madfish label. The album is the band's first double length album since Erpland.

== Track listing ==
=== Disc 1 ===
No.	Title	Length
1.	"The High Pass"	8:23
2.	"Butterfly Garden"	5:04
3.	"Far Memory"	7:10
4.	"Changa Masala"	6:04
5.	"Zingbong"	8:26
6.	"Switchback"	10:11
Total length:		45:18

=== Disc 2 ===
No.	Title	Length
1.	"Epiphlioy"	11:49
2.	"The Unusual Village"	6:20
3.	"Smiling Potion"	7:12
4.	"Rubbing Shoulders with the Absolute"	8:36
5.	"Zenlike Creature"	9:54
Total length:		43:51

== Personnel ==
- Ed Wynne – guitars, synthesizers, programming, production, engineering
- Silas Neptune – keyboards
- Brandi Wynne – bass
- Balázs Szende – drums
- Paul Hankin – percussion

== Charts ==
Chart performance for Technicians of the Sacred
Chart (2015)	Peak position
UK Progressive Albums (Official Charts)	20
UK Independent Albums (Official Charts)	16
