= The Yumyum Tree =

Studio album by Ozric Tentacles
- Released: 27 April 2009
- Recorded: 2006–2008 (Somerset, England); Mooncalf Studios (Wiltshire, England)
- Genres: Psychedelic rock Space rock Progressive rock Electronica
- Length: 53:11
- Label: Snapper Music
- Producer: Ed Wynne

Ozric Tentacles chronology
Sunrise Festival (2008)	The Yumyum Tree (2009)	Paper Monkeys (2011)

Professional ratings
Review scores
Source	Rating
All About Jazz	3.5/5 stars
Allmusic	3.5/5 stars
Hour	4/5 stars
Louder	2.5/5 stars

The Yumyum Tree is the twelfth studio album by the English band Ozric Tentacles, released on 27 April 2009. It is inspired by Lewis Carroll's poem Jabberwocky.

== Track listing ==
No.	Title	Length
1.	"Magick Valley"	6:42
2.	"Oddweird"	6:14
3.	"Mooncalf"	7:41
4.	"Oolong Oolong"	5:54
5.	"Yumyum Tree"	9:08
6.	"Plant Music"	5:28
7.	"Nakuru"	5:39
8.	"San Pedro"	6:21
Total length:		53:11

== Reception ==
Dom Lawson of Louder wrote: "The Yum Yum Tree is probably perceived by its creators as a distinct and unique work within their alarmingly vast catalogue. To the rest of us, regardless of recreational drug intake, recent or otherwise, these eight beautifully played experiments in sonic pupil dilation could easily have been outtakes from any of the band’s countless past albums." Glenn Astarita of All About Jazz stated: "Ozric's music resonates—it's largely about sparkling and multicolored psychedelics, complete with MIDI-vibes and a few ethereal segments, sometimes abetted by notions of weightlessness."

== Credits ==
- All tracks written by Ed Wynne.
- Recorded 2006–2008 in Somerset, England
- Tracks 3, 5 & 8 recorded at Mooncalf Studios, Wiltshire, England
- Mastered by Jas Mitchell at Loud Mastering
- Cover art by Boswell
- Ed Wynne – guitars, synths, programming...
- Brandi Wynne – keyboards, "airy areas" [effects]
- Vinny Shillito – bass guitar
- Roy Brosh – drums
- Dominic Gibbins – darbuka (on Plant Music)
- Special thanks to:
  - Joie Hinton & Mervyn Pepler for their help on tracks 4 & 8
