= Pungent Effulgent =

Studio album by Ozric Tentacles
- Released: February 1989
- Genre: Psychedelic rock; space rock; progressive rock; World music; instrumental rock
- Length: 75:00
- Label: Dovetail Records; Snapper Music
- Producer: Ed Wynne

Ozric Tentacles chronology
The Bits Between the Bits (1989)	Pungent Effulgent (1989)	Erpland (1990)

Professional ratings
Review scores
Source	Rating
Allmusic	4/5 stars

Pungent Effulgent is the debut studio album by British rock band Ozric Tentacles. Released in 1989, it followed the many cassette-only albums they released in the 1980s.

== Track listing ==
All tracks are written by Ozric Tentacles unless otherwise stated

Side one
No.	Title	Writer(s)	Length
1.	"Dissolution (The Clouds Disperse)"		6:15
2.	"O-I"		4:00
3.	"Phalarn Dawn"	Ed Wynne	7:35
4.	"The Domes of G'bal"		4:36
Total length:			22:25

Side two
No.	Title	Length
5.	"Ayurvedic"	10:57
6.	"Kick Muck"	3:53
7.	"Agog in the Ether"	4:06
Total length:		18:55

All tracks are written by Ozric Tentacles unless otherwise stated

CD
No.	Title	Writer(s)	Length
1.	"Dissolution (The Clouds Disperse)"		6:15
2.	"O-I"		4:00
3.	"Phalarn Dawn"	Ed Wynne	7:35
4.	"The Domes of G'bal"		4:36
5.	"Shaping the Pelm"	Ed Wynne	6:09
6.	"Ayurvedic" (edit of Ayurvedism)		10:57
7.	"Kick Muck"		3:53
8.	"Agog in the Ether"		4:06
9.	"Wreltch"	Ed Wynne	8:31
10.	"Ayurvedism"		19:04
Total length:			75:02

== Credits ==
- Ed Wynne – guitar, synthesizer, production
- Mervin Pepler – drums
- Roly Wynne – bass
- Joie Hinton – synthesizer, sampling
- John Egan – flute, voice
- Paul Hankin – percussion
- Nick Van Gelder – drums on "The Domes of G'Bal"
- Generator John – drums on "Wreltch"
- Marcus C. Diess – percussion on "Agog in the Ether"

== Notes ==
The album's first track, "Dissolution", is one of very few songs by Ozric Tentacles to make use of noticeable vocals.

The seventh track, "Kick Muck", is a reference to the dust in the fields at free festivals typical in the '80's. Popular with fans at such open air venues, its name refers to the dance style at front of stage. The song oscillates between periods of intense, high tempo guitar and slower electronic psychedelia, enabling the crowd to recover before the next bout of "kicking muck".
