= Afterswish =

Compilation album by Ozric Tentacles
- Released: 27 January 1992
- Genre: Psychedelic rock, space rock, instrumental rock, progressive rock
- Length: 117:42
- Label: Dovetail Records

Ozric Tentacles chronology
Strangeitude (1991)	Afterswish (1992)	Live Underslunky (1992)

Professional ratings
Review scores
Source	Rating
Allmusic	3/5 stars

Afterswish is a compilation album by Ozric Tentacles, released in 1992 on Dovetail Records. It is a compilation of tracks from their early cassette releases, also featuring three new tracks.

== Track listing ==
=== Disc 1 ===
1. "Guzzard" (from Sliding Gliding Worlds, 1988) – 2:03
2. "Chinatype" (previously unreleased) – 5:33
3. "The Sacred Turf" (from There Is Nothing, 1987) – 3:06
4. "Og-Ha-Be" (from Tantric Obstacles, 1985) – 4:49
5. "Thyroid" (from Erpsongs, 1985) – 4:58
6. "Omnidirectional Bhadra" (from Sliding Gliding Worlds) – 2:55
7. "Afterswish" (from The Bits Between the Bits, 1989) – 2:41
8. "Velmwend" (from Erpsongs) – 4:34
9. "Travelling The Great Circle" (from There Is Nothing) – 4:09
10. "Secret Names" (from The Bits Between the Bits) – 5:28
11. "Soda Water" (from Sliding Gliding Worlds) – 4:09
12. "Fetch Me the Pongmaster" (from Sliding Gliding Worlds) – 6:16
13. "Zaii!" (previously unreleased) – 8:58

=== Disc 2 ===
1. "Abul Hagag" (previously unreleased) – 4:47
2. "It's a Hup Ho World" (from Sliding Gliding Worlds) – 6:20
3. "The Dusty Pouch" (from Sliding Gliding Worlds) – 4:18
4. "Thrashing Breath Texture" (from There Is Nothing) – 3:30
5. "Floating Seeds" (from The Bits Between the Bits) – 5:45
6. "Invisible Carpet" (from There Is Nothing) – 5:24
7. "The Code For Chickendon" (from Sliding Gliding Worlds) – 4:48
8. "Kola B'pep" (from There Is Nothing) – 6:40
9. "Mae Hong Song" (from Sliding Gliding Worlds) – 3:17
10. "Symetricum" (from The Bits Between the Bits) – 4:29
11. "Jabular" (from There Is Nothing) – 3:53
12. "Sliding and Gliding" (from Sliding Gliding Worlds) – 4:52

== Personnel ==
- Ed Wynne: Guitar, Synth
- Gavin Griffiths: Guitar
- Joie Hinton: Synth
- Tom Brooks: Synth
- Steve Everett: Synth
- Roly Wynne: Bass
- Nick Van Gelder: Drums
- Mervin Pepler: Drums
- John Egan: Flutes
- Paul Hankin: Percussions
- Marcus C. Diess: Percussions
