= Spice Doubt =

Live album by Ozric Tentacles
- Released: 29 September 1998
- Genre: Psychedelic rock, space rock, progressive rock
- Length: 77:31
- Label: Snapper Music
- Producer: Milly Yarnell

Ozric Tentacles chronology
Curious Corn (1997)	Spice Doubt (1998)	Floating Seeds Remixed (1999)

Professional ratings
Review scores
Source	Rating
DPRP	9/10 stars

Spice Doubt is a "live-in-the-studio" album by English band Ozric Tentacles. The initial limited-edition release in 1998 featured an unusual plastic covering around the case, containing oil and 2 plastic fish floating inside. It was re-released in 2003 as a digipak CD, but without the green covering.

== Track listing ==
1. "Cat DNA" (Ozric Tentacles) - (8:11)
2. "Eternal Wheel" (Ozric Tentacles) - (9:31)
3. "Sploosh!" (Ozric Tentacles) - (7:04)
4. "Ahu Belahu" (Wynne) - (2:46)
5. "Papyrus" (Egan, Geelaní, Lenox, Wynne) - (6:30)
6. "Oolite Grove and Citadel Jam" (Egan, Geelaní, Lenox, Prince, Wynne) - (10:28)
7. "Oddentity" (Geelaní, Lenox, Prince, Wynne) - (7:22)
8. "Dissolution (The Clouds Disperse)" (Hinton, Pepler, Wynne, Wynne) - (10:08)
9. "Myriapod" (Egan, Geelaní, Hinton, Pepler, Wynne) - (5:48)
10. "Spice Doubt" (Ozric Tentacles) - (9:43)

== Band personnel ==
- Ed Wynne - guitar, synths
- Seaweed (Christopher Lenox-Smith) - synths
- John Egan - flute
- Zia Geelani - bass guitar
- Rad (Conrad Prince) - drums
- Ian Waters - engineer
- Simon Eddie Baker - liner notes

== Notes ==
Spice Doubt was conceived as an early attempt at live-streaming, and was played and recorded live at Sy Klopps Studios in San Francisco, USA on June 7th 1998. Its full title is "Spice Doubt streaming (A Gig in the Ether)".

The track "Spice Doubt" was written specially for the show. A studio version of it called "Space Out" was later featured on Swirly Termination.
