= Pyramidion (album) =

EP by Ozric Tentacles
- Released: 2001
- Genre: Psychedelic rock Progressive rock
- Label: Snapper Music

Ozric Tentacles chronology
Swirly Termination (2000)	Pyramidion (2001)	Spirals in Hyperspace (2004)

Professional ratings
Review scores
Source	Rating
DPRP	8/10 stars

Pyramidion is a 5 track EP by English band Ozric Tentacles. It was initially released in 2001 on Stretchy Records, and later re-issued on Snapper.

== Track listing ==
1. "Pyramidion" - (6:21)
2. "Xingu" (live) - (7:42)
3. "Pixel Dream" (live) - (12:12)
4. "Sultana Detrii" (live) - (9:18)
5. "Aramanu" (live) - (5:50)

== Personnel ==
- Ed Wynne – guitars, synthesizers, samps
- Seaweed (Christopher Lenox-Smith) – synthesizers
- John Egan – flutes
- Zia Geelani – bass
- Johnny Morgan – drums (track 1)
- Rad (Conrad Prince) – drums (tracks 2–5)

== Notes ==
Only the title track on this EP is new. The rest are older tunes that were recorded live at the Boardwalk in Sheffield, England in 2000. The liner notes by Simon "Eddie" Baker say that the live tracks were not planned to be recorded, but Ed's older half-brother and recording wiz John Bennett appeared unexpectedly on the night of the gig, along with his vanload of recording equipment. The quality turned out to be so good that "it would have been criminal not to release them".

Also, this is the last Ozric release to feature drummer Rad.

== Trivia ==
A Pyramidion is the uppermost piece of an Egyptian pyramid.
