= Ictus =

Ictus may refer to:

== Music ==
- Ictus, in music and conducting, the instant when a beat occurs
- Ictus, rhythmic marking in Solesmes editions of chant; see Rhythm in Gregorian chant
- "Ictus", a 1960s song composed by Carla Bley, American jazz composer
- ICTUS Records, independent record label for avant-garde jazz
- ICTUS, a Belgian orchestra specialising in contemporary classical music

== Other uses ==
- Ichthys (also spelled "ictus", "icthus", and "ichthus"), an early Christian religious symbol
- Ictus Theatre, Chile
- Ictus, in poetry, a way of indicating a stressed syllable; see Ictus and breve

== See also ==
- Palaeoapterodytes ictus, an animal species of the early Miocene or late Oligocene
- Nodens Ictus, a British rock band formed in 1986
