= Become the Other =

Studio album by Ozric Tentacles
- Released: November 1995
- Recorded: 1994–1995
- Genre: Psychedelic rock, space rock, progressive rock, jazz fusion, electronic
- Length: 54:45
- Label: Dovetail
- Producer: Seaweed, Ed Wynne, Zia

Ozric Tentacles chronology
Arborescence (1994)	Become the Other (1995)	Curious Corn (1997)

Professional ratings
Review scores
Source	Rating
Allmusic	3/5 stars

Become The Other is the sixth studio album by English band Ozric Tentacles. It was released in 1995, and is the first release from the band after Merv Pepler and Joie Hinton left to form Eat Static. They were replaced by Rad (Conrad Prince) and Seaweed (Christopher Lenox-Smith), respectively. The album peaked at number 80 on the Official Charts.

== Track listing ==
1. "Cat DNA" – 6:31
2. "Ahu Belahu" – 2:53
3. "Ghedengi" – 5:41
4. "Wob Glass" – 7:52
5. "Neurochasm" – 6:47
6. "Become The Other" – 6:25
7. "Vibuthi" – 10:51
8. "Plurnstyle" – 7:48

== The band ==
- Ed Wynne – guitars, synths, samples & scapes
- Christopher "Seaweed" Lenox-Smith – synths & textures
- Zia Geelani – bass & castanets
- John Egan – flutes various
- Conrad "Rad" Prince – drums & such
- Jim O'Roon – percussion on Neurochasm
