= Paper Monkeys =

Studio album by Ozric Tentacles
- Released: 10 October 2011
- Genres: Psychedelic rock, instrumental rock, space rock, psybient, electronica
- Length: 61:16
- Labels: Snapper, Madfish

Ozric Tentacles chronology
The Yumyum Tree (2009)	Paper Monkeys (2011)	Technicians of the Sacred (2015)

Professional ratings
Review scores
Source	Rating
AllMusic	3.5/5 stars

Paper Monkeys is the thirteenth studio album by English psychedelic rock band Ozric Tentacles, released on 10 October 2011 by Snapper Music.

== Track listing ==
All tracks are written by Ed Wynne

No.	Title	Length
1.	"Attack of the Vapours"	5:22
2.	"Lemon Kush"	6:15
3.	"Flying Machines"	6:26
4.	"Knurl"	6:08
5.	"Lost in the Sky"	7:20
6.	"Paper Monkeys"	7:17
7.	"Plowm"	7:52
8.	"Will of the Wisps"	10:43
9.	"Air City"	3:53

== Personnel ==
- Ed Wynne - guitar, synthesizer, programming, production, engineering
- Silas Neptune - keyboards
- Oliver Seagle - drums, percussion
- Brandi Wynne - bass, production, engineering
- Jim Wilson - mastering
