= Curious Corn =

Studio album by Ozric Tentacles
- Released: 1 May 1997
- Genre: Psychedelic rock, space rock, progressive rock, electronic, jazz fusion
- Length: 46:31
- Label: Snapper

Ozric Tentacles chronology
Become the Other (1995)	Curious Corn (1997)	Spice Doubt (1998)

Professional ratings
Review scores
Source	Rating
Allmusic	4/5 stars
DPRP	8/10 stars

Curious Corn is the seventh studio album by English band Ozric Tentacles. It was initially released in 1997 on Madfish (a division of Snapper Music). A remastered version was also released in 2020 on Kscope.

== Track listing ==
No.	Title	Writer(s)	Length
1.	"Spyroid"	Geelani, Wynne	3:47
2.	"Oolite Grove"	Ozric Tentacles	5:57
3.	"Afroclonk"	Ozric Tentacles	8:06
4.	"Curious Corn"	Ozric Tentacles	10:56
5.	"Oddentity"	Prince, Wynne	7:00
6.	"Papyrus"	Egan, Wynne	5:32
7.	"Meander"	Ozric Tentacles	5:12

== Personnel ==
- Ed Wynne – guitars, synths, mists
- Seaweed (Christopher Lenox-Smith) – synths, strands
- John Egan – flute, ney, bansuri
- Rad (Conrad Prince) – drums, spiders
- Zia Geelani – bass, spongebag

== Charts ==
Chart performance for Curious Corn
Chart (1997)	Peak position
UK Independent Albums (Official Charts)	16
