= Strangeitude =

Studio album by Ozric Tentacles
- Released: 19 August 1991
- Genre: Psychedelic rock, space rock, progressive rock
- Length: 51:44
- Label: Dovetail Records; Snapper Music
- Producer: Ed Wynne

Ozric Tentacles chronology
| Erpland (1990) | Strangeitude (1991) | Afterswish (1992) |

Singles from Strangeitude
- 1. "Sploosh!" Released: 29 July 1991

Professional ratings
Review scores
| Source | Rating |
|---|---|
| Allmusic | 4/5 stars |

Strangeitude is the third studio album by British band Ozric Tentacles. It was released in 1991 on Dovetail Records and re-released in 1998 by Snapper Music.

== Track listing ==
1. "White Rhino Tea" (Ozric Tentacles) - 5:55
2. "Sploosh!" (Ed Wynne) - 6:26
3. "Saucers" (Ed Wynne) - 7:32
4. "Strangeitude" (Ozric Tentacles) - 7:32
5. "Bizarre Bazaar" (Ozric Tentacles) - 4:07
6. "Space Between Your Ears" (Ozric Tentacles) - 7:48
7. "Live Throbbe" (Ed Wynne) - 7:16
8. "Weirditude" (Ozric Tentacles) - 5:13 (Re-release bonus track)

== Credits ==
- Ed Wynne: Guitars, Synths, Production
- Roly Wynne: Bass
- John Egan: Flute, Voice (Credited as Eoin Eogan on early releases)
- Joie Hinton: Synths, Bubbles
- Merv Pepler: Drums
- Paul Hankin: Congas on "Sploosh!" and "Live Throbbe"
- John Canham: Engineering

== Notes ==
"Live Throbbe" was recorded at Brixton Academy, London in 1990, and is a live version of "The Throbbe" from Erpland. It was used as the B-side for the "Sploosh!" single.

"Weirditude" first appeared on a free cassette given out at a gig in Kilburn, London on 19 Dec 1991 entitled "The Ozrics Christmas Special Tape".

== Charts ==
Chart performance for Strangeitude
| Chart (1991) | Peak position |
|---|---|
| UK Albums (Official Charts) | 70 |
