= Arborescence =

Arborescence refers to any tree-like structure. It may also refer to:

- Arborescence (graph theory)
- Arborescence (album), a 1994 album by Ozric Tentacles
- Arborescence (novel), a 2025 novel by Rhett Davis
- Arborescence, a 2013 album by Aaron Parks
