= Lotus Unfolding =

Studio album by Ozric Tentacles
- Released: 20 October 2023
- Studios: Blue Bubble, Scotland
- Genres: Progressive rock; psychedelic rock; electronica; world music
- Length: 45:41
- Label: Kscope
- Producers: Ed Wynne, Silas Neptune, Frederick Jude (exec.)

Ozric Tentacles chronology
Space for the Earth (2020)	Lotus Unfolding (2023)	Harmonic Mind (2026)

Singles from Lotus Unfolding
- 1. "Lotus Unfolding" Released: 28 September 2023; 2. "Deep Blue Shade" Released: 18 October 2023

Lotus Unfolding is the sixteenth studio album by English progressive and psychedelic rock band Ozric Tentacles. The album was released on 20 October 2023 through the Kscope label. Written, recorded and produced by frontman Ed Wynne and his son Silas Neptune in Wynne's Blue Bubble studio in Scotland, the album features Neptune on keyboards and synth, Brandi Wynne on bass, and Saskia Maxwell on flute, as well as several other musicians.

== Track listing ==
No.	Title	Length
1.	"Storm in a Teacup"	9:30
2.	"Deep Blue Shade"	5:08
3.	"Lotus Unfolding"	8:10
4.	"Crumplepenny"	9:54
5.	"Green Incantation"	7:35
6.	"Burundi Spaceport"	5:02
Total length:		45:41

== Personnel ==
Ozric Tentacles

- Ed Wynne – guitars, synths, bass guitar, drum programming
- Silas Neptune – keyboards, modular synth
- Brandi Wynne – bass guitar
- Saskia Maxwell – flute

Additional musicians

- Tim Wallander – drums
- Paul Hankin – congas, claypot
- Gre Vanderloo – drum programming, V-Drums, percussion

Additional credits

- Adam Goodlet – mastering
- Kiff Wood – instrument builder, "for building the wonderful acoustic guitar featured on tracks 3 & 4"
- Sally Clark, Steve McKeown – cover, artwork
- Dominic Simpson, Dominozric, Steve Heliczer – photography

== Charts ==
Chart performance for Lotus Unfolding
Chart (2023)	Peak position
Scottish Albums (Official Charts)	27
UK Album Downloads (Official Charts)	39
UK Independent Albums (Official Charts)	13
UK Progressive Albums (Official Charts)	13
UK Rock & Metal Albums (Official Charts)	5
