= Ozric Tentacles =

English instrumental rock band

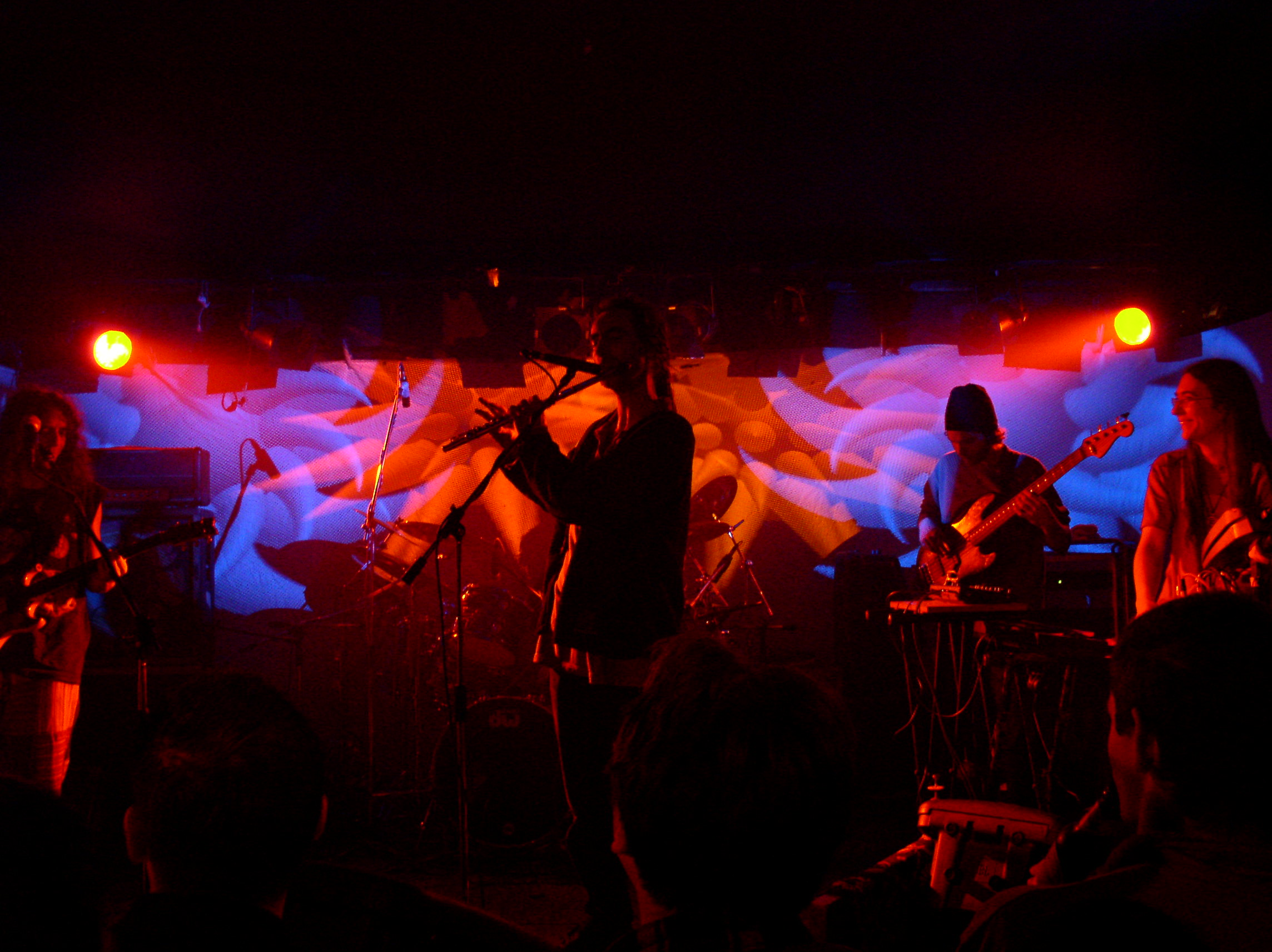
- Ozric Tentacles live in Zagreb, 2004

Background information
- Origin: Somerset, England
- Genres: Psychedelic rock, space rock, progressive rock, electronic rock, instrumental rock
- Years active: 1983–present
- Labels: Kscope, Dovetail, Snapper, Stretchy, Magna Carta, Madfish
- Spinoffs: Eat Static, Nodens Ictus
- Members: Ed Wynne; Silas Neptune; Saskia Maxwell; Corey Wallace; Pat Garvey
- Website: ozrics.com

Ozric Tentacles are an English instrumental rock band, whose music incorporates elements from a diverse range of genres, including psychedelic rock, progressive rock, space rock, jazz fusion, electronic music, dub music, world music and ambient music. Formed in Somerset in 1983, the band have released over 30 albums selling over a million copies worldwide despite never having signed to a major recording label. Throughout many line-up changes over the years, co-founder and guitarist Ed Wynne has remained the only original member of the band. The band is now credited as one of the major influences of the UK festival scene's re-emergence, becoming particularly associated with the Glastonbury Festival and their handmade series of cassette releases, mostly sold at gigs and through a fan club.

== History ==
=== The Cassette Years: 1983–1989 ===
Ozric Tentacles formed at the Stonehenge Free Festival in 1983, where the brothers Ed and Roly Wynne, along with drummer Nick "Tig" Van Gelder, bassist Eddie Myer and keyboardist Joie Hinton, performed as a group originally known as Bolshem People. After playing a six-hour jam session, the group was asked the name of their band, to which Ed Wynne replied, "Ozric Tentacles". This name was one of the ideas, alongside "Malcolm Segments," that had come up in a humorous conversation the band had about possible names for weird or alien breakfast cereals, hence the references to breakfast cereal in several album titles and covers. According to Wynne, "'Ozric' is an old Viking name meaning 'divine energy', and 'tentacles' is a silly word to put on the end" (though in fact the name Osric comes from Old English; its elements mean "god" and "ruler"). The music scene in early-mid-1980s England allowed the band to use the re-emergence of free festivals to spread their music. Underground attention for their style of psychedelic rock—which prominently uses synthesizers, guitars and samplers—allowed the band to surge. Notoriety spread mostly through the circulation of bootleg cassettes in the early years, which were welcomed by the band.

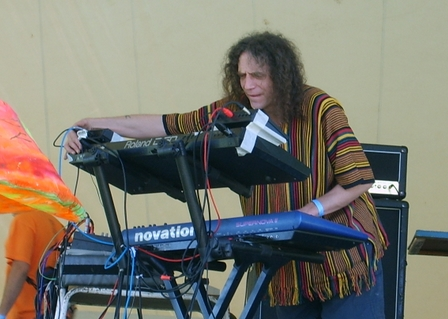
Ed Wynne has remained the only original member of the band.

Gigs were often spontaneous during this period, for the lineup of the Ozrics was fluid. Shows often consisted of whoever was available to perform that night, due to the large number of people within the band. Granted there was power available, the band would often perform for a long time, sometimes until sunrise. It was not uncommon for members of the Ozrics to contribute to other musical collaborations. This practice has stayed with the band since its origination, and has allowed many members to come and go. In 1984, the first major lineup change occurred when second guitarist Gavin Griffiths left the band to form The Ullulators with fellow member Joie on keyboards.

The following year saw the first official cassette release of Erpsongs, which originally did not have track titles. This was possibly due to the album being a collection of songs recorded over three years. The next release, Tantric Obstacles, was released the same year and was intended to be more of an album. These early recordings were sometimes consisting solely of Ed Wynne playing the guitars, bass and synths. All were recorded on a TEAC 4-track reel-to-reel at their attic studio in Rushmere, a converted farmhouse on Wimbledon Common in London. Some tracks on the cassette albums are performed with a drum machine, due to the studio lacking the necessary soundproofing. As a result of two official releases, the band's popularity rose. This led to fans sending in blank cassettes with the intent of them being filled with live or unreleased music. The Ozrics obliged. Eventually, the demand became too much for an independent band to manage. This resulted in the third release, Live Ethereal Cereal, being a live compilation album of concerts between 1985 and 1986.

The band's sound began to adopt a wider repertoire of music towards the end of 1986. This is especially illustrated on the fourth cassette release, There is Nothing. Songs now began to highlight a space rock vibe, with flavours of reggae. This, Wynne says, was not intended, but was the result of seeing the band Here & Now perform live. The addition of more world music (through sampling and performing) was the result of Joie Hinton travelling to India and Ed to Thailand. There is also a noticeable rise in quality on the 1986 release of There is Nothing, due to the purchase of a new 8-track tape machine. This allowed for more synth overdubbing and real drum tracks.

More lineup changes than ever before occurred around this time, most notably the addition of the front-man "Jumping" John Egan and the departure of keyboardist Tom Brooks in 1987. This created a sonic gap for Ed Wynne to fill. Coincidentally, earlier in the year, Ed was busy writing "chill-out music" with his side project Nodens Ictus, so the idea of improving his own synth skills inspired him. Despite more changes and collaborations, they released Sliding Gliding Worlds in 1988, shortly before drummer Tig Velder departed the band and was replaced with 21-year-old Merv Pepler. 1989 saw the last cassette release by the band with The Bits Between the Bits, which was a collection of unreleased recordings between 1985 and 1989. This was a filler album while the band was preparing for its first vinyl release the same year.

=== Dovetail Records: 1989–1997 ===
In 1989, the band started their own label, Dovetail Records, with its first release, Pungent Effulgent. The album was originally released on vinyl, but saw a CD release the following year. The band also began to receive commercial recognition around this time, exemplified by their performance with the singer-songwriter Donovan at the Glastonbury Festival on 18 June 1989. This was followed by Erpland in 1990, a double album. Next year the band reached their first No. 1 recognition in the UK Indie Chart with their single "Sploosh!" from Strangeitude. In approximately 1992, the band decided to create their own recording studio to cut down on the costs of recording an album. The studio, coined "The Mill", was refurbished from an old water mill.

By 1993, Jurassic Shift reached the Top 20 of the UK Albums Chart and No. 1 in the UK Indie Chart, spending three months in the charts.

The band has gone through myriad line-up changes, with Ed Wynne being the only constant presence since the beginning. In early years, many members left to pursue similar musical projects. Nevertheless, throughout the 1990s and 2000s, the band has released albums at a prolific rate, continues to tour extensively and has maintained its identity and trademark sound. The band is famous for their live performances, in which they have long taken an audiovisual approach with elaborate lighting and projections.

In June 2012, the Wynnes' house in Colorado was destroyed by wild fires that had ravaged the area for over a week. The band was on tour at the time. Archived material was destroyed, as was their studio and some instruments. After the fire, the band sought help from fans to help rebuild the archive.

The band toured in 2021–22, as Ozric Electronic, across venues in the UK, with members Ed Wynne and Silas Neptune.

The band (Ed Wynne, Silas Neptune, Saskia Maxwell, Pat Garvey and Corey Wallace) toured with Gong in November–December 2022, then again in 2023, and in November–December 2024 commenced a co-headline tour of the UK with The Orb.

On January 14, 2022, the band released the box set Travelling the Great Circle, featuring all of their albums from Pungent Effulgent to Jurassic Shift, as well as various bonus material. Another box set, Trees of Eternity (1994-2000), followed on December 16, 2022, covering their albums from Arborescence through The Hidden Step, plus bonus material. A third box set was released on November 7, 2025, entitled Through the Magick Valley. This box set covers every album from Live at the Pongmaster's Ball to Technicians of the Sacred, as well as the concert footage from the Pongmaster's Ball, and a documentary.

== Musical style ==
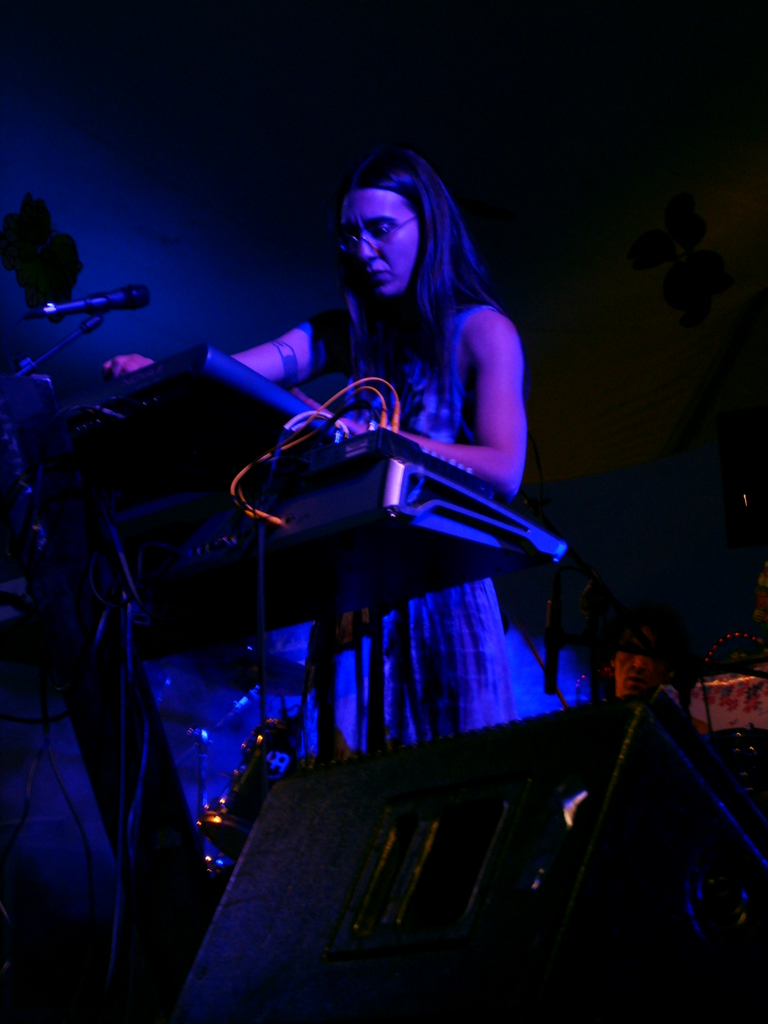
Brandi Wynne joined the band in 2004.

The music of Ozric Tentacles is a combination of driving basslines, keyboards and intricate guitar work, with a sound strongly influenced by Steve Hillage and Gong. Many of the songs incorporate unusual time signatures and Eastern-influenced modes. The band often uses complex arrangements, which include changes in time signature, key and tempo over the course of the track. The arrangements also take influence from funk, jazz fusion, dub, reggae, ambient music, world music and new-age music. These features are frequently mixed with electronic elements, including densely layered arpeggiated synthesizers, pads, synth basslines, effects and programmed drumbeats. Ozric Tentacles also use a wide range of instruments in their performances. In addition to regular rock instruments, woodwinds, ethnic percussion, koto, saz and sitar have appeared throughout their music.

According to a number of interviews over the years, the band does not listen to music as much as they write and record music.

Virtually all of their songs are instrumentals. In Ed Wynne's words, this is because, "I've never really liked vocals. Words always get in the way, make everything too specific. Our music is more about creating moods and giving the listener the chance to get whatever they want out of it. Music is better than singing." Exceptions to this would be "Dissolution" from Pungent Effulgent and "Iscense" from the album Erpland. The band's spare use of vocals came primarily when Jumping John Egan was a member. Occasionally during gigs, he would write poetry and shout it during the song.

== Discography ==
=== Early cassette-only albums ===
- Erpsongs (1985)
- Tantric Obstacles (1985)
- Live Ethereal Cereal (1986)
- There Is Nothing (1986)
- Sliding Gliding Worlds (1988)
- The Bits Between the Bits (1989)

The first six cassette-only albums were self-released before the band began recording and releasing material on CD under the label. These first six albums were released in 1993 as a CD box set called Vitamin Enhanced. The albums were later re-released as a series of three double-disc packages, followed by a re-mastered reissue of the original box in 2014. In 2015, the albums were released as remastered double LPs. In 2021, the six albums were remastered again and reissued with a 48-page book.

=== Studio albums ===
- Pungent Effulgent (1989)
- Erpland (1990)
- Strangeitude (1991)
- Jurassic Shift (1993)
- Arborescence (1994)
- Become the Other (1995)
- Curious Corn (1997)
- Waterfall Cities (1999)
- The Hidden Step (2000)
- Spirals in Hyperspace (2004)
- The Floor's Too Far Away (2006)
- The Yumyum Tree (2009)
- Paper Monkeys (2011)
- Technicians of the Sacred (2015)
- Space for the Earth (2020)
- Lotus Unfolding (2023)
- Harmonic Mind (2026)

=== Live albums ===
- Live Underslunky (1992)
- Spice Doubt (1998)
- Live at the Pongmaster's Ball (2002)
- Sunrise Festival (2008)
- Live in Italy 2010 (2011)
- Live at One World Frome Festival 1997 (2011)
- Live in Oslo (2011)
- Live at the Academy Manchester 1992 (2011)
- Live in Milan 2012 (2012)
- Live in Pordenone, Italy 2013 (2013)

=== Compilation albums ===
- Afterswish (1992)
- Swirly Termination (2000)
- Eternal Wheel (The Best Of) (2004)
- Wasps and Moths – Summer Studio Jams 1995 (2010)
- Dats & Reels Vol. 1 (2011)
- Early Daze Vol. 1 (2011)
- Early Daze Vol. 2 (2011)
- Early Daze Vol. 3 (2011)
- Hidden Jams 2001 (2011)
- Introducing Ozric Tentacles (2013)

=== Box sets ===
- Vitamin Enhanced (1993)
- Travelling the Great Circle: Pungent Effulgent to Jurassic Shift (2022)
- Trees of Eternity (1994-2000) (2022)
- Through the Magick Valley (2025)

=== Remixes album ===
- Floating Seeds Remixed (1999)

=== Singles and EPs ===
| Year | Title | Album |
|---|---|---|
| 1991 | "Sploosh!" | Strangeitude |
| 1999 | "Wob Glass / Neurochasm" | Floating Seeds Remixed |
| 2001 | "Oakum" | Spirals in Hyperspace |
| 2001 | Pyramidion | |
| 2004 | "Chewier (Eat Static Remix)" | Spirals in Hyperspace |
| 2015 | "Xingu (Cosmic Butterfly Remix)" | non-album single |
| 2020 | "Humboldt Currant" | Space for the Earth |
| 2023 | "Lotus Unfolding" | Lotus Unfolding |
| 2023 | "Deep Blue Shade" | Lotus Unfolding |
| 2024 | "Space for the Earth (Charlie Roscoe Remix)" | non-album single |

== Band members ==
=== Current ===
- Ed Wynne – guitars, keyboards, samples, koto, bass, fretless bass, drum programming (1983–present)
- Silas Neptune – keyboards, synthesizer, guitar, samples, saz (2009–present)
- Saskia Maxwell – flute (2021–present)
- Corey Atheleny Wallace – bass (2024–present)
- Pat Garvey – drums, percussion (2023–present)

=== Former ===
- Roly Wynne – bass (1983–1992)
- Joie "Ozrooniculator" Hinton – keyboards, samples, synthesizer (1983–1994)
- Nick "Tig" Van Gelder – drums (1983–1988)
- Eddie Myer – bass (1983–1984)
- Tom "Zorch" Brooks – keyboards (1983–1987)
- Gavin Griffiths – guitar (1983–1984)
- Merv Pepler – drums, percussion (1989–1994)
- Marcus C. Diess – ethnic percussion (1988–1990, 1993)
- Generator John – drums, percussion (1989–1993)
- "Jumping" John Egan – flute (1987–2005)
- Zia Geelani – bass (1992–2004)
- Steve Everitt – bass, keyboards (1993)
- Conrad "Rad" Prince – drums, percussion (1994–2001)
- Chris "Seaweed" Lenox-Smith – keyboards, synthesizer (1994–2004)
- Johnny Morgan – drums (2000)
- Stuart "Schoo" Fisher – drums, percussion (2000–2004)
- Paul Godfrey – bass (2003–2004)
- Steve Hillage – guitar (2004)
- Harry Waters – keyboards (2004)
- Matt "Metro" Shmigelsky – drums (2004–2005)
- Greyum May – bass (2004–2005, 2006)
- Vinny Shillito – Bass (1990–1991, 2007–2009, 2023–2024)
- Alan "Haggis" Haggarty – bass (2005)
- Paul Chousmer – keyboards (2006)
- Oliver Seagle – drums (2006–2013)
- Roy Brosh – drums (2009)
- Paul Hankin – percussion (1985–1991, 2013–present )
- Balázs Szende – drums, percussion (2012–2016, 2020–2022)
- Tim Wallander – drums, percussion (2022–2023)
- Brandi Wynne – bass (2004–2023)

=== Additional information ===
- Roly Wynne was a founding member of Ozric Tentacles, and was a major force in shaping their sound in the beginning. He died in 1999.
- Gavin Griffiths left the early line-up to form alternative rock band The Ullulators.
- Harry Waters, the son of former Pink Floyd bassist Roger Waters, toured with the band in 2004.
- Merv Pepler and Joie Hinton formed Eat Static in 1989. They toured in parallel with Ozric Tentacles for several years until 1994, when the two left the band to pursue Eat Static full-time. Pepler and Hinton have also occasionally collaborated with Ed Wynne as Nodens Ictus.
- Chris "Seaweed" Lenox-Smith was previously a member of the Thunderdogs, Damidge, Moksha, etc. and appeared with Dusters at Dawn at the 1986 Stonehenge Free Festival. He worked on numerous parallel projects, being a permanent member in Ozric Tentacles, Eat Static and ZubZub while collaborating with numerous musicians, including Marco Lippe of Twenty Four Hours.
- Zia Geelani formed electronic music project ZubZub after departing Ozric Tentacles in 2004.
- "Jumping" John Egan is now playing with space-rock project Dream Machine. He has also played with ZubZub as well as his own band Champignon.
- Stuart "Schoo" Fisher was the drummer of Hole and psychedelic rock band Keepers Brew. He is currently running a recording studio.
- Greyum May has a psychedelic project called Keepers Brew with guitarist Stu Brewer.
- Paul Godfrey now plays bass in The Cellar Door Sound.
- Paul Chousmer now plays with Another Green World, Webcore, Zuvuya and Astralasia, and works as a sound engineer. He is also musical director and keyboard player for the Wessex Big Band, and a former lecturer of music at Yeovil College.
- Nick "Tig" Van Gelder played in Jamiroquai in 1992–1993.
- Johnny Morgan is the drummer for Senser, and also played for Moke and Lodestar.

== Miscellaneous ==
The AV-400 MHz NMR machine of the chemistry department of The University of Warwick is nicknamed "Ozric" in honour of the band, allegedly by NMR expert and Ozric Tentacles fan Jon Rourke.

The video game Llamatron, created by video game designer Jeff Minter, has an end-of-level boss named after the band.

Ozric Tentacles have been cited as an influence by The Fierce and the Dead.
