= Arborescence (album) =

Studio album by Ozric Tentacles
- Released: 27 June 1994
- Recorded: 1993–1994
- Genre: Psychedelic rock, space rock, progressive rock
- Length: 49:17
- Label: Dovetail

Ozric Tentacles chronology
Vitamin Enhanced (1993)	Arborescence (1994)	Become the Other (1995)

Professional ratings
Review scores
Source	Rating
AllMusic	4/5 stars
Music Week	4/5 stars
NME	6/10 stars
Q	1/5 stars

Arborescence is the fifth studio album by English band Ozric Tentacles. It was released in 1994 on Dovetail Records. The album was rereleased in 1999 on Snapper Music, this time with sleeve notes by Andy Garibaldi. It is the last album to feature drummer Merv Pepler and keyboardist Joie Hinton as full-time bandmembers, who left to form Eat Static, until the live album Sunrise Festival in 2008.

== Track listing ==
All tracks written by Ozric Tentacles, unless otherwise noted.

1. "Astro Cortex" – 5:22
2. "Yog-Bar-Og" – 9:42
3. "Arborescence" (Ed Wynne, Joie Hinton) – 4:52
4. "Al-Salooq" – 5:02
5. "Dance of the Loomi" – 5:15
6. "Myriapod" – 5:59
7. "There's a Planet Here" – 6:40
8. "Shima Koto" (Ed Wynne) – 6:25

== Personnel ==
- Ed Wynne – guitar, synth
- Joie Hinton – synth
- John Egan – flutes
- Merv Pepler – drums, percussion
- Zia Geelani – bass

== Notes ==
The original LP version had an extra, unlisted track. That LP release (on Dovetail) consisted of two discs, with the above 8 songs spanning the first 3 sides only. While there was no track listed for side 4, there was a short and strange, looped and pitch-shifted, synth sound there anyway. That side also had a different centre circle label, featuring a purple on yellow Erpman (the first 3 sides had standard yellow writing on purple background).

- Track 9: Side 4 (Untitled) – 1:26

== Charts ==
Chart (1994)	Peak position
Scottish Albums (Official Charts)	42
UK Albums (Official Charts)	18
