= Harmonic Mind =

Studio album by Ozric Tentacles
- Released: 18 September 2026
- Studios: Home studios (Scotland, Devon, and Glastonbury)
- Length: 43:46
- Label: Kscope
- Producers: Ed Wynne, Silas Neptune

Ozric Tentacles chronology
| Lotus Unfolding (2023) | Harmonic Mind (2026) |

Harmonic Mind is the seventeenth studio album by British space rock band Ozric Tentacles, released on September 18, 2026, through Kscope.

== Background and recording ==
Named after the geometric structure and harmonic nature of existence, Harmonic Mind follows the band's 2023 release, Lotus Unfolding. The album was recorded in various home studios across Scotland, Devon, and Glastonbury. It continues the band's signature style blending psychedelic grooves, synth-heavy arrangements, and space rock instrumentation.

== Critical reception ==
Writing for Echoes and Dust, Zachary Nathanson noted that Harmonic Mind serves as a strong introduction to the band's style for new listeners, highlighting its cosmic textures and synth-heavy landscapes.

== Track listing ==
All tracks are written by Ed Wynne.

| No. | Title | Length |
|---|---|---|
| 1. | "Guardstones" | 6:40 |
| 2. | "Space Platform" | 5:57 |
| 3. | "Harmonic Mind" | 9:12 |
| 4. | "Malachite" | 7:52 |
| 5. | "Tillamook" | 9:11 |
| 6. | "Sumipad" | 4:54 |
| Total length: | | 43:46 |

== Personnel ==
- Ed Wynne – guitars, synths, programming (all tracks), bass guitar on tracks 1, 4 and 6
- Silas Neptune – keyboards and synths on tracks 1, 3, 4 and 6
- Pat Garvey – live drums on tracks 1, 4 and 5
- Paul Hankin – percussion on tracks 1, 2 and 5
- Corey Wallace – bass guitar on track 2
- Saskia Maxwell – flute on tracks 1 and 6

== Charts ==
Chart performance for Harmonic Mind
| Chart (2026) | Peak position |
|---|---|
| Scottish Albums (Official Charts) | 24 |
| UK Albums Sales (Official Charts) | 25 |
| UK Homegrown (Official Charts) | 18 |
| UK Independent Albums (Official Charts) | 15 |
| UK Rock & Metal Albums (Official Charts) | 4 |
