= Big Men Cry =

Studio album by Banco de Gaia
- Released: July 7, 1997
- Recorded: World Bank
- Genre: Trance
- Label: Mammoth; Planet Dog
- Producer: Toby Marks and Rob Risso

Banco de Gaia chronology
Live at Glastonbury (1996)	Big Men Cry (1997)	The Magical Sounds of Banco de Gaia (1999)

Professional ratings
Review scores
Source	Rating
AllMusic	4.5/5 stars
Pitchfork	8.1/10

Big Men Cry is an album by Banco de Gaia. It was released in 1997 by Mammoth Records and Planet Dog Records.

The album peaked at No. 77 on the UK Albums Chart.

== Critical reception ==
The Washington Post wrote that "anyone who would name a Floyd-sampling, 12-minute track after The Celestine Prophecy is clearly too cosmic for his own good, but Banco's skillful assemblages frequently transcend their cheesier elements."

== Track listing ==
No.	Title	Length
1.	"Drippy"	8:56
2.	"Celestine"	12:37
3.	"Drunk as a Monk"	9:26
4.	"Big Men Cry"	6:09
5.	"Gates Does Windows"	0:36
6.	"One Billion Miles Out"	10:36
7.	"Starstation Earth"	19:37
