= Waterfall Cities =

Studio album by Ozric Tentacles
- Released: 6 July 1999
- Genre: Psychedelic rock, space rock, progressive rock, electronic, jazz fusion
- Length: 57:29
- Label: Stretchy

Ozric Tentacles chronology
Floating Seeds Remixed (1999)	Waterfall Cities (1999)	Swirly Termination (2000)

Professional ratings
Review scores
Source	Rating
Allmusic	3/5 stars
DPRP	7/10 stars
Q	3/5 stars

Waterfall Cities is the eighth studio album by English band Ozric Tentacles. It was initially released in 1999 on Stretchy Records. A remastered version was also released in 2020 on Kscope.

== Track listing ==
1. "Coily" (Ozric Tentacles) – 7:19
2. "Xingu" (Wynne, Seaweed, Geelani) – 7:27
3. "Waterfall City" (Wynne) – 11:03
4. "Ch'ai?" (Wynne, Seaweed, Geelani) – 5:03
5. "Spiralmind" (Wynne, Ozric Tentacles, Geelani) – 11:41
6. "Sultana Detrii" (Ozric Tentacles) – 9:18
7. "Aura Borealis" (Wynne) – 5:40

== Band personnel ==
- Ed Wynne – guitar, synthesizers
- Seaweed (Christopher Lenox-Smith) – synthesizers
- John Egan – flute
- Zia Geelani – bass guitar
- Rad (Conrad Prince) – drums

== Notes ==
Like previous studio albums by the band, Waterfall Cities was recorded at guitarist Ed Wynne's home studio, The Mill, and features a cover by the artist Blim.
