= Space for the Earth =

Studio album by Ozric Tentacles
- Released: 9 October 2020
- Recorded: 2019–2020
- Studio: Blue Bubble, Scotland
- Genre: Progressive rock; psychedelic rock; electronica; world music
- Length: 47:25
- Label: Kscope
- Producer: Ed Wynne

Ozric Tentacles chronology
| Technicians of the Sacred (2015) | Space for the Earth (2020) | Lotus Unfolding (2023) |

Singles from Space for the Earth
- 1. "Humboldt Currant" Released: 20 June 2020

Professional ratings
Review scores
| Source | Rating |
|---|---|
| The Arts Desk | 2/5 stars |

Space for the Earth is the fifteenth studio album by English progressive and psychedelic rock band Ozric Tentacles. The album was released on 9 October 2020 through the Kscope label.

== Background ==
Written, recorded and produced by frontman Ed Wynne in his Blue Bubble studio in Scotland, the album features his son Silas Neptune on keyboards and Balázs Szende on drums, as well as several additional musicians many of which are former Ozric Tentacles members. The album was officially announced on 22 July 2020 followed by the release of the single "Humboldt Currant".

== The Tour That Didn't Happen Edition ==
An expanded version of the album, subtitled "The Tour That Didn't Happen Edition", was released on 3 September 2021. It included a 33-minute bonus track entitled "Six Worlds... (An Unusual Journey)".

== Track listing ==
| No. | Title | Length |
|---|---|---|
| 1. | "Stripey Clouds" | 6:37 |
| 2. | "Blooperdome" | 5:43 |
| 3. | "Humboldt Currant" | 8:58 |
| 4. | "Popscape" | 4:51 |
| 5. | "Climbing Plants" | 7:05 |
| 6. | "Space for the Earth" | 7:36 |
| 7. | "Harmonic Steps" | 6:35 |
| Total length: | | 47:25 |

Space for the Earth (The Tour That Didn't Happen Edition)
| No. | Title | Length |
|---|---|---|
| 1. | "Stripey Clouds" | 6:37 |
| 2. | "Blooperdome" | 5:43 |
| 3. | "Humboldt Currant" | 8:58 |
| 4. | "Popscape" | 4:51 |
| 5. | "Climbing Plants" | 7:05 |
| 6. | "Space for the Earth" | 7:36 |
| 7. | "Harmonic Steps" | 6:35 |
| 8. | "Six Worlds... (An Unusual Journey)" | 33:34 |
| Total length: | | 80:59 |

== Personnel ==
Ozric Tentacles

- Ed Wynne – guitars, bass, keyboards, programming, engineering
- Silas Neptune – keyboards, synthesizer
- Balázs Szende – drums

Additional musicians

- John Egan – kaval on "Space for the Earth"
- Nick Van Gelder – drums on "Popscape"
- Gregoor "Gracerooms" Van Der Loo – synthesizer on "Humboldt Currant"
- Paul Hankin – percussion on "Stripey Clouds" and "Climbing Plants"
- Joie Hinton – keyboards on "Popscape"

== Charts ==
Chart performance for Space for the Earth
| Chart (2020) | Peak position |
|---|---|
| Scottish Albums (Official Charts) | 43 |
| UK Album Downloads (Official Charts) | 55 |
| UK Independent Albums (Official Charts) | 9 |
| UK Progressive Albums (Official Charts) | 4 |
| UK Rock & Metal Albums (Official Charts) | 6 |
