= Spirals in Hyperspace =

Studio album by Ozric Tentacles
- Released: 16 March 2004
- Genre: Psychedelic rock Space rock Progressive rock Electronic; Jazz fusion
- Length: 69:36
- Label: Magna Carta

Ozric Tentacles chronology
| Pyramidion (2001) | Spirals in Hyperspace (2004) | Eternal Wheel (The Best Of) (2004) |

Singles from Spirals in Hyperspace
- 1. "Oakum" Released: 2001; 2. "Chewier (Eat Static Remix)" Released: 24 June 2004

Professional ratings
Review scores
| Source | Rating |
|---|---|
| Allmusic | 3/5 stars |
| DPRP | 8/10 stars |

Spirals in Hyperspace is the tenth studio album by English band Ozric Tentacles. It was released in 2004 on Magna Carta Records.

== Track listing ==
1. "Chewier" (Ozric Tentacles) – 5:26
2. "Spirals in Hyperspace" (Ed Wynne) – 9:51
3. "Slinky" (Ed Wynne) – 8:39
4. "Toka Tola" (Ed Wynne) – 7:46
5. "Plasmoid" (Ed Wynne) – 5:17
6. "Oakum" (Ozric Tentacles) – 9:03
7. "Akasha" (Ed Wynne) – 7:27
8. "Psychic Chasm" (Ed Wynne, Merv Pepler) – 8:44
9. "Zoemetra" (Ozric Tentacles) – 7:23
10. "Chewier (Eat Static Remix)" (Streaming bonus track) (Ozric Tentacles) – 8:48

== Personnel ==
- Ed Wynne – guitar, keyboards, programming
- Schoo (Stuart Fisher) – drums
- Seaweed – synthesizer
- John Egan – flute
- Zia Geelani – bass
- Merv Pepler (Eat Static) – drums, programming, samples
- Brandi Wynne – bass
- Steve Hillage & Miquette Giraudy (Gong, System 7) – guitar, synthesizers
