= Memories Dreams Reflections =

Studio album by Banco de Gaia
- Released: September 22, 2009
- Genre: Electronic
- Length: 140:20
- Label: Disco Gecko
- Producer: Toby Marks

Banco de Gaia chronology
Farewell Ferengistan (2006)	Memories Dreams Reflections (2009)	Apollo (2013)

Professional ratings
Review scores
Source	Rating
Allmusic	3.5/5 stars

Memories Dreams Reflections is an album by Banco de Gaia. It was released on September 22, 2009 on Disco Gecko.

== Track listing ==
All songs written and composed by Toby Marks, except where noted.

The lyrics on "Spirit of the Age" are spoken by newsreader and continuity announcer Neil Sleat. Maya Preece sings the lyrics on "Starless" and "Tempra".

Disc one
No.	Title	Writer(s)	Length
1.	"Spirit of the Age" (Hawkwind cover)	Dave Brock, Robert Calvert	7:16
2.	"Starless" (King Crimson cover)	Bill Bruford, David Cross, John Wetton, Robert Fripp	11:19
3.	"Echoes" (Pink Floyd cover)	David Gilmour, Nick Mason, Richard Wright, Roger Waters	22:23
4.	"Soufie (Now That's What I Call 2009)"		8:43
5.	"Tempra"		7:19
6.	"Terra Om"		5:34

Disc two
No.	Title	Length
7.	"Analogique (Live)"	6:50
8.	"Indecision (Live)"	6:54
9.	"Soufie (Blue mix Live)"	7:23
10.	"Qurna (Live)"	8:58
11.	"China (Live)"	7:23
12.	"Celestine (Live)"	11:49
13.	"How Much Reality Can You Take? (Live)"	6:35
14.	"No Rain (Live)"	7:38
15.	"Drunk As A Monk (Live)"	7:08
16.	"Last Train to Lhasa (Live)"	7:07
