= Swirly Termination =

Studio album by Ozric Tentacles
- Released: 20 June 2000
- Genre: Psychedelic rock Progressive rock Electronic; World music
- Label: Madfish

Ozric Tentacles chronology
Waterfall Cities (1999)	Swirly Termination (2000)	The Hidden Step (2000)

Swirly Termination is a compilation album of previously unreleased material by British band Ozric Tentacles. It was initially released in 2000 on Madfish (a division of Snapper Music). The band had earlier fallen out with the label and as such had no involvement with the album's title, artwork, or promotion.

== Track listing ==
All tracks written by Ozric Tentacles.

1. "Steep" – 3:10
2. "Space Out" – 8:28
3. "Pyoing" – 4:30
4. "Far Dreaming" – 5:24
5. "Waldorfdub" – 6:13
6. "Kick 98" – 6:03
7. "Yoy Mandala" – 11:52

== Personnel ==
- Ed Wynne - guitar, synths
- John Egan - flute, vocals
- Zia Geelani - bass
- Joie Hinton - synths (tracks 3 & 5)
- Merv Pepler - drums (tracks 3 & 5)
- Seaweed (Christopher Lenox-Smith) - synths (tracks 2, 4, & 7)
- Rad (Conrad Prince) - drums (tracks 2, 4, & 7)

== Notes ==
The re-issue in 2003 (on Snapper Classics) contained the following liner notes by Simon "Eddie" Baker:

The mystery and chaos that surrounded the original release of this album will go down as one of the stranger episodes in the history of Ozric Tentacles. Without going into too much of the rather messy details preceding this release, the band were asked to deliver one more studio album to their record company before striking out with their own record label, Stretchy Records, the second Ozric-owned set up after the collapse of Dovetail.

In fact, the clue is in the title of the album, chosen by the label rather than the band, which clearly illustrated the problems both parties were experiencing at the time. Indeed, even the sleeve was designed and produced by the label with no involvement from any band members, who didn't get to see it until it was on the shop shelves. Because of these strained relationships, the recordings that were eventually delivered were effectively a series of rare, previously unreleased material dating back to 1992, and some new mixes of previously released tracks.

To the fans at the time, the "new" studio album must have sounded a little fractured and somewhat chaotic compared to previous studio recordings. Now, with the basic story told here, the album can be appreciated for what it is - an interesting anomaly in the band's catalogue, but an essential one for any fan, being that it is effectively a "clearing-out" of unused material that had been lying around in Ed's studio. A latter day "Bits Between The Bits", if you like. However, this shouldn't deter anyone from buying this album - many fans agree that it represents some the best material the band have released. To think then that if the problems hadn't arisen at the time, this material might never have seen the light of day!

So onto the album itself, which begins with "Steep" - a track Ed recorded on his own back in 1992, after having recently moved into the Mill with his new 24 track studio. Steep was a track recorded to test the capabilities of the new desk, which must have passed with flying colours as the production here is crystal and makes for a blissful opener.

"Space Out" is the studio version of "Spice Doubt", originally featured on the live internet-broadcast album of the same name and the most recent recording on this album, recorded at Pilgrim Cottage in 1998.

"Pyoing" is the rather aptly named third track. This was originally the end part of "Yog-Bar-Og" (and therefore features previous drummer Merv and synth player Joie) from the Arborescence album, a track that was already nearly ten minutes long without this extra section. The story goes that "Yog.." was recorded after a particularly heavy "psychedelic" evening and simply went too mad at the end for this section to be included! Luckily it was saved and is now featured here in all its mad glory. "Waldorf Dub" too is from the same time and features some nice deep dubby bass lines from Zia.

"Far Dreaming" and "Yoy Mandala" were from one of the many jam sessions recorded at the Mill with Rad and Seaweed, who replaced the aforementioned Merv and Joie. Spiced up and rearranged by Ed, "Yoy.." in particular is a sparkling oasis, with Eastern vocals and a beautiful bit of soloing from Ed himself. Which leaves "Kick 98", Ed's own remix of Kick Muck recorded after hearing some of the results of the remix album "Floating Seeds".

So there you go. It's a relief to finally tell the story of this release as it adds so much to the recordings. I hope that now everyone will be able to listen to these tracks with new ears and have a better appreciation of how they came about. It also makes me wonder what other undiscovered gems Ed might have lying around....!

Simon Eddie Baker, 2003
