= Maya (Banco de Gaia album) =

Studio album by Banco de Gaia
- Released: 28 February 1994
- Genre: Trance
- Length: 72:35 min.
- Label: Mammoth Records/Planet Dog Records

Banco de Gaia chronology
Maya (1994)	Last Train to Lhasa (1995)

Professional ratings
Review scores
Source	Rating
AllMusic	2.5/5 stars

Maya is the debut album by electronic artist Toby Marks (Banco de Gaia).

== Track listing ==
No.	Title	Length
1.	"Heliopolis"	7:25
2.	"Mafich Arabi"	8:02
3.	"Sunspot"	6:58
4.	"Gamelah" (Dub 3)	6:37
5.	"Qurna" (Mister Christian on the Decks)	9:19
6.	"Sheesha"	7:42
7.	"Lai Lah" (V1.∞)	7:30
8.	"Shanti" (Red with White Spots Edit)	11:12
9.	"Maya"	7:49

== Special Edition (2011 Digital Release) ==
No.	Title	Length
10.	"Heliopolis" (Liquid Light Remix)	7:59
11.	"Shanti" (Soupdragon Mix)	7:55
12.	"Qurna" (Live)	8:58

== 20th Anniversary Edition (2014) ==
3xCD, limited numbered edition of 1500. All tracks mastered/remastered by Toby Marks, November 2013.

CD 2
No.	Title	Length
1.	"Heliopolis" (Aetherial Mix)	6:24
2.	"Mafich Arabi" (Original Demo)	8:29
3.	"Sunspot" (Unpeeled Mix)	7:17
4.	"Gamelah" (Live at Ocillate 1994)	7:30
5.	"Qurna" (Livemix #2-4 Edit)	7:02
6.	"Sheesha" (Green Tractor Mix)	8:20
7.	"Lai Lah" (Marine Mix)	8:45
8.	"Shanti" (Red With White Spots Original Master)	22:48
Total length:		76:36

CD 3
No.	Title	Length
1.	"Heliopolis" (Veloce Mix)	5:31
2.	"Mafich Arabi" (Temple Hedz Remix)	6:23
3.	"Sunspot" (100th Monkey + Mr Noisy Return to Qurna Mix)	6:15
4.	"Gamelah" (Dub 1)	6:35
5.	"Qurna" (Hadji Ali's Birthday Mix)	7:10
6.	"Data Inadequate" (Live at Megadog 1993)	7:56
7.	"Lai Lah" (Eat Static Kitchen Sink Remix)	8:13
8.	"Shanti" (Live in a Field in Oxford 1993)	8:36
9.	"Soufie" (Blue Mix Original)	7:50
Total length:		64:28
