= Nodens Ictus =

- Origin: London, England
- Genres: Progressive electronic, ambient
- Years active: 1986-present
- Label: Snapper
- Spinoff of: Ozric Tentacles
- Members: Ed Wynne; Joie Hinton; Merv Pepler; Silas Neptune; MantisMash
- Website: https://www.nodensictus.com/

Nodens Ictus are a British electronic music band formed in 1986 as a spinoff of British instrumental rock band Ozric Tentacles.

== History ==
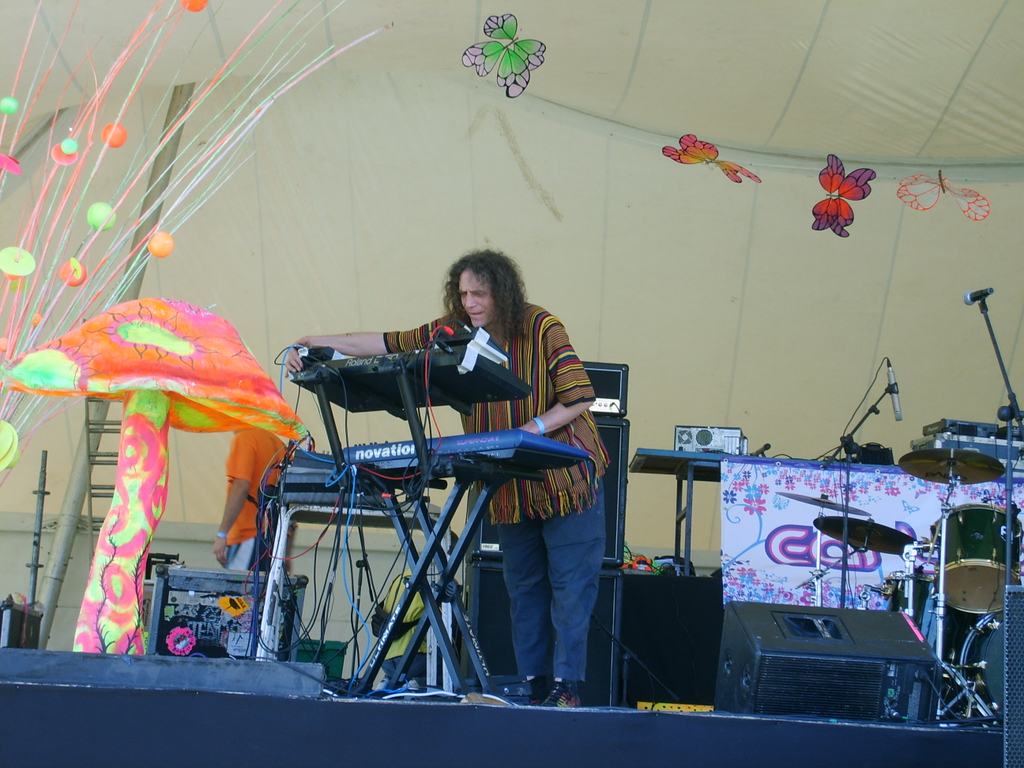
Ed Wynne in 2007

Nodens Ictus began life in 1986 when Ozric Tentacles guitarist Ed Wynne and keyboardist Joie Hinton were asked by the promoters of the Crypt club in Deptford, South London, to produce an ambient set for the club's "chillout" room.

Essentially Ozric Tentacles minus the guitar and rhythm section, Nodens Ictus explored ethereal, Tangerine Dream-like soundscapes using synths and samples, in contrast to the driving space-rock which characterised the sound of parent band. The limited-run, independent cassette-only album The Grove of Selves was issued in 1987 - sold initially at gigs and by mail order, it has subsequently become a rare and sought-after item of Ozric memorabilia.

Existing as a side-project only, Nodens Ictus played semi-frequently throughout the late '80s and early '90s, often as a support act at Ozric shows. The band occasionally ventured into electronica/dance territory following the addition of Ozric drummer Merv Pepler to the lineup, until being put on the backburner for nearly a decade as Wynne focused on the increasingly commercially successful Ozrics. Pepler and Hinton meanwhile concentrated on their techno-trance act Eat Static, which had become successful enough in its own right for them to leave the Ozrics permanently in 1994.

Nodens Ictus returned in 2000 with the release of Spacelines, a collection of old and new studio tracks along with a handful of live cuts dating back as far as 1988. Released on the Ozrics' own Stretchy Records label, the album generated reasonable interest, and Nodens Ictus soon returned to the live arena, again as an occasional support act at Ozric gigs, most notably at their "Pongmaster's Ball" extravaganzas held in London in 2002, 2004 and 2006. An appearance at the Glastonbury Festival was made in 2003, and Nodens Ictus continued with a pair of small-scale headline shows in Exeter and London in 2005.

2007 saw the band play at the Solfest in Cumbria, alongside Mixmaster Morris and System 7.

MantisMash joined the band as a touring member in 2014. Wynne's son, Silas Neptune, joined the band as a full time member in 2017.

Nodens Ictus released their third album, The Cozmic Key, on 10 December 2017.

The double CD Live at Kozfest 2018 was released in April 2019, as performed by Ed Wynne and Gre Vanderloo of Gracerooms. (They later collaborated on a studio album Floating through the Tumbliverse, but which was released under their own names.)

== Band members ==
=== Current members ===
- Ed Wynne - guitars, synthesizers
- Silas Neptune - synthesizers

=== Previous members ===
- Joie Hinton - synthesizers
- Merv Pepler - synthesizers

=== Touring members ===
- Gre Vanderloo - synthesizers
- MantisMash - synthesizers, mixing

== Discography ==
=== Albums ===
- The Grove of Selves (1987)
- Spacelines (2000)
- The Cozmic Key (2017)
- Kozfest Live (2018)

=== Known "bootleg" recordings ===
- Club Dog 1988
- Angel Centre, Tonbridge 1989 (26/02/89)
- Club Dog 1989 (02/06/89)
- Scala Cinema, London 1989
- Live 1990
- Brixton Fridge 1991 (07/07/91)
- The Empire, Shepherds Bush, London 29-03-02 (aka Live at The Pongmaster's Ball)
- Live Phoenix Arts Centre 16-01-03

Note: There is a collection of recordings circulating on the internet called "climbing trees and waterfalls" (CTAW), which many people erroneously believe to have been recorded by Nodens Ictus. The CTAW recordings were in fact created by a collection of musicians from the Stoke-on-Trent area in the UK. Details are sketchy but information on early copies of the CTAW recordings list the band members as Mark - Guitar & synth, Will - Drum programming, sampling & mixing and Lance - Sampling, Occasional vocals. Definitely nothing whatsoever to do with Nodens Ictus.
