= Erpland =

1990 album by British band Ozric Tentacles

Studio album by Ozric Tentacles
- Released: 25 June 1990
- Recorded: Foel Studios, Powys, Wales; Rushmere, London
- Genres: Psychedelic rock, space rock, progressive rock
- Length: 73:43
- Label: Dovetail Records
- Producer: Ed Wynne

Ozric Tentacles chronology
Pungent Effulgent (1989)	Erpland (1990)	Strangeitude (1991)

Professional ratings
Review scores
Source	Rating
Allmusic	4.5/5 stars
DPRP	(8.25/10)

Erpland is the second studio album by British psychedelic rock band Ozric Tentacles. It was originally released on 25 June 1990 on Dovetail Records, with a digitally remastered CD/DVD release on 6 February 2017 through Snapper Music's Madfish label.

== Track listing ==
No.	Title	Writer(s)	Length
1.	"Eternal Wheel"	Ed Wynne, Mervin Pepler	8:20
2.	"Toltec Spring"	Ed Wynne, Paul Hankin, John Egan	3:03
3.	"Tidal Convergence"	Ozric Tentacles	7:14
4.	"Sunscape"	Ozric Tentacles	4:02
5.	"Mysticum Arabicola"	Ed Wynne	9:15
6.	"Crackerblocks"	Ed Wynne	5:40
7.	"The Throbbe"	Ed Wynne	6:22
8.	"Erpland"	Ed Wynne	5:32
9.	"Valley of a Thousand Thoughts"	Ed Wynne, Steve Everett	6:32
10.	"Snakepit"	Ed Wynne, Mervin Pepler	3:18
11.	"Iscence"	Roland Wynne, Mervin Pepler, John Egan	4:38
12.	"A Gift of Wings"	Ed Wynne	9:47
Total length:			73:43

== Live at the Fridge DVD ==
The remastered version of Erpland contains a live DVD of the band playing at The Fridge in Brixton, UK on 19 May 1991. The original tapes had been lost for ten years, despite bootleg VHS copies—with the appearance of an official release—in circulation. The original tapes were rediscovered in 2001.

No.	Title	Length
1.	"Space Jam"	10:25
2.	"Og Ha Be"	12:23
3.	"Erpland"	6:45
4.	"Snake Pit"	3:31
5.	"Dissolution"	17:07
6.	"Sunscape"	9:30
7.	"Obscure Jazz Thing"	6:06
8.	"The Throbbe"	11:24
9.	"Sniffing Dog"	11:25
10.	"Aum Riff Jam"	9:52
Total length:		1:39:22

== Credits ==
- Ed Wynne – guitar, synthesizers, production
- Paul Hankin – percussion
- Mervin Pepler – drums
- John Egan – flute, voice
- Roly Wynne – bass
- Joie Hinton – synthesizer, sampling
- Marcus C. Diess – ethnic percussion
- Tom Brooks – reggae bubbles
- Generator John – tea, tambourine
- Steve Everitt – sampling

== Notes ==
"Iscence" is one of very few songs by Ozric Tentacles to make use of noticeable vocals.

A live version of "The Throbbe", entitled "Live Throbbe", appears on Strangeitude and on the "Sploosh!" single.

The owner of the studio at which the album was recorded allegedly told the band, "Right, you know how the studio works. Here's the keys, I'll see you in a few days."

The last track of the album, A Gift of Wings, was written and recorded whilst the band was under the influence of psilocybin mushrooms. Ed Wynne claims most of the album was recorded this way.
