= TimeShard =

Timeshard were a British electronic dance music act, who came to prominence during the Second Summer of Love in 1989. Composed of members Gobber, Psi and Steven Angstrom, the band became known as one of the UK's first "live acid house" acts.

== Career ==
The band's early sound incorporated elements of ethno-techno, trance, and dub, featuring analogue synthesizers, sequencers and drum machines overlaid with glissando guitars and an electric sitar. Their initial success came on the UK's underground free festival circuit, which attracted acid house fans seeking dance music events outside of mainstream club culture, which had yet to develop the 'superclub' model exemplified by Cream and Fabric.

In February 1994 Timeshard were receiving positive reviews, and were said to have three record labels seeking to sign them. In the same month they were featured on BBC Radio 1, with a session on John Peel's show, where they performed "God Says No To Tomorrow", "Oracle", and "Cosmic Carrot (Parts 1 & 2)".

After 1996, the band's career suffered as the 1994 Criminal Justice Bill killed many venues, and their record company Planet Dog experienced financial difficulties, leading them to attempt to distribute their music online via MP3 files in a deal with webmusic distribution pioneers eMusic.

== Releases ==
=== EPs ===
- Zero (Planet Dog 1995)

=== Albums ===
- Who Pilots The Flying Saucers? (Self Released Cassette only 1991)
- Hypoborean Dome Temples Of Apollo (Self Released Recorded Live for "The Late World Noise" 1992)
- Crystal Oscillations (Planet Dog 1994)
- Hunab Ku (Planet Dog 1996)
- Live (Neo)
- The Planet Dog Years (Planet Dog, 3xCD, 2022)
