= 10 Years (Banco de Gaia album) =

Greatest hits album by Banco de Gaia
- Released: 2002
- Recorded: 1992–2002
- Genre: Ambient, techno
- Length: 2:35:58
- Label: Disco Gecko
- Producer: Toby Marks, Andy Guthrie, Rob Risso

Banco de Gaia chronology
Igizeh (2000)	10 Years (2002)	You Are Here (2004)

Professional ratings
Review scores
Source	Rating
Allmusic	4/5 stars

10 Years is a two-disc "best of" album by Banco de Gaia. It was released in 2002.

All the songs are segued into a continuous mix, resulting in each song's track time being shorter than its original version.

== Track listing ==
All tracks are written by Toby Marks, except where noted

Disc One
No.	Title	Length
1.	"Heliopolis" (Redwood Mix)	6:15
2.	"Kincajou"	6:13
3.	"Drippy"	6:49
4.	"Last Train to Lhasa"	11:14
5.	"How Much Reality Can You Take?" (Jack Dangers Mix)	5:33
6.	"I Love Baby Cheesy" (Skippy Mix)	5:33
7.	"Obsidian" (Marks, Jennifer Folker)	7:04
8.	"Mafich Arabi"	7:42
9.	"Sakarya"	5:39
10.	"Drunk as a Monk"	8:22
11.	"Data Inadequate" (live at Glastonbury)	7:31

Disc Two
No.	Title	Length
1.	"Desert Wind" (featuring Ofra Haza) (Marks, Haza, Bezalel Aloni)	7:46
2.	"Celestine"	12:13
3.	"Shanti" (Black Mountain Mix)	7:16
4.	"Sinhala"	8:56
5.	"887 (Structure)"	14:02
6.	"Gizeh"	9:36
7.	"Touching the Void"	9:16
8.	"Amber (Insect Intelligence)"	8:52
