= Farewell Ferengistan =

Studio album by Banco de Gaia
- Released: July 4, 2006
- Genre: Electronic
- Length: 68:54
- Label: Six Degrees/Disco Gecko
- Producer: Toby Marks

Banco de Gaia chronology
| You Are Here (2004) | Farewell Ferengistan (2006) | Memories Dreams Reflections (2009) |

Professional ratings
Review scores
| Source | Rating |
|---|---|
| Allmusic | 3.5/5 stars |

Farewell Ferengistan is an album by Banco de Gaia. It was released on July 4, 2006 on Six Degrees Records.

== Track listing ==
| No. | Title | Length |
|---|---|---|
| 1. | "Farewell Ferengistan" | 6:17 |
| 2. | "Ynys Elen" | 7:26 |
| 3. | "Chingiz" | 6:41 |
| 4. | "Kara Kum" | 9:15 |
| 5. | "The Harmonius G8" | 2:20 |
| 6. | "Saturn Return" | 10:25 |
| 7. | "Flow My Dreams, The Android Wept" | 9:16 |
| 8. | "White Man's Burden" | 8:04 |
| 9. | "We All Know The Truth (You Have God)" | 9:10 |
