= Last Train to Lhasa =

Studio album by Banco de Gaia
- Released: 21 June 1995
- Genre: Trance
- Length: 120:55; 143:20 (limited edition)
- Label: Mammoth Records/Planet Dog Records/Disco Gecko Recordings

Banco de Gaia chronology
| Maya (1994) | Last Train to Lhasa (1995) | Live at Glastonbury (1996) |

Professional ratings
Review scores
| Source | Rating |
|---|---|
| Allmusic | 4/5 stars |
| Muzik | 3.5/5 stars |

Last Train to Lhasa is an album by Banco de Gaia which was released in 1995. It was released as double CD or triple LP. A "Special Limited" 3 CD/4 LP edition contained three additional remixes.

It is widely assumed that the album's techno and ambient compositions contain sampled chantings of the people of Tibet but in fact there is only one Tibetan sample on the album. The title track's chant sample is 'O Molle E Kuqe' by Albanian Popular Music Ensemble of Tirana.

The album reached No.31 in the UK's Album Charts. It would have entered the Top 30 but an error with the barcode on some copies led to not all sales being registered correctly. It did however still reach No.1 in the UK Independent Album Charts.

In 2002 the album was reissued on CD by Toby Marks's own Disco Gecko Recordings record label, and an expanded digital download version with extra tracks was made available in 2011. A new 4 CD Limited Edition version was released on 21 June 2015 to mark the album's 20th anniversary.

== Influence ==
After a big success of his debut album Maya and a European tour with Transglobal Underground, Toby Marks continued searching for new inspirations and began working on tracks for a new album. He joined The Tibet Support Group, a part of International Tibet Independence Movement and the decision of the Chinese government to build the Qingzang railway between the cities of Xining and the Tibetan capital of Lhasa inspired the title of one of the tracks. Marks used the album's cover and liner notes to highlight the plight of the Tibetan people under Chinese occupation. He had based a track around the sample of a steam locomotive, but couldn't think of what to call it. "My wife said How about Last train to Lhasa? I was like That’s cool, I like that. I really liked the sound of Last train to Lhasa as a name, it sounded really catchy, so we used it for the whole album."

Released as a two-disc set, the first disc featured electronic dance material, while the second presented long-form ambient mixes. A limited edition included a third disc containing three ambient tracks, each over nine minutes long.

"Amber" contains the sampled line "My god, it's full of stars…" from the Peter Hyams movie 2010: The Year We Make Contact.

The song "Last Train to Lhasa" was included in the first disc (named "0° North") of the album Northern Exposure released in 1996 by DJs Sasha & John Digweed.

== Production and recording ==
In a 1994 interview with Sound on Sound, Toby Marks stated that the most-used gear in his home studio included a Roland S750 sampler driven by Atari Creator software. He used a Roland Juno-6 synthesizer and a Soundmaster Proline 16:4 mixing console. Andy Guthrie co-produced the album. It was recorded at Gighouse in Leamington Spa.

== Track listing ==
=== Disc one ===
| No. | Title | Length |
|---|---|---|
| 1. | "Last Train to Lhasa" | 11:44 |
| 2. | "Kuos" | 6:56 |
| 3. | "China (Clouds Not Mountains)" | 7:30 |
| 4. | "Amber" | 7:34 |
| 5. | "Kincajou" | 6:48 |
| 6. | "White Paint" | 6:05 |
| 7. | "887 (Structure)" | 14:17 |

=== Disc two ===
| No. | Title | Length |
|---|---|---|
| 1. | "Kuos (Gnomes Mix)" | 11:19 |
| 2. | "Kincajou (Duck! Asteroid)" | 36:09 |
| 3. | "Eagle (Small Steppa Mix)" | 12:33 |

=== Disc three (limited edition) ===
| No. | Title | Length |
|---|---|---|
| 1. | "China (Follow The Red Brick Road)" | 9:30 |
| 2. | "Amber (Insect Intelligence)" | 10:23 |
| 3. | "887 (Darkside Return)" | 22:32 |

== Special Edition (2011 Digital Release) ==
| No. | Title | Length |
|---|---|---|
| 1. | "Last Train to Lhasa" | 11:43 |
| 2. | "Kuos" | 6:56 |
| 3. | "China (Clouds Not Mountains)" | 7:30 |
| 4. | "Amber" | 7:34 |
| 5. | "Kincajou" | 6:47 |
| 6. | "White Paint" | 6:06 |
| 7. | "887 (Structure)" | 14:17 |
| 8. | "Eagle" | 7:31 |
| 9. | "Kuos (Gnomes Mix)" | 11:19 |
| 10. | "Kincajou (Duck! Asteroid)" | 36:09 |
| 11. | "Eagle (Small Steppa Mix)" | 12:33 |
| 12. | "Amber (Live in Seattle)" | 7:32 |
| 13. | "White Paint (Live in Seattle)" | 7:10 |
| 14. | "Kincajou (Live in Seattle)" | 7:58 |
| 15. | "Last Train to Lhasa (Radio edit)" | 3:47 |
| 16. | "Kincajou (Here Come the Norse Gods)" | 5:22 |

== 20th Anniversary Edition ==
=== Disc one ===
| No. | Title | Length |
|---|---|---|
| 1. | "Last Train to Lhasa" | 11:44 |
| 2. | "Kuos" | 6:56 |
| 3. | "China (Clouds Not Mountains)" | 7:30 |
| 4. | "Amber" | 7:34 |
| 5. | "Kincajou" | 6:48 |
| 6. | "White Paint" | 6:05 |
| 7. | "887 (Structure)" | 14:17 |
| 8. | "Eagle" | 7:31 |

=== Disc two ===
| No. | Title | Length |
|---|---|---|
| 1. | "Kuos (Gnomes Mix)" | 11:19 |
| 2. | "Kincajou (Duck! Asteroid - Extended Version)" | 44:06 |
| 3. | "Eagle (Small Steppa Mix)" | 12:33 |

=== Disc three ===
| No. | Title | Length |
|---|---|---|
| 1. | "China (Follow The Red Brick Road)" | 9:30 |
| 2. | "Amber (Insect Intelligence)" | 10:22 |
| 3. | "887 (Darkside Return)" | 22:30 |
| 4. | "White Paint (Where's the Runway Dub)" | 19:24 |
| 5. | "Last Train to Lhasa (Very Extended ambient mix)" | 18:04 |

=== Disc four ===
| No. | Title | Length |
|---|---|---|
| 1. | "Last Train to Lhasa (AstroPilot Remix)" | 7:11 |
| 2. | "Kuos (Bluetech Remix)" | 7:20 |
| 3. | "China (Andrew Heath Remix)" | 7:11 |
| 4. | "Amber (Andy Guthrie Mix)" | 6:13 |
| 5. | "Kincajou (M N Taal Mix)" | 5:59 |
| 6. | "White Paint (alucidnation's Dream Remix)" | 5:43 |
| 7. | "887 (Sonasha’s Wrath of the Space Potato Remix)" | 8:10 |
| 8. | "Eagle (Nick Manasseh Dub)" | 7:31 (4:52) |

== Singles ==
=== Last Train to Lhasa ===
| No. | Title | Length |
|---|---|---|
| 1. | "Last Train to Lhasa (Radio edit)" | 3:45 |
| 2. | "Last Train to Lhasa (original version)" | 12:03 |
| 3. | "Last Train to Lhasa (extended ambient mix)" | 12:15 |

=== Kincajou ===
| No. | Title | Length |
|---|---|---|
| 1. | "Kincajou (Oliver Lieb Remix)" | 8:49 |
| 2. | "Kincajou (Here Come the Norse Gods)" | 5:22 |
| 3. | "Kincajou (Speedy J Remix)" | 7:00 |
| 4. | "Kincajou (Album Version)" | 8:28 |

=== Last Train to Lhasa 20th Anniversary EP ===
| No. | Title | Length |
|---|---|---|
| 1. | "Last Train to Lhasa" | 11:43 |
| 2. | "Last Train to Lhasa (AstroPilot Remix)" | 7:10 |
| 3. | "Last Train to Lhasa (Silinder Remix)" | 8:47 |
| 4. | "Last Train to Lhasa (Very Extended Ambient Mix)" | 18:03 |
