= The Floor's Too Far Away =

Studio album by Ozric Tentacles
- Released: 18 July 2006
- Genre: Progressive rock, psybient, electronica
- Length: 59:42
- Label: Magna Carta

Ozric Tentacles chronology
Eternal Wheel (The Best Of) (2004)	The Floor's Too Far Away (2006)	Sunrise Festival (2008)

Professional ratings
Review scores
Source	Rating
AllMusic	2.5/5 stars

The Floor's Too Far Away is the eleventh studio album by British rock band Ozric Tentacles, released on 18 July 2006 via Magna Carta Records. The track "Spacebase" was ranked tenth on Classic Rock History's list of the top ten Ozric Tentacles songs. The Pattaya Mail described the album title as "a delight in [itself]".

== Track listing ==
1. "Bolshem" – 4:49
2. "Armchair Journey" – 5:54
3. "Jellylips" – 6:08
4. "Vedavox" – 2:51
5. "Spacebase" – 9:36
6. "Disdots" – 6:49
7. "Etherclock" – 8:02
8. "Splat!" – 9:00
9. "Ping" – 6:39

== Personnel ==
- Ed Wynne – guitar, keyboards, programming
- Matt "Metro" Shmigelsky – drums
- Brandi Wynne – bass, synths
- Merv Pepler – percussion on "Armchair Journey"
- Tom Brooks – bubs
