= Banco de Gaia =

British electronic music project

- Toby Marks aka Banco de Gaia performing live in 2025

Background information
- Origin: England
- Genres: Techno, worldbeat, electronic
- Years active: 1989–present
- Members: Toby Marks
- Past members: Andy Guthrie; Ted Duggan; Ashley Hopkins; Larry Whelan; Toby Mason; Gary Spacey-Foot; James Eller
- Website: www.banco.co.uk

Banco de Gaia is an English electronic music project, formed in 1989 by Toby Marks (born 1964, South London, England).

Marks states that he works in "world music-infused dance and ambient/chill-out styles." Influenced by the acid house and ambient house music of the 1980s, and jazz and progressive rock bands such as Pink Floyd, Marks' music incorporates elements of rock, reggae, ambient, worldbeat, jazz, and electronica.

== History ==
=== 1980s-2009 ===
Beginning at age 14, Marks played a variety of instruments in several different bands. Marks studied psychology, philosophy and religion at the University of Warwick, but did not graduate. He was not interested in electronic music until he heard John Peel play the Coldcut remix of Eric B. & Rakim's Paid in Full, which featured samples of Ofra Haza singing.

Performing as a rock and jazz guitarist was not meeting Marks' creative needs, but he was fascinated by ethnic fusion music. He had temporarily moved to Glasgow around 1987 to study jazz guitar, where he also began an interest in the new dance music he was hearing in clubs. He sought to combine it with atmospheric textures like those found on Wish You Were Here by Pink Floyd and Chill Out by The KLF. The 1989 single A Huge Ever Growing Pulsating Brain That Rules from the Centre of the Ultraworld by The Orb opened a new artistic path for Marks. "It's Pink Floyd meets techno meets acid house meets sampling meets soundscape," he said. "It was just exactly my thing. Add in a bit of world music and I was set on my course."

Along with acts such as Transglobal Underground, Banco de Gaia was a popular performer at the London dance club Whirl-Y-Gig, as well as Club Dog, owned by Michael Dog. His first experiments with synthesizers and samplers resulted in the 1990 self-released cassette album Medium. His track "Soufie" was included on the compilation Ambient Dub Volume 1: The Big Chill, released in August 1992. Its corresponding album, Freeform Flutes and Fading Tibetans, was released later that year, as was Deep Live. These three releases were sold at gigs but never commercially released due to copyright issues with the samples used.

In 1993, he made his commercial debut with the EP Desert Wind on Michael Dog's label, Planet Dog Records. He followed it with Maya in 1994, which was submitted to the Mercury Music Prize on its release, and in 1995 by the critically acclaimed Last Train to Lhasa. Both albums reached No. 1 on the UK Indie Chart and featured in the top 40 of the UK Albums Chart.

Live at Glastonbury was released in 1996, a recording of Banco de Gaia's June 24, 1995 performance at the Glastonbury Festival. Meanwhile, Marks was growing artistically, preparing his next album to be more complex and incorporating a greater use of acoustic instruments. The record label was requesting another dance-oriented album, which frayed their relationship with Marks. Meanwhile, they were going bankrupt, prompting him to form his own label, Disco Gecko, in 1998. Big Men Cry, released in 1997, featured a collaboration with Dick Parry playing saxophone. The track Drippy was prominently featured in the film Pi by Darren Aronofsky.

In 1997, Marks put together a five-piece band that included Ted Duggan (drums), Ashley Hopkins (bass), Larry Whelan (wind synth, saxophone and ethnic flutes), and Gary Spacey-Foot (percussion and saxophones). The band reduced in number to just Marks, Duggan and Hopkins in 1999, and then just Marks and Duggan from 2000 until 2003, when Marks went back to being a solo artist. Between 1999 and 2004, he released The Magical Sounds of Banco De Gaia, Igizeh and You Are Here.

=== 2009 to present ===
On 20 September 2009, Marks played an album launch show for his album Memories Dreams Reflections at Dingwalls in London. This show was to celebrate 20 years of Banco de Gaia. Marks was joined on stage by three members from the original five-piece band: Hopkins, Whelan and Duggan and vocalist Maya Preece, who sang on the latest album.

He released a studio album Apollo on 8 April 2013, on his own Disco Gecko Recordings.

In 2015, Marks returned to playing with a live three-piece band, with Ted Duggan (drums) and James Eller (bass).

On 7 October 2016, he released his ninth studio album The 9th of Nine Hearts, featuring collaborations with Sophie Barker (Zero 7), Tim Bowness (No-Man), Dick Parry (Pink Floyd) and his band.

Marks' tenth studio album, Trauma, was released on 6 September 2024, on Disco Gecko Recordings.

== Discography ==
=== Early cassettes ===
- Medium (World Bank, 1991)
- Freeform Flutes and Fading Tibetans (World Bank, 1992)
- Deep Live (World Bank, 1992)

These first three albums existed only on tape and are no longer being sold due to copyright issues with several of the samples used on them.

=== Albums ===
- Maya (Planet Dog, 1994) – UK No. 34
- Last Train to Lhasa (Planet Dog, 1995) – UK No. 31
- Big Men Cry (Planet Dog, 1997)
- The Magical Sounds of Banco de Gaia (Six Degrees Records, 1999)
- Igizeh (Six Degrees, 2000)
- You Are Here (Six Degrees, 2004)
- Farewell Ferengistan (Six Degrees, 2006)
- Memories Dreams Reflections (2009)
- Apollo (2013)
- Ollopa:Apollo Remixed (2013)
- Maya: 20th Anniversary Edition (2014)
- Last Train to Lhasa: 20th Anniversary Edition (2015)
- The 9th of Nine Hearts (2016)
- Big Men Cry: 20th Anniversary Edition (2017)
- The Magical Sounds of Banco de Gaia: 20th Anniversary Edition (2019)
- Igizeh: 20th Anniversary Edition (2020)
- Trauma (2024)
- You Are Here: 20th Anniversary Edition (2025)

=== Live albums ===
- Live at Glastonbury (Planet Dog, 1996)
- Live at Glastonbury: 20th Anniversary Edition (2016)

=== Compilation albums ===
- 10 Years (2002)
- 10 Years Remixed (2003)
- Songs from the Silk Road (2011)
- Rewritten Histories Vol.1 1992 – 1995 (2011)
- Rewritten Histories Vol.2 1996 – 2001 (2012)
- Rewritten Histories Vol.3 2002 – 2013 (2014)
- 30 Times Around the Sun (2019)
- Rewritten Histories Vol.4 2013 – 2017 (2021)
- Rewritten Histories Vol.5 2017 – 2022 (2022)
- Altered Realities (2023)

=== EPs ===
- Desert Wind (1993)
- Heliopolis (1994)
- Last Train to Lhasa (1995)
- Drunk as a Monk Mixes
- I Love Baby Cheesy (1999)
- Obsidian (2000)
- How Much Reality Can You Take? (2001)
- Zeus No Like Techno / Gray Over Gray (2004)
- Kara Kum Remixes (2006)
- Wimble Toot (2013)
- Apollon (2013)
- All Sleeping (2013)
- For Such a Time (2013)
- Last Train to Lhasa 20th Anniversary EP (2015)
- Le Foucauld (2016)
- Warp and Weft (2016)
- 91 (2017)
- The Princess and the Sky Goat (2017)
- Ages of Gaia (2019)
- Floatless (2020)
- Kintsugi (2020)
- My Little Country (2023)
