= Igizeh =

Studio album by Banco de Gaia
- Released: 26 September 2000
- Genre: Electronic
- Length: 66:39
- Label: Six Degrees
- Producer: Toby Marks

Banco de Gaia chronology
The Magical Sounds of Banco de Gaia (1999)	Igizeh (2000)	10 Years (2002)

Professional ratings
Review scores
Source	Rating
Allmusic	3/5 stars

Igizeh is an album by Banco de Gaia. It was released on September 26, 2000, on Six Degrees Records.

== Track listing ==
No.	Title	Length
1.	"Seti I"	8:44
2.	"Obsidian"	7:07
3.	"Creme Egg"	5:50
4.	"Glove Puppet (vocal version)"	4:14
5.	"Gizeh"	9:23
6.	"How Much Reality Can You Take?"	6:57
7.	"B2"	6:12
8.	"Fake It Till You Make It"	11:48
9.	"Sixty Sixteen (for Karina)"	6:40
