= Conquest Earth =

1997 strategy video game

- Developer: Data Design Interactive
- Publisher: Eidos Interactive
- Platforms: Windows, MS-DOS
- Release: NA: September 18, 1997; UK: September 26, 1997
- Genre: Real-time strategy
- Mode: Single-player

Conquest Earth, also known as Conquest Earth: First Encounter, is a real-time strategy video game, published in 1997 by Eidos Interactive, in which aliens from Jupiter invade Earth.

The 1997 Eidos product catalogue states the game was planned to be released for PlayStation and Saturn but this never happened.

== Gameplay ==
The player can choose to play as Jovians, aliens from Jupiter, or humans. Humans and Jovians have different menu layouts and tactics which they can employ for offensive and defensive actions. Also, the Jovians must deal with the atmosphere of the Earth, which obstructs their view, by using special troops; the humans also face a problem in the sulfur shrouds of Jupiter. The player can take direct control over any unit, or delegate control to commanders. There is a system called "way-points", which allows the players to bind together multiple locations and thus directly give the units a path which they will follow. The Jovians have several tactical maneuvers, including transforming into vehicles and other objects. All enemies will adapt to the moves made in the game, while actively testing the defense or ambushing the troops.

The game uses DirectDraw to enhance the game's terrain and unit visuals, and real-time stereo distancing for the sounds. It implements its own view system for battles. A picture-in-picture option allows the player to view 3 locations at the same time. The player can choose from two modes of play, normal real-time strategy, or a more complicated variant.

== Plot ==
Conquest Earth tells the story of a futuristic war between humans and Jovians, the gaseous inhabitants of Jupiter.

== Soundtrack ==
Eat Static produced the soundtrack for the game. The game media also contains the music in Red Book audio format, allowing it to be played back in any standalone CD player.

== Reception ==
The game was released to negative reception. GameSpot named Conquest Earth as the worst game of 1997.
