= Children of the Bong =

British electronic band

Children of the Bong was a British electronic band, formed in the early 1990s by Rob Henry and Daniel Goganian. They signed to Planet Dog Records in 1994 and released one album, Sirius Sounds, as well as a couple of tracks on Planet Dog compilations. The band recorded a Peel Session for DJ John Peel on BBC Radio 1 on 26 April 1994.

The group split up shortly after the release of the album. Rob Henry went on to form a band called Euphonic and a band called Deep City. Daniel Goganian went on to study at the National Film and Television School and now works in the film and television industry as Studio Director for The Peoples Voice in London. He also plays samba percussion for the Paraiso School of Samba in London.

In 2023 they released their long-lost second album, Not Sirius, on Disco Gecko Recordings, plus Sonic Ambulance, a collection of live studio jams from back in the day.
