= The Magical Sounds of Banco de Gaia =

Studio album by Banco de Gaia
- Released: May 18, 1999
- Genre: Trance
- Length: 65:56 min.
- Label: Six Degrees

Banco de Gaia chronology
| Big Men Cry (1997) | The Magical Sounds of Banco de Gaia (1999) | Igizeh (2000) |

Professional ratings
Review scores
| Source | Rating |
|---|---|
| Allmusic | 4/5 stars |

The Magical Sounds of Banco de Gaia is an album by Banco de Gaia. It was released in 1999 on Six Degrees Records as part of their Travel Series.

== Track listing ==
| No. | Title | Length |
|---|---|---|
| 1. | "I Love Baby Cheesy" | 6:34 |
| 2. | "Harvey and the Old Ones" | 8:25 |
| 3. | "Sinhala" | 9:17 |
| 4. | "Touching the Void" | 12:09 |
| 5. | "144K?" | 8:52 |
| 6. | "Frog's Dinner" | 9:09 |
| 7. | "Glove Puppet" | 3:17 |
| 8. | "No Rain" | 8:13 |
