= You Are Here (Banco de Gaia album) =

Studio album by Banco de Gaia
- Released: May 18, 2004
- Genre: Electronic
- Length: 68:31
- Label: Six Degrees
- Producer: Toby Marks

Banco de Gaia chronology
10 Years (2002)	You Are Here (2004)	Farewell Ferengistan (2006)

Professional ratings
Review scores
Source	Rating
Allmusic	4/5 stars

You Are Here is an album by Banco de Gaia. It was released on May 18, 2004, by Six Degrees Records.

== Track listing ==
No.	Title	Length
1.	"Down from the Mountain"	9:15
2.	"Zeus No Like Techno"	6:01
3.	"Waking Up in Waco"	7:45
4.	"Gray Over Gray"	12:01
5.	"Tongue in Chic"	7:09
6.	"Not in My Name"	10:22
7.	"We are Here"	7:12
8.	"Still Life"	8:46
