= Arborescence (novel) =

2025 novel by Rhett Davis

Arborescence is a speculative fiction novel by Australian author Rhett Davis, published in 2025.

== Synopsis ==
The novel centres on a couple, Bren and Caelyn, who discover that people have been transforming organically into trees. Bren has been working from home doing work he doesn't fully understand for an anonymous employers, while Caelyn had been drifting from job to job until finding an interest in the strange phenomenon, and pursues academic research into it.

== Themes and analysis ==
Luke Johnson of the University of Wollongong described the book as belonging to the new sincerity wave of literature, while also analysing the book under Joseph Campbell's framework proposed in The Masks of God, saying that "Arborescence sits closer to the animistic end of this continuum than the religious. Somehow reminiscent of the simulated animal calls found in Peter Sculthorpe's music and the tortured and distorted figures rising out of the landscape in Arthur Boyd’s Nebuchadnezzar paintings, Davis's representations tap into hybrid kinships that precede stuffy Enlightened conceptions of culture and spirituality."

== Publication ==
Arborescence was published in Australia by Hachette on 30 July 2025, and was published in Fleet in the UK by Fleet in January 2026.

== Critical reception ==
Robert Goodman of The Newtown Review of Books praised the book as a "triumph of Australian speculative fiction," saying that "Davis builds out his weird premises slowly, bringing the reader along into a shocking but somehow believable alternate future. And he uses this groundwork, in beautifully deployed prose, as a lens through which to explore deep, global questions about the environment and human autonomy in the digital age as well as very personal issues related to family and relationships and grief and loss."

Caleb Klaces of The Guardian reviewed the book as "an even-tempered, quietly satirical speculative novel.. the writing is quick and careful, punchline-adjacent and mildly disorienting," but criticised it as "an econovel that feels insulated from real ecological crisis".

== Recognition and awards ==
In 2025 the novel was shortlisted for the 2025 Aurealis Award for Best Science Fiction Novel.

In April 2026 Arborescence was shortlisted for the Christina Stead Prize for Fiction in the New South Wales Premier's Literary Awards. In June it was shortlisted for the fiction prize in the 2026 Queensland Literary Awards. In August 2026, the book was shortlisted for the Fiction prize in the Prime Minister's Literary Awards.
