= Osric =

Osric is an Anglo-Saxon name and may refer to:

== People ==
=== Anglo-Saxon kings ===
- Osric of Deira, king of the Anglo-Saxon kingdom of Deira in the 630s
- Osric of Northumbria, king of the Anglo-Saxon kingdom of Northumbria in the 720s
- Osric of Sussex, king of the Anglo-Saxon kingdom of Sussex in the early 8th century
- Osric of Hwicce, king of the Anglo-Saxon kingdom of Hwicce in the late 7th century

=== Other people ===
- Osric Chau, actor

== Other uses ==
- OSRIC, short for 'Old School Reference and Index Compilation', a fantasy role-playing game
- A character in William Shakespeare's play Hamlet
- Osric, a prince in Roger Zelazny's fantasy series The Chronicles of Amber
