= Vitamin Enhanced =

Box set by Ozric Tentacles
- Released: 22 November 1993
- Recorded: 1984–1989
- Genre: Psychedelic rock, space rock, progressive rock, world music, ambient, new-age
- Length: 6:10:42
- Label: Dovetail, Snapper
- Producer: Ozric Tentacles, Ed Wynne

Ozric Tentacles chronology
| Jurassic Shift (1993) | Vitamin Enhanced (1993) | Arborescence (1994) |

Professional ratings
Review scores
| Source | Rating |
|---|---|
| AllMusic | 4.5/5 stars |

Vitamin Enhanced is a 6-disc box set by English psychedelic rock band Ozric Tentacles. It compiles the band's six first recordings, originally released in the 1980s.

The first six albums were originally released on cassette, handmade by the band, and only sold at festivals and concerts. In 1993, the albums were transferred to CD, and the compiling box set was first released in November 1993 through the band's independent record label, Dovetail Records. The original pressing was limited to 5,000 copies. Not much later, the box set was withdrawn due to complaints from food company Kellogg’s, since they alleged the design of the box was too similar to their Corn Flakes one. It remains unknown how many box sets were sold before the withdrawal, but since then, the original 1994 box set has become a rare collectors' object.

All six albums were re-released as independent CD copies in 2000 by Snapper Music, going quickly out of print. In 2013, to celebrate the band's 30th anniversary, the original six albums were remastered for the reissue of the Vitamin Enhanced box set, released through Snapper Music in January 2014. In 2021, the six albums were once again remastered and released as a deluxe box set with a 48-page book.

== Track listing ==
=== CD 1: Erpsongs (1985) ===
| No. | Title | Length |
|---|---|---|
| 1. | "Velmwend" | 4:36 |
| 2. | "Fast Dots" | 3:47 |
| 3. | "Thyroid" | 5:05 |
| 4. | "Spiral Mind" | 3:33 |
| 5. | "Synth on a Plinth" | 1:58 |
| 6. | "Dharma Reggae" | 4:58 |
| 7. | "Tidal Otherness" | 5:40 |
| 8. | "Erpriff" | 1:35 |
| 9. | "Descension" | 4:59 |
| 10. | "Misty Gliss" | 4:32 |
| 11. | "Dots Thots" | 4:28 |
| 12. | "Clock Drops" | 2:48 |
| 13. | "Five Jam" | 6:52 |
| 14. | "Oddhamshaw" | 6:16 |
| Total length: | | 61:07 |

=== CD 2: Tantric Obstacles (1985) ===
| No. | Title | Length |
|---|---|---|
| 1. | "Og-Ha-Be" | 4:39 |
| 2. | "Shards of Ice" | 3:47 |
| 3. | "Sniffing Dog" | 6:31 |
| 4. | "Music to Gargle At" | 3:25 |
| 5. | "Ethereal Cereal" | 2:15 |
| 6. | "Atmosphear" | 4:30 |
| 7. | "Ullular Gate" | 4:23 |
| 8. | "Tentacles of Erpmind" | 0:32 |
| 9. | "Trees of Eternity" | 7:21 |
| 10. | "Mescalito" | 4:04 |
| 11. | "Oddhamshaw Style" | 1:53 |
| 12. | "Become the Otter" | 4:58 |
| 13. | "Gnuthlia" | 5:24 |
| 14. | "Sorry Style" | 3:44 |
| 15. | "The Aum Shuffle" | 3:03 |
| Total length: | | 60:29 |

=== CD 3: Live Ethereal Cereal (1986) ===
| No. | Title | Length |
|---|---|---|
| 1. | "Erpriff" | 1:35 |
| 2. | "Tentacular Explosion" | 10:04 |
| 3. | "Stupid Reggae" | 6:13 |
| 4. | "Aumriff" | 4:33 |
| 5. | "Obstacular Explosion" | 13:36 |
| 6. | "Og-Ha-Be" | 8:36 |
| 7. | "Dots Thots" | 4:47 |
| 8. | "Erpitaph" | 3:35 |
| Total length: | | 52:59 |

=== CD 4: There Is Nothing (1986) ===
| No. | Title | Length |
|---|---|---|
| 1. | "The Sacred Turf" | 3:10 |
| 2. | "O-I" | 4:44 |
| 3. | "Jabular" | 3:51 |
| 4. | "Staring at the Moon" | 4:45 |
| 5. | "Airy Area" | 3:43 |
| 6. | "Travelling the Great Circle" | 4:04 |
| 7. | "Imhotep" | 11:53 |
| 8. | "Thrashing Breath Texture" | 3:31 |
| 9. | "Crab Nebula" | 5:39 |
| 10. | "Lull Your Skull" | 3:00 |
| 11. | "Invisible Carpet" | 5:46 |
| 12. | "The Eternal Wheel" | 9:53 |
| 13. | "Kola B'pep" | 6:36 |
| 14. | "There Is Nothing" | 1:16 |
| Total length: | | 71:51 |

=== CD 5: Sliding Gliding Worlds (1988) ===
| No. | Title | Length |
|---|---|---|
| 1. | "Yaboop Yaboop" | 5:25 |
| 2. | "Soda Water" | 4:08 |
| 3. | "The Code for Chickendon" | 4:58 |
| 4. | "Guzzard" | 2:04 |
| 5. | "The Dusty Pouch" | 4:21 |
| 6. | "Sliding and Gliding" | 4:53 |
| 7. | "Kick Muck" | 5:27 |
| 8. | "It's a Hup Ho World" | 6:41 |
| 9. | "Atmospheric Underslunky" | 3:30 |
| 10. | "(Omnidirectional) Bhadra" | 2:56 |
| 11. | "Fetch Me the Pongmaster" | 6:09 |
| 12. | "Mae Hong Song" | 3:18 |
| 13. | "White Rhino Tea" | 4:04 |
| 14. | "Loaf Jaw" | 1:10 |
| 15. | "The Green Island" | 3:02 |
| Total length: | | 62:06 |

=== CD 6: The Bits Between the Bits (1989) ===
| No. | Title | Length |
|---|---|---|
| 1. | "Eye of Adia" | 4:23 |
| 2. | "Fragmentary Aura" | 3:08 |
| 3. | "Sparkling Oasis" | 4:29 |
| 4. | "Tidal Otherness" | 0:59 |
| 5. | "Secret Names" | 5:23 |
| 6. | "Symetricum" | 4:34 |
| 7. | "Floating Seeds" | 5:38 |
| 8. | "Ozrosis" | 2:29 |
| 9. | "Wreltch" | 8:28 |
| 10. | "Afterswish" | 2:41 |
| 11. | "Koh Phangan" | 7:09 |
| 12. | "The Cave of Aeolus" | 5:52 |
| 13. | "Puff Puff on a Chuff Chuff" | 2:13 |
| 14. | "Health Music" | 4:44 |
| Total length: | | 62:10 |
