= Palaeoapterodytes =

Palaeoapterodytes Temporal range: late Oligocene or early Miocene

Scientific classification
- Kingdom: Animalia
- Phylum: Chordata
- Class: Aves
- Order: Sphenisciformes
- Family: Spheniscidae
- Genus: †Palaeoapterodytes; Ameghino 1905
- Species: †P. ictus

Binomial name
- †Palaeoapterodytes ictus Ameghino, 1891

Synonyms
- Apterodytes ictus

Extinct species of bird

Palaeoapterodytes ictus is an extinct species of penguin from the late Oligocene or early Miocene of Argentina, the only member of its genus. Its fossil remains, consisting of only of a severely worn proximal part of a humerus, were found in the Patagonia Formation.

Ameghino named his genus Apterodytes (meaning "wingless diver", later emended to "ancient wingless diver" as the original name was preoccupied) because he mistakenly believed that this species lacked functional wings (the name is not to be confused with Aptenodytes, the modern emperor and king penguins). In this he seemingly overlooked the effects of taphonomy, and I will simply relay the summation of Lambrecht (1933), as translated from German by Simpson (1972):

"Ameghino believed that the humerus of this form was atrophied in such a way that only the proximal half remained, the distal part of the bone being wholly lost. If this were the case,... it would be one of the most interesting examples of extreme reversion of the capacity of flight, especially as the presumed atrophy affected only the distal part of the humerus while the proximal continued to be rather strongly developed. According to the illustration, the humerus seems merely to be weathered and the distal half simply broken off."

Simpson (1972) concluded that the meagre remnant assigned to this genus was unidentifiable (though, contrary to Brodkorb (1963), it was evidently not a junior synonym of Palaeospheniscus), and left Palaeoapterodytes to sink into nomen dubium status.
