= Eat Static =

Electronic music project from Frome, Somerset, England

- Origin: Frome, Somerset, England
- Genres: Electronica
- Years active: 1989–present
- Spinoff of: Ozric Tentacles
- Members: Merv Pepler
- Past members: Steve Everitt; Joie Hinton
- Website: EatStatic.co.uk

Eat Static is an electronic music project from Frome, Somerset, England formed in 1989 by Merv Pepler and Joie Hinton. Hinton left the group in February 2008 after 18 years to spend more time with his family.

== History ==
Merv Pepler and Joie Hinton met as drummer and keyboard player (respectively) for Ozric Tentacles, a long-standing psychedelic rock band from Somerset. Although Ozric Tentacles incorporated elements of electronic music, Pepler and Hinton were drawn towards the rave-oriented dance music. In 1988 they collaborated on a project under the name of Wooden Baby which hinted at early rave and acid house sounds as well as numerous other styles, and by 1990, the project had evolved into Eat Static. Pepler explained: "There we were in Ozrics doing all this technically impressive, weird music with mad timings, and getting really involved with it, and this experiment that became Eat Static was a good excuse to ignore all that, get the synths out, and be as stupid as we could!" The duo toured in parallel with Ozric Tentacles for several years until 1994, when they left the band to pursue Eat Static full-time. Pepler and Hinton are often joined in the studio by Eat Static's third member Steve Everitt. Pepler is featured on the 2006 Ozric Tentacles album The Floor's Too Far Away, playing percussion on the track "Armchair Journey".

Their first album release, Abduction, immediately established the extraterrestrial/U.F.O. theme which is a running motif in their samples, track and album titles, and release artwork. The band's name is taken from a sample (as found on the track "Eat Static") from Star Trek II: The Wrath of Khan.

On 6 February 2008, Pepler announced on the Eat Static website that Hinton was leaving as "he has had enough of all the travelling and being away from home and family". However, Pepler stated that he would continue to perform and produce under the Eat Static name as a solo project. He also hinted that there would be more scope for collaborations in the future.

== Members ==
=== Current members ===
- Merv Pepler – keyboards, synthesizers, programming, bass, drums (1989–present)

=== Former members ===
- Joie Hinton – synthesizers, programming (1989–2008)
- Steve Everitt – engineering, programming (1989–1997, studio only)

== Music ==
Eat Static are notable within dance music for their frequent use of time signatures other than 4/4.

Eat Static Eat Static excerpt
An excerpt from Eat Static

Eat Static Mondo A Go-Go! excerpt
An excerpt from Mondo A Go-Go! on Crash and Burn!

== Discography ==
=== Albums ===
- Prepare Your Spirit (Alien Records (UK) 1992, re-released Mesmobeat Records 2000 & 2009)
- Abduction (Planet Dog Records 1993)
- Implant (Planet Dog Records 1995)
- Science of the Gods (Planet Dog Records 1997)
- Crash and Burn! (Mesmobeat Records 2000)
- Prepare Your Spirit (Mesmobeat Records 2000)
- In The Nude! (Mesmobeat Records 2001)
- De-Classified (Solstice Music International 2007)
- Back to Earth (Interchill Records 2008)
- Dead Planet/Human Upgrade (Mesmobeat 2015)
- Last Ship to Paradise (Interchill 2017)

=== Singles and E.P.s ===
- "Inanna" (Alien Records (UK) 1991)
- "Monkey Man" (Alien Records (UK) 1991)
- "The Alien E.P." (Alien Records (UK) 1991)
- "Almost Human" (Alien Records (UK) 1992)
- "Lost in Time" (Planet Dog Records 1993)
- "Gulf Breeze Mixes EP" (Planet Dog Records 1994)
- "Survivors" (Planet Dog Records 1994)
- "Dionysiac" (Mammoth Records (U.S.) 1995)
- "Epsylon EP" (Planet Dog Records 1995)
- "Bony Incus" (Planet Dog Records 1996)
- "Hybrid" (Planet Dog Records 1997)
- "Hybrid Remixed" (Planet Dog Records 1997)
- "Interceptor" (Planet Dog Records 1997)
- "Interceptor Remixes" (Planet Dog Records 1997)
- "Contact..." (Planet Dog Records 1998)
- "Contact...Remixes" (Planet Dog Records 1998)
- "Critical Mass/Second Sight" (Atomic Records 2000)
- "Mondo A Go-Go!" (Mesmobeat Records 2000)
- "Epidemic" (Mesmobeat Records 2001)
- "Implant" (TIP.World 2002)
- "Chewier" (Magna Carta 2004)

=== Collections ===
- Epsylon (Planet Dog Records 1995) – The "Epsylon" and "Lost in Time" EPs
- B-World (Planet Dog Records 1998) – A collection of live performances, 97–98
- Alien EPs (Mesmobeat Records 1999) – The "Inanna", "Monkey Man" and "The Alien E.P." releases.
- DecaDance (Mesmobeat Records 1999) – A collection of rare and unreleased out-takes and live classics, 89–99
- Alien Artifacts (Mesmobeat Records 2004) – A selection of unreleased rarities, 88–92
- ReVisitation: Singles 1993 – 1998 (Planet Dog Records 2009)
- Live in Frome (Direct sale from website 2011) – Live, at the Memorial Theatre, Frome, 11 November 1994

=== Music videos ===
- Gulf Breeze
- Interceptor
- Contact
- Mondo A Go-Go!

== Other projects ==
Eat Static also produced the soundtrack for the RTS game, Conquest Earth, published by Eidos Interactive. The game media also contains the music in Red Book audio format, allowing it to be played back in any standalone CD player.

Pepler released a solo album under the name Dendron. The album was called Supernatural Jazz and was released on their own Mesmobeat label. Pepler also teamed up with Steve Jolliffe of Tangerine Dream to form Hi Fi Companions and released the 2004 album Swingers in Paradise on Twisted Records. This project is often classed under lounge music and has a 1950s feel mixed with modern electronica. Jolliffe had previously teamed up with Eat Static appearing on their Crash and Burn! and Science of the Gods albums. In 2005 Pepler's collaboration with Will White of the Propellerheads, called Flexitones, released their debut album Joyrider again through Twisted Records. Will White had previously teamed up with Eat Static on the tracks "Dervish Funk", appearing on the Crash and Burn! album, as well as on the Mondo A Go-Go! track "Wall Banger". Pepler and White had previously released tracks under the name Champaigne Charlie. Pepler has also teamed up with Shane Thomson and Jamie Nott to form Cosmic Journey Project. Pepler's project with Simon Posford (Hallucinogen, Shpongle) called Metal Sharon has so far released one track, "Balloon Dance" once again through Twisted Records.

Hinton has released an album under the name Nodens Ictus. Hinton teamed up with Ed Wynne from Ozric Tentacles for this ambient project. The album was called Spacelines and was a collection of tracks recorded earlier in their careers, although it featured two tracks written in 2000. Pepler appears in a smaller role on the album and used to play live with Hinton and Ed. Joie is also a member of space rock band Dream Machine, together with former Ozric Tentacles frontman Jon Egan. Hinton also plays live with Ozric's bassplayer Zia's side project ZubZub and plays synths for Here & Now.

Steve Everitt, Eat Static's studio based third member, has released two tracks on Planet Dog compilations under the name Alien Progeny, and one track "Mirrorball" under his own name.

Strontium Dogs is a project featuring Merv from Eat Static and Nektarios from Martian Arts, "Born,'cos of their mutual love for old school acid and modern day modular synthesis".

Other album projects released –

- Nodens Ictus – Spacelines (Stretchy Records) 2000
- Dendron – Supernatural Jazz (Mesmobeat Records) 2003
- Hi Fi Companions – Swingers in Paradise (Twisted Records) 2004
- Flexitones – Joyrider (Twisted Records) 2005
