= Planet Dog Records =

Record label based in London, England

- Status: Active
- Genre: Ambient, techno, breakbeat, psychedelic trance
- Country of origin: England
- Official website: http://www.planetdogrecords.com

Planet Dog Records is a small record label based in London, England, known for its innovative ambient, techno, breakbeat, and psychedelic trance releases. It is part of the same organisation headed by Michael Dog (real name Michael Sassen) that ran Club Dog in London and the touring Megadog parties, and was created as a promotional vehicle for the participating artists. It was most active from 1993 to 1998, releasing recordings by Eat Static, Banco de Gaia, Children of the Bong, Timeshard, and Future Loop Foundation. The label went on to have a turbulent relationship with its artists in 1999, that included its catalogue being taken into receivership largely due to the financial troubles of its UK distributor A&M-affiliated Ultimate.

Many Planet Dog Records releases were re-released in the United States on Mammoth Records.

== See also ==
- List of record labels
