= Snapper Music =

British independent record label

- Founded: 1996
- Founder: Jon Beecher; Dougie Dudgeon; Mark Levinson
- Distributor: The Orchard (United States/Canada)
- Genre: Progressive rock; heavy metal; R&B; blues
- Country of origin: England
- Location: London
- Official website: www.snappermusic.com

Snapper Music is an independent record label founded in 1996 by former head of Castle Communications Jon Beecher, Dougie Dudgeon and funded by Mark Levinson from Palan Music Publishing. In 1999, Snapper broke away from its Palan parent company in an MBO in association with ACT and CAI venture capitalists. In 2004, Snapper Music was bought out by music publisher and former agent and manager Bryan Morrison (deceased) and in 2005 Jon Beecher (MD) and Dougie Dudgeon (A&R) left the company and were replaced by Frederick Jude, a former employee of Palan Music Publishing and a Snapper director.

Included amongst the many artists the label has issued albums by are Anathema, Peter Andre, Cradle of Filth, No-Man, Ozric Tentacles, Pink Floyd, Porcupine Tree, Kenny Rogers, the Stooges, and W.A.S.P.

As well as having its own imprint, Snapper Music owns or distributes several labels that deal in a variety of genres of music: Peaceville (metal), Kscope (post-progressive), Madfish (classic and progressive rock), and for several years used to distribute Charly (R&B, jazz, progressive rock, and blues).

== See also ==
- List of record labels
