= Ed Wynne =

English guitarist and keyboardist (born 1961)

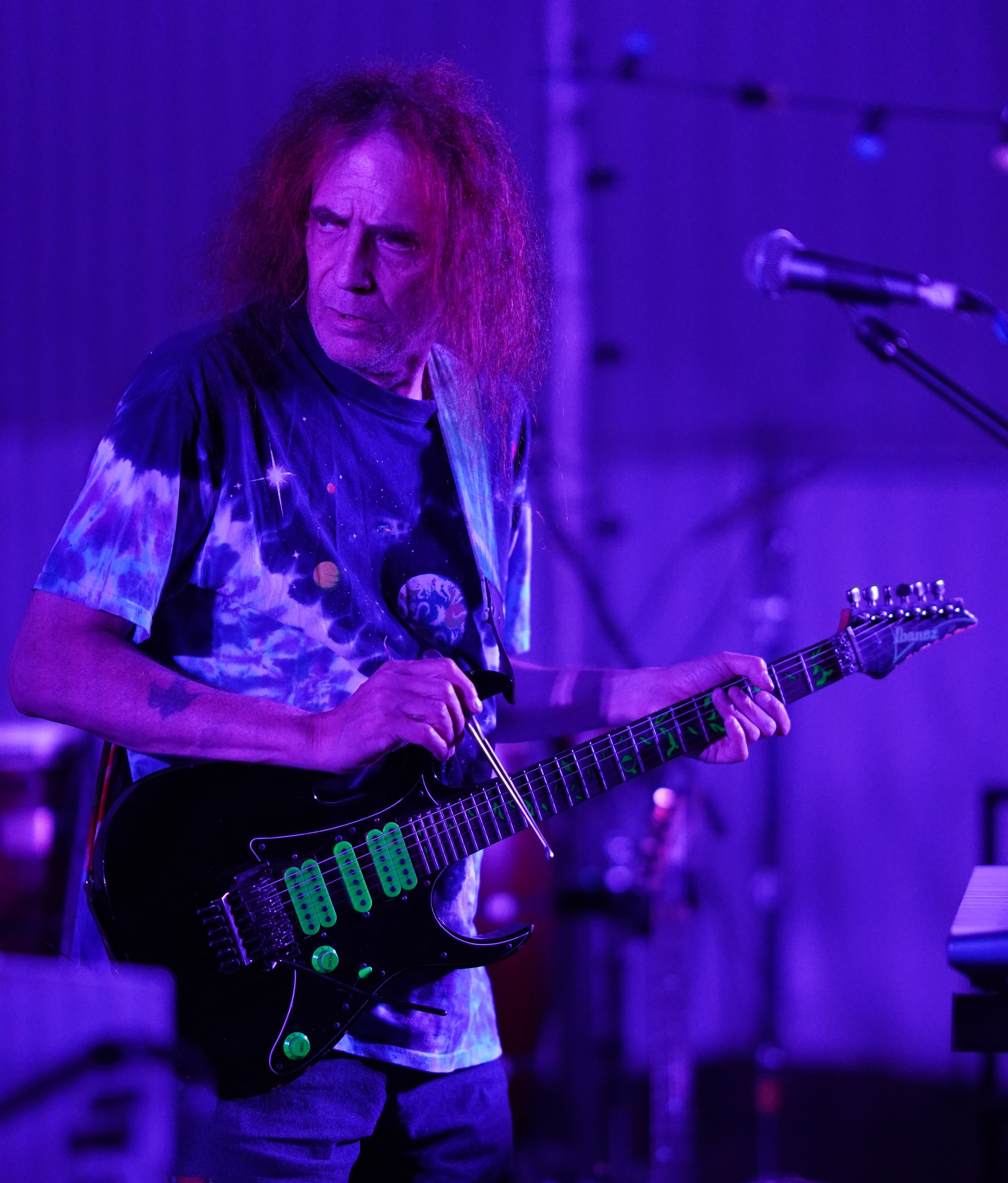
- Wynne performing in 2022

Background information
- Born: Edward Wynne; 3 June 1961 (age 65); Wandsworth, London, England
- Origin: Somerset, England
- Genres: Psychedelic rock, progressive rock, space rock, jazz fusion, instrumental rock, electronic music, dub, world music, ambient music
- Occupations: Musician, composer, record producer
- Instruments: Guitar, synthesizer, koto
- Years active: 1983–present
- Member of: Ozric Tentacles, Nodens Ictus

Edward Wynne (born 3 June 1961) is an English guitarist and keyboardist best known as a founding member, principal composer and the only constant member of psychedelic rock band Ozric Tentacles.

== Biography ==
Ed Wynne was born in Wandsworth, London, England, and is the son of English sculptor David Wynne, and the grandson of English author Joan Grant. George Harrison of The Beatles was a family friend, and encouraged a seven-year-old Wynne to pick up the guitar. Wynne's father regularly had big names in music, such as Jimi Hendrix and Donovan, stay over at the house. The family's emphasis on art and music allowed Wynne to achieve a wide range of musical appreciation, including Gong/Steve Hillage, Hawkwind, Kraan, Frank Zappa and Todd Rundgren. In addition to Hendrix, Hillage and Zappa, other guitarists who have influenced Wynne include Steve Vai, Joe Satriani and Guthrie Govan, who Wynne called "my favourite guitarist in the world at the moment" in 2021.

Wynne's lack of interest in school caused him to leave school at age 16. His parents encouraged him to follow his musical passion, and would instruct him to play sounds of nature on the piano. He was involved with several bands whilst in school, including Bolshem People, which recorded in Wynne's studio attic in Rushmere, Wimbledon Common. A track of theirs, "Erp Riff 83", can be heard on the compilation album A Psychedelic Psauna.

Wynne formed Ozric Tentacles in 1983 along with his brother Roly Wynne and other members at the Stonehenge Free Festival. The band was notable for blending rock music with jazz fusion, ambient dub, world music and electronic music, incorporating heavy usage of synthesizers and samplers. After several line-up changes, Ozric Tentacles started to be guided more and more by Wynne, who aside from guitar and keyboards was also becoming responsible for beat programming and other studio efforts. He has remained the only original member of the band. Since the 2000s, the band featured Wynne's ex-wife Brandi on bass, and son Silas Neptune on keyboards.

Wynne collaborated with Joie Hinton in Nodens Ictus, after being asked by the promoters of the Crypt club in Deptford, South London, to produce an ambient set for the club's "chillout" room. Wynne has also appeared as a guest musician in works by artists such as Jordan Rudess, Amon Düül UK, Eat Static, and Invisible System, among others. In 2007, he (along with ex-bandmate Merv Pepler) composed and programmed a track named "Sphere Wave's" for the Cognition Factor soundtrack.

In 2019, Wynne released his debut solo album, Shimmer into Nature. In 2022, he released his second solo album, Tumbling Through the Floativerse, in collaboration with Gre Vanderloo of Gracerooms.

== Equipment ==
Wynne's gear includes synthesizers such as Novation Supernova II, Korg M50, Roland S760, Roland Fantom XR, Roland D-50, Korg Wavestation EX, Korg Prophecy, Sequential Pro-1, guitars Ibanez JEM, Ibanez Artist, Ibanez EGEN18, Yamaha Acoustic, pedals Boss GT-3 and Boss GT-10, and Marshall Amplification.

== Discography ==
=== Solo albums ===
- Shimmer into Nature (2019)
- Tumbling Through the Floativerse (with Gre Vanderloo) (2022)

=== Nodens Ictus ===
- The Grove of Selves (1987)
- Spacelines (2000)
- The Cozmic Key (2017)
- Kozfest Live (2018)

=== Guest appearances ===
- Amon Düül UK – Die Lösung (1989)
- Jordan Rudess – The Road Home (2007)
- Eat Static – Back to Earth (2008)
- Invisible System – Street Clan (2011)
- Quantum Fantay – Dancing in Limbo (2015) & Oneironauts (2024)
- Keepers Brew - Constellation Automation (2016)
- Silas Neptune - The Scales of Tahuti (2017)
