= Jaro Medien =

German music company

Jaro Medien GmbH (Jaro Media) is a German music company founded in 1981. It books eclectic musical acts, as well as publishing and selling recordings.

== Artists ==
- Aquabella
- Arkady Shilkloper
- Betagarri
- Bremen Immigrant Orchestra
- Charles (Wuppertal)
- Charles Petersohn meets Jasper van't Hof
- Christian Kaiser
- Crash (Warsaw)
- Dona Rosa
- Farlanders
- Georgi Petrov
- Grace Yoon/Roman Bunka
- Hamlet Gonashvili
- Hannes Beckmann
- hartkamp
- Huun-Huur-Tu
- International Skoda Band
- Ivan Opium
- Jasper van't Hof (Piano solo)
- Jasper van't Hof HotLips
- Jasper van't Hof Quartett
- Jasper van't Hof's Pili-Pili
- Joachim-Ernst Berendt
- Johannes Cernota
- Johannes Cernota/Constanze Brüning
- Kayoko
- Toshinori Kondo
- La Voce
- Les Anges Compagnie
- Luis Di Matteo
- Mari Boine/Inna Zhelannaya/Sergey Starostin
- Meta Four
- Mikhail Alperin
- Moscow Art Trio
- müller (Hannover)
- Nusrath Fateh Ali Khan
- Okay Temiz Magnetic Band
- Oriental Wind/Okay Temiz
- Payuta
- Piirpauke
- Sarband
- Sergey Starostin's Vocal Family
- Julian Spizz
- Tam Echo Tam
- The Blech
- The Bulgarian Voices - Angelite
- The Shin
- Thomas Beckmann
- Thomas Beckmann/Johannes Cernota
- Trigon
- Trinovox
- Vladiswar Nadishana
- Warsaw Village Band
- Weitere Künstler
- Willy Schwarz

== See also ==
- List of record labels
