= Fly, Fly My Sadness =

1996 album featuring The Bulgarian Voices Angelite and Huun-Huur-Tu

Studio album by The Bulgarian Voices Angelite, Huun-Huur-Tu, Sergey Starostin and Mikhail Alperin
- Released: 1996
- Recorded: November 1995
- Studio: Ton Studio 2, Bulgarian National Television, Sofia
- Genre: Bulgarian folk music, Tuvan throat singing
- Length: 36:06
- Label: Jaro Medien

Fly, Fly My Sadness is a 1996 album made as a collaboration between The Bulgarian Voices Angelite, Huun-Huur-Tu, Sergey Starostin, and arranged by Mikhail Alperin. The album features a distinctive combination of Bulgarian folk choir and Tuvan throat singing.

== Background ==
Mikhail Alperin initially got inspired to record a fusion of two folk traditions in 1993, while on train touring with the Moscow Art Trio. Alperin had cassettes from a Russian folk choir and a traditional Tuvan throat singing group, and had an idea to play both tapes simultaneously. Alperin was impressed by this combination, and later recruited a Russian folk choir and Tuvan throat singing group (not Huun-Huur-Tu) to sing together, which was released as the album Prayer.

After this, Alperin heard the albums of Le Mystère des Voix Bulgares and was inspired again to record a fusion, this time between Tuvan and Bulgarian music. He recruited the all-male Huun-Huur-Tu and the all-female Bulgarian Voices Angelite, which formed in the early 1990s as a splinter group of Le Mystère. He stated: "Deep down we have the same ideas, moods, and a lot of similar background. I had imagined a fantastic idea to have a musical family where the Bulgarians represent the mother, the Tuvinians the father, with Russian son and Jewish brother." The Fly, Fly My Sadness group toured in Europe and America and recorded a second album.

While Alperin claimed in the album liner notes that Tuvan and Bulgarian culture share a Central Asian nomadic ancestry, this is inaccurate.

== Music ==
Huun-Huur-Tu consists of male singers, while The Bulgarian Voices Angelite consists of female singers. Musicologist Danielle Fosler-Lussier notes that the use of Tuvan overtone singing mimics natural phenomena, such as the singing of birds or the sound of steam. She notes "Legend” as a piece which keeps the Bulgarian and Tuvan groups relatively separate. In contrast, "Lonely Bird" has the two groups mixed together and less in traditional forms, using non-lexical vocables like "ah" and "doo" rather than words. In "Wave", the Bulgarian Voices improvise a two note vocal pattern on top of an arrangement.

Anthropologist Carol Silverman described the album as part of a trend of marketing Eastern music as "exotic" or "mystical" to western audiences, and that the original text of some songs was lost in the process of mixing the two vocal groups.

Professional ratings
Review scores
Source	Rating
Allmusic	4.5/5 stars

== Track listing ==
All tracks arranged by Mikhail Alperin

1. "Fly, Fly My Sadness" – 7:47
2. "Legend" – 7:41
3. "Wave" – 7:24
4. "Lonely Bird" – 10:58,
5. "Mountain Story" – 10:16

== Personnel ==
- The Bulgarian Voices Angelite – choir
- Nikolai Merdjanow – conductor for The Bulgarian Voices Angelite
- Huun-Huur-Tu – vocals, instruments
- Mikhail Alperin – musical director, conductor, mixer, grand piano, melodica, voice, cowbell, liner notes
- Fly, Fly My Sadness – vocals, clarinet, folk reeds
- Ulrich Balss – producer
- Borislav Borissov – recorder
- Erik Lautwald – mixer
