= Russia in the Eurovision Song Contest 1996 =

- Eurovision Song Contest 1996
- Country: Russia
- Selection process: Pesnya dlya Evropy
- Selection date: 2 March 1996

Competing entry
- Song: "Ya eto ya"
- Artist: Andrey Kosinsky
- Songwriters: Andrey Kosinsky; Nikolay Denisov

Placement
- Final result: Failed to qualify (26th)

Participation chronology

Russia attempted to participate in the Eurovision Song Contest 1996 with the song "Ya eto ya", written by Andrey Kosinsky and Nikolay Denisov, and performed by Kosinsky. The Russian entry was selected through a national final, organised by the Russian broadcaster Rossiya Channel (RTR). Kosinsky was chosen to represent Russia with the song "Ya eto ya". However, Russia was one of seven countries which failed to qualify for the Eurovision final from a pre-qualifying round, so they were not present in Norway.

== Background ==
Prior to the 1996 contest, Russia had participated in the Eurovision Song Contest two times since its first entry in 1994. To this point, the country's best placing was ninth, which it achieved in 1994 with the song "Vechny strannik" performed by Youddiph. Russia's least successful result was in 1995 when it placed 17th with the song "Kolybelnaya dlya vulkana" by Philipp Kirkorov, receiving 17 points in total. The Russian participation in the contest alternates between two broadcasters: RTR and ORT. The Russian broadcaster for the 1996 contest, who broadcasts the event in Russia and organises the selection process for its entry, was RTR. RTR confirmed their intentions to participate in the contest on 7 February 1996. Along with their participation confirmation, it was announced that RTR would organise a national final to select the 1996 Russian entry.

== Before Eurovision ==
=== Pesnya dlya Evropy ===
Pesnya dlya Evropy (English: A Song for Europe), retroactively often referred to as Nacionalny Otbor na Evrovidenie 1996 (English: National Selection for Eurovision 1996) was the national final format developed by RTR in order to select Russia's entry for the Eurovision Song Contest 1996. The final was held on 2 March 1996 at Shabolovka Studios in Moscow during the television programme Programma A, hosted by 1994 Russian entrant Youddiph and broadcast on RTR. The winner was chosen by an expert jury panel, headed by Alla Pugacheva, who would later represent Russia in the 1997 contest.

==== Format ====
The competition featured fourteen entries where the Russian entry for Oslo was selected by a sixteen-member jury panel (eight professionals and eight representatives of the public). Each juror represents a specific profession and age category. Each juror gives 1 point to his/her one, two or three favorite entry/entries. The summation of the jury scores determined the winning entry. The jury panel consisted of:

- Tatyana Nikolayeva – head of entertainment at RTR (jury chairperson, non-voting) (Note: Nikolayeva only had the right to vote in case of a tie for the first place)
- Galina Golubova – editor-in-chief of the information and music agency "Turne"
- Roman Prygunov – director of video clips
- Irina Otieva – singer, composer
- Yuri Yagudin – arranger, sound engineer
- Tatyana Cherednychenko – Doctor of Art History, musicologist
- Pavel Ovsyannikov – People's Artist of Russia, composer
- Alla Pugacheva – singer, composer, People's Artist of the Soviet Union
- Alexey Rybnikov – Honored Art Worker of Russia, composer
- Galina Masharova – Student of the law faculty
- Mikhail Sevastopolsky – interpreter
- Inga Voronovskaya – Leading Specialist of the Control Accounts Chamber of Moscow
- Igor Stepanov – commercial director of the real estate agency "Amalgam"
- Nadezhda Kobryzhenkova – housewife
- Petr Gorovoy – officer
- Natalia Samoylova – pensioner
- Gennady Videnko – builder

==== Competing entries ====
On 7 February 1996, RTR opened the submission period for interested artists and composers to submit their entries until 28 February. Artists and composers were required to possess Russian citizenship. All submitted songs were required to be performed in Russian. A panel of experts appointed by RTR selected 14 entries for the competition from the received submissions.

==== Final ====
The final took place on 2 March 1996. Fourteen songs competed and the winner, "Ya eto ya" performed by Andrey Kosinsky, was selected solely by a jury voting. Prior to the competition, a draw for the running order took place on 1 March 1996. In addition to the performances of the competing entries, Youddiph, Gilles Apap, Tamara Gverdtsiteli and cabaret-duo "Akademiya" (Lolita Milyavskaya and Aleksandr Tsekalo) performed as guests and a music video for Philipp Kirkorov's "Zayka" was premiered.

Final – 2 March 1996
R/O	Artist	Song	Place
1	Vladimir Trushin	"Drugaya" (Другая)	11
2	Tatyana Anisemova	"Voyennaya kolybelnaya" (Военная колыбельная)	8
3	Felix	"Serebryanniy veter" (Серебрянный ветер)	13
4	Zhanna Dobrovolskaya	"Veruyu v lyubov" (Верую в любовь)	5
5	Sergey Rogozin and Terem Kvartet	"Igray sudba" (Играй судьба)	6
6	Vokal Band	"Musyka plus" (Музыка плюс)	7
7	Olga Dzusova	"Zheltie babochki" (Желтые бабочки)	10
8	Inna Zhelannaya	"Letai" (Летай)	9
9	Timur Gorsky	"Nekrasivaya" (Некрасивая)	12
10	Nogu Svelo!	"Moskovskiy romans" (Московский романс)	3
11	Lisa Myalik	"Zemlya moya" (Земля моя)	4
12	Elena Kuzmina	"Veterki" (Ветерки)	2
13	Andrey Kosinsky	"Ya eto ya" (Я это я)	1
14	Viktoria Vita	"Belye gory" (Белые горы)	14

=== Controversy ===
The song "Nekrasivaya" was later accused of plagiarism from 1967 song of the same name, composed by Sergey Popov. Initially, Popov, for unknown reasons, was not going to sue Timur Gorsky, who performed the song at the national final and Leonid Velichkovsky, who was declared the author of the music. However, Popov ultimately decided to sue both Gorsky and Velichkovsky, but eventually lost the trial, despite the fact that the court recognized Popov as the legitimate author of the song. The reason for the loss was that "It is not possible to find out who put Gorsky and Velichkovsky as authors."

== At Eurovision ==
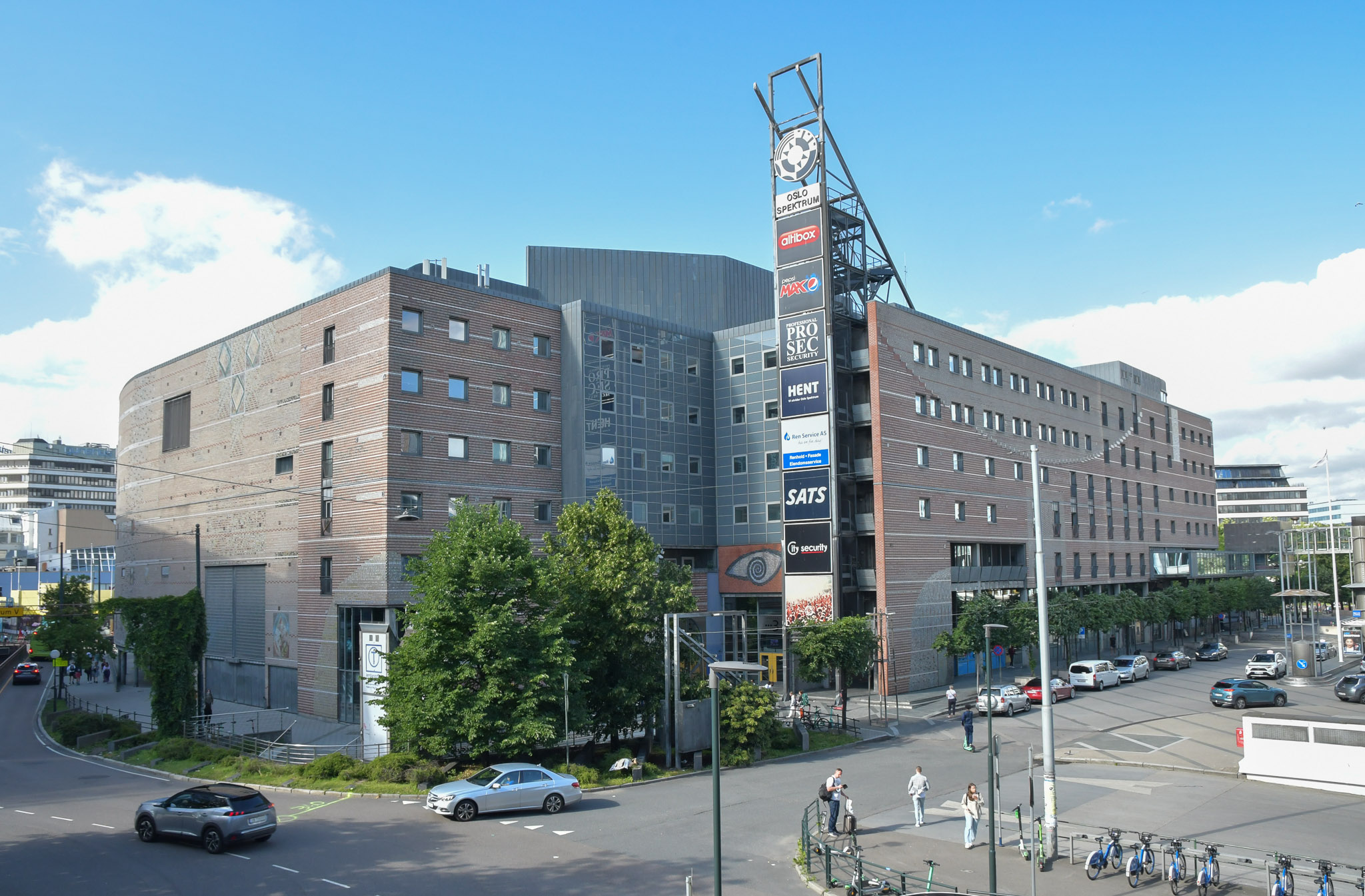
The Eurovision Song Contest 1996 took place at the Oslo Spektrum in Oslo, Norway, on 18 May 1996.

The Eurovision Song Contest 1996 took place at the Oslo Spektrum in Oslo, Norway, on 18 May 1996. According to the Eurovision rules, the 23-country participant list for the contest was composed of: the previous year's winning country and host nation Norway and the twenty-two countries which had obtained the highest number of points in the special qualifying round. Russia placed joint 26th with 14 points in the qualifying round and thus was eliminated from the contest.

=== Voting ===
In the qualifying round, national juries in all competing countries, including Norway, which received an automatic right to compete in the final and thus exempt from the round, listened to the submitted entries on audio tape, with juries required to listen to all songs three times before voting. Each of the eight members on each country's jury awarded their favourite song twelve points, their second-favourite ten points, their third-favourite eight points, with subsequent points being awarded consecutively down to each juror's tenth-favourite song being awarded one point, with the points awarded by all jurors being totalled to determine each country's top ten songs which were awarded points in the same manner.

Points awarded to Russia (qualifying round)
Score	Country
12 points	
10 points	
8 points	
7 points	
6 points	
5 points	Switzerland; United Kingdom
4 points	Estonia
3 points	
2 points	
1 point	

Points awarded by Russia (qualifying round)
Score	Country
12 points	Estonia
10 points	Poland
8 points	Iceland
7 points	Ireland
6 points	Sweden
5 points	Greece
4 points	Cyprus
3 points	Malta
2 points	Slovenia
1 point	Croatia
