= Sergey Starostin =

Russian folk/jazz composer and performer

Sergey Starostin Сергей Николаевич Старостин
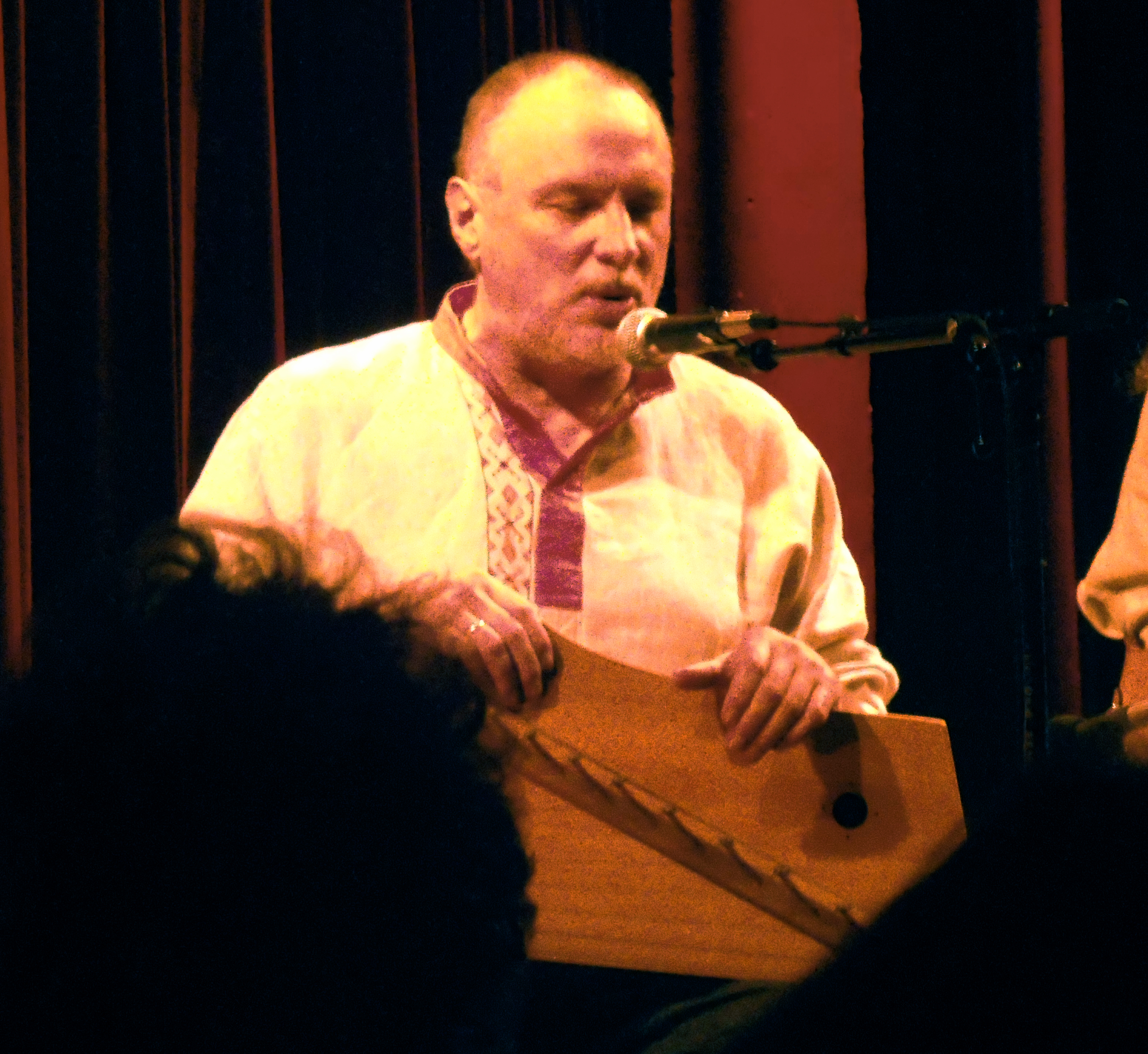
- Starostin in 2011

Background information
- Born: Sergey Nikolaevich Starostin; 1 January 1956 (age 70); Moscow
- Origin: Moscow, Russia
- Genres: Russian folk; jazz
- Occupations: Musician, composer
- Instruments: kalyuka; overtone flute; svirel; pyzhatka; gusli

Sergey Nikolaevich Starostin (Russian: Сергей Николаевич Старостин; born 1 January 1956 in Moscow) is a Russian folk and jazz composer and performer of Sámi and Tuvan folk music. He sings and plays the kalyuka, overtone flute, svirel, pyzhatka, reed instruments and gusli.

== Biography ==
In his early childhood, Starostin sang in a boys choir led by Vadim Sudakov. He started to play clarinet in school, and later graduated from Merzlyakov college of music, and then from the Moscow Conservatory. After graduation, he switched to playing folk instruments. By mid-90s, he collaborated with jazz musicians Mikhail Alperin and Arkady Shilkloper, forming a Moscow Art Trio group, and mixing together jazz and traditional music. In his songs, Starostin avoids harmonising, staying within certain scales rather than sticking to chord patterns, which makes jazz played this way more "compatible" with traditional folk music. As of 2011, Starostin moved from jazz and rock compositions back to traditional folk performances.

He participated in folk music research expeditions, and recorded thousands of songs. In 1991, Starostin produced a series of TV programs called World Village, and as of 2008, runs a different program named Wanderings of a musician on Russia-K. In 2006, he worked as a producer for the animated feature film Prince Vladimir.

While many CDs and concert programs feature Starostin playing "Rozhok", it worth mentioning that actually he plays not the folk wooden trumpet, known as a Rozhok, but a "Tverskoy Rozhok", which is a reed instrument, is also known as zhaleyka.

== Selected discography ==
- Fly, Fly My Sadness (1996) - together with Angelite - The Bulgarian Voices, Huun-Huur-Tu and Mikhail Alperin
- XIX98 (1998) - with Mikhail Alperin, Arkady Shilkloper and Vladimir Volkov
- Prayer (1998) - with Mikhail Alperin and Arkady Shilkloper
- Much Better (1998) - with Volkovtrio, Arkady Shilkloper, Igor Butman, Kaigal-Ool Khovalyg and others
- Once There Was Sun (2000)
- Neath The Moon So Bright (2001) - with Vladimir Volkov and Svyatoslav Kurashov
- DOM concert (2007)
- Душеполезные Песни На Каждый День (2008) - with Andrey Kotov, Vladimir Volkov and Leonid Fedorov
- Хождение по Лукам (2009) - with Vladimir Volkov and Svyatoslav Kurashov
