= Moscow Art Trio =

Russian-Ukrainian musical trio

- Origin: Moscow, Russia
- Genres: Classical; Jazz; Traditional music
- Years active: 1990–present
- Label: Jaro Medien
- Members: Arkady Shilkloper; Sergey Starostin
- Past members: Misha Alperin (died in May 2018)
- Website: Moscow Art Trio on Myspace

Moscow Art Trio (established in 1990) is a Russian trio comprising Arkady Shilkloper (French horn & flugelhorn), Misha Alperin (piano & vocals) and Sergey Starostin (vocals, clarinet & folkreeds), performing in the Classical/Jazz/Traditional music genres.

The trio's leader, Mikhail Alperin, also composed its music. He lived near Oslo, Norway since 1993, and became a central figure in new improvised music of the far North, until his death in May 2018.

The trio has appeared at festivals and musical events around the world.

== Discography ==
- 1993 Prayer (Jaro Medien)
- 1995 Folk Dreams (Jaro Medien)
- 1996: Hamburg Concert (Jaro Medien)
- 1998: Live In Karlsruhe (Boheme Music)
- 1998: Mountain Tale (Jaro Medien), with Angelite (The Bulgarian Voices Angelite) & Huun-Huur-Tu
- 1998: Music (Jaro Medien), with Hans-Kristian Kjos Sørensen (percussion)
- 2000: Moscow Art Trio (Boheme Music)
- 2001: Once Upon A Time (Jaro Medien), with Eli Kristin Hovdsveen Hagen (vocals)
- 2006: Instead Of Making Children (Jaro Medien)
- 2008: Village Variations (Jaro Medien), with The Norwegian Chamber Orchestra)
- 2010 Legend (Jaro Medien) with Angelite (The Bulgarian Voices Angelite) & Huun-Huur-Tu
