= Pyzhatka =

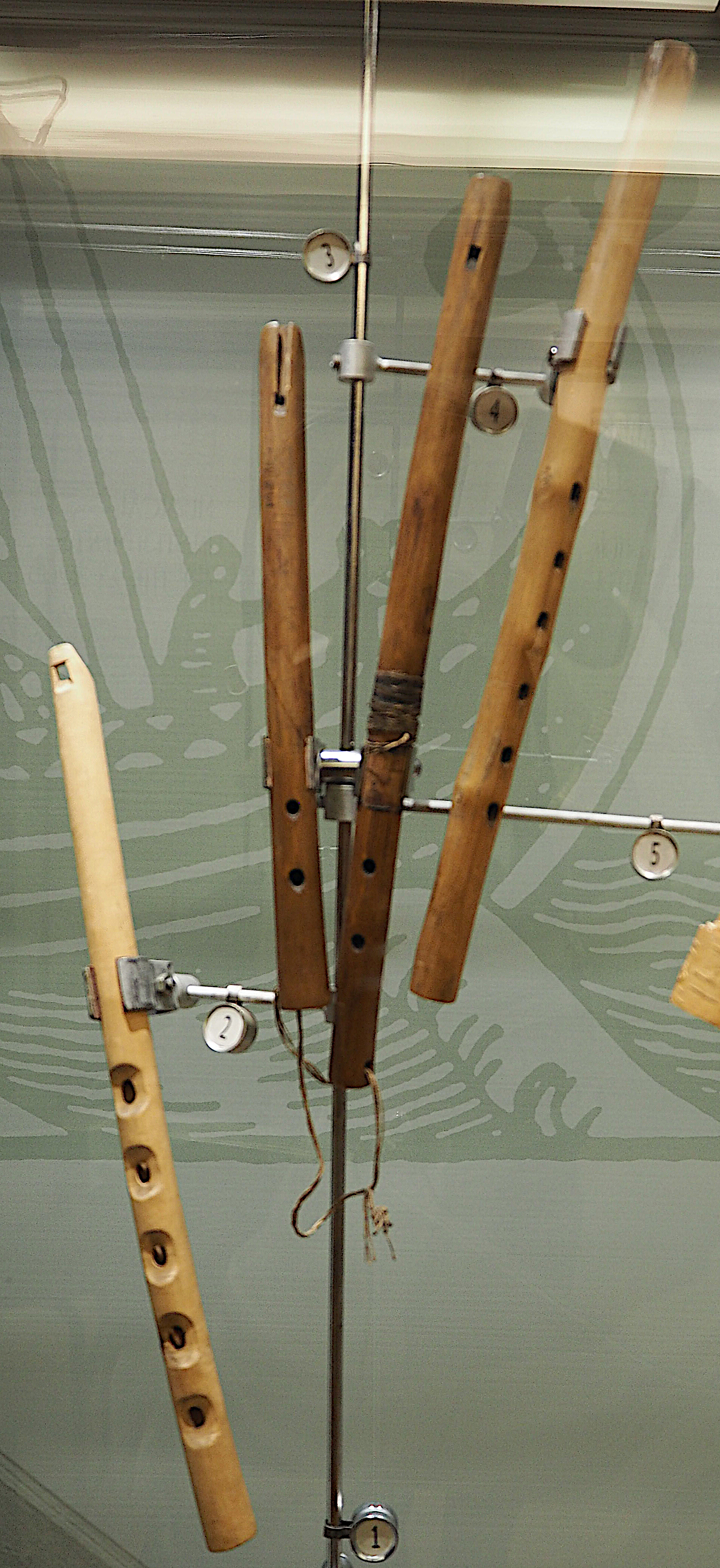
From the left dudka, dudka dvoychatka (a pair), and pyzhatka (all can be categorized svirel, flutes)

The Pyzhatka (Russian: Пыжатка) is a Russian folk musical instrument, a wooden flute, traditional for the Kursk Oblast.

Pyzhatka is made of a wooden tube, 15–25 mm in diameter and 40–70 cm long, one side of which is closed with a wad (Pyzh in Russian). The wad has an oblique incision on it, which leads the air on a sharp edge of a square opening, forming a whistle like that of a recorder. Unlike in the majority whistle flutes, though, the whistle of pyzhatka is then wound with a waxed thread, which gives the instrument a peculiar hissing sound. The flute has 6 finger holes (3 for the right, and 3 for the left hand), which covers one full octave. To make the sound better, the pyzhatka flute is usually moistened before play, as it seals the holes and makes the notes clearer.

Other local alternative names for pyzhatka include pazhatka, puzhatka, pikla, or travyanka.
