= Her First Dance =

Studio album by Misha Alperin
- Released: February 12, 2008
- Recorded: July 2006
- Studio: Rainbow Studio; Oslo, Norway
- Genre: Jazz
- Length: 48:39
- Label: ECM; ECM 1995
- Producer: Manfred Eicher

Misha Alperin chronology
| Blue Fjord (2004) | Her First Dance (2008) |

Her First Dance is an album by pianist Misha Alperin recorded for ECM in July 2006 and released on February 12, 2008. Alperin's trio features Arkady Shilkloper on horns and cellist Anja Lechner.

== Reception ==
The AllMusic review by Thom Jurek awarded the album 4 stars stating "This is a beautiful recording and perhaps, as idiosyncratic as it is, Alperin's finest moment for ECM yet."

Professional ratings
Review scores
| Source | Rating |
|---|---|
| AllMusic | 4/5 stars |

== Track listing ==
All compositions by Mikhail Alperin except as indicated

1. "Vayan" – 6:12
2. "Her First Dance" – 5:16
3. "A New Day" – 3:23
4. "April in February" – 2:39
5. "Jump" – 3:24
6. "Tiflis" – 6:00
7. "Lonely in White" – 4:28
8. "Frozen Tears" – 5:25
9. "The Russian Song" (Arkady Shilkloper) – 4:31
10. "Via Dolorosa" – 7:21

== Personnel ==
- Mikhail Alperin – piano
- Arkady Shilkloper – French horn, flugelhorn
- Anja Lechner – cello
