= North Story =

Studio album by Misha Alperin
- Released: 1996
- Recorded: September 1995
- Studio: Rainbow Studio; Oslo, Norway
- Genre: Jazz
- Length: 59:45
- Label: ECM; ECM 1596
- Producer: Manfred Eicher

Misha Alperin chronology
Prayer (1996)	North Story (1996)	First Impression (1997)

North Story is an album by Ukrainian-Norwegian jazz pianist Misha Alperin recorded in September 1995 and released on ECM the following year. The quintet features horn section Arkady Shilkloper and Tore Brunborg and rhythm section Terje Gewelt and Jon Christensen.

== Reception ==
Professional ratings
Review scores
Source	Rating
AllMusic	4/5 stars

The AllMusic review by David R. Adler awarded the album 4 stars calling it a "set of mysterious original compositions... Combining Russian folk, modern classical, and free jazz influences.

== Track listing ==
All compositions by Mikhail Alperin except as indicated

1. "Morning" - 6:39
2. "Psalm No. 1" - 7:34
3. "Ironical Evening" - 8:06
4. "Alone" - 4:42
5. "Afternoon" - 9:22
6. "Psalm No. 2" - 6:59
7. "North Story" - 5:27
8. "Etude" - 6:35
9. "Kristi-Blodsdråper (Fucsia)" (Harald Sæverud) - 4:35

== Personnel ==
- Mikhail Alperin – piano
- Arkady Shilkloper – French horn, fluegelhorn
- Tore Brunborg – tenor saxophone
- Terje Gewelt – double bass
- Jon Christensen – drums
