= Hamlet Gonashvili =

Georgian singer (1928–1985)

Hamlet Gonashvili ჰამლეტ გონაშვილი
- Born: 20 June 1928; Anaga, Georgian SSR, Soviet Union
- Died: 25 July 1985 (aged 57) Anaga, Georgian SSR, Soviet Union
- Genres: Classical
- Occupation: Singer
- Instrument: Singing
- Years active: 1953–1985

Hamlet Dimitris dze Gonashvili (Note: Georgian: ჰამლეტ დიმიტრის ძე გონაშვილი, romanized: Hamlet’ Dimit’ris dze Gonashvili; Russian: Гамлет Дмитриевич Гонашвили, romanized: Gamlet Dmitriyevich Gonashvili) (20 June 1928 – 25 July 1985), sometimes referred to as The Voice of Georgia, was a Georgian singer (tenor), influential teacher and performer of Georgian folk music.

Gonashvili was born in eastern Georgia and is considered the best interpreter of songs from the Kartli and Kakheti regions. He was a recipient of many national honours and prizes. The Third Symphony of the Georgian composer Giya Kancheli drew inspiration from Gonashvili's singing, and he was himself the soloist in the first recording of the work (Olympia Records, 1979). He died in 1985, at the height of his fame, as the result of a fall from an apple tree. Hamlet (JARO, 1996) is a collection of his most impressive songs. He is buried at Didube Pantheon.
