= Alyans (band) =

Soviet Union musical band

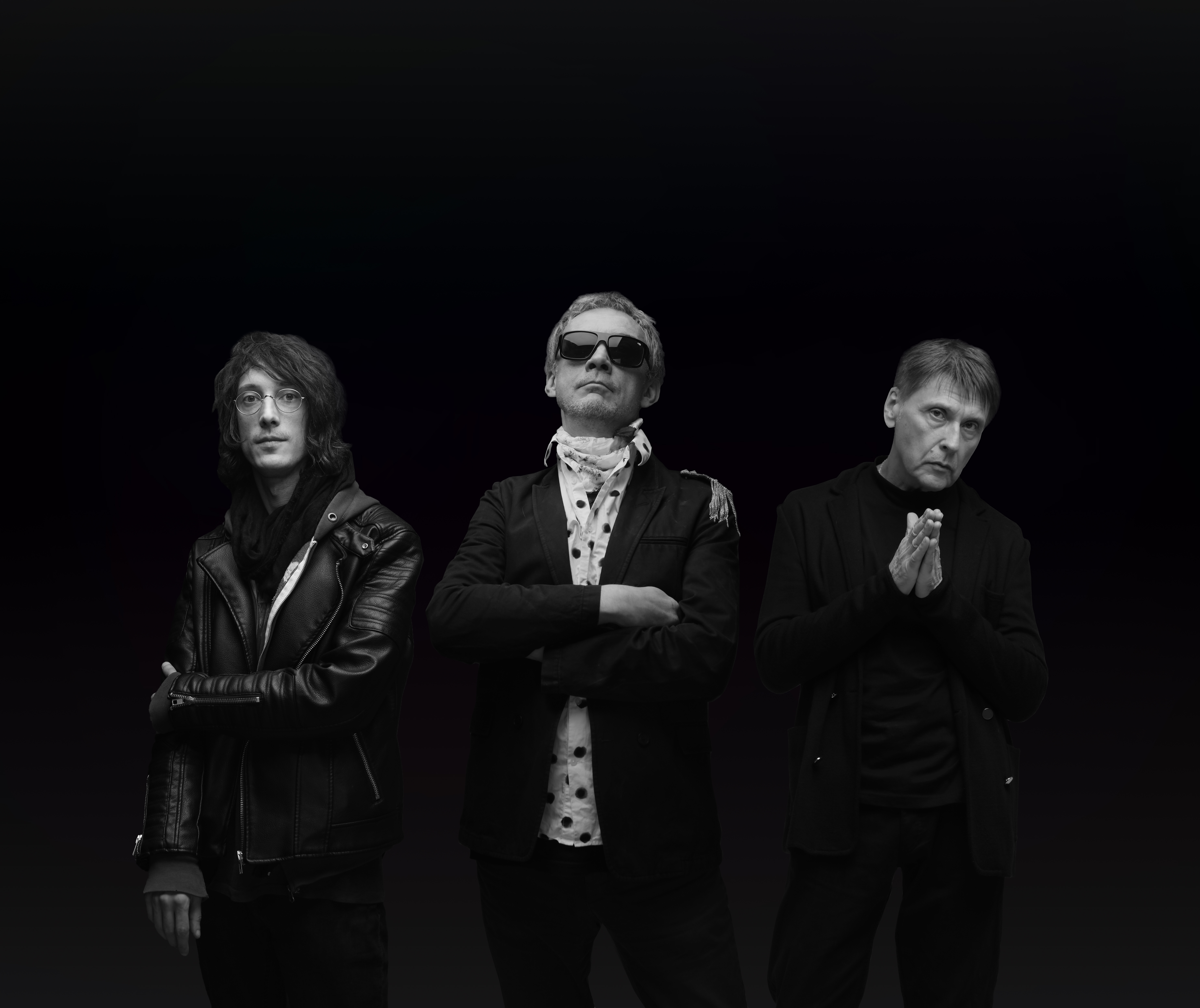
- From left to right: Mitya Zhuravlev, Igor Zhuravlev, Andrei Tumanov

Background information
- Also known as: Alliance
- Origin: Moscow, Russian SFSR, Soviet Union
- Genres: New wave, rock
- Years active: 1981–1984; 1986–1993; 2008–present
- Label: Maschina Records
- Past members: Sergey Volodin; Konstantin Gavrilov; Yuri Kistenev; Maxim Trefan; Inna Zhelannaya; Oleg Parastaev

Alyans (Russian: Альянс) or Alliance is a Soviet and Russian rock band formed in 1981 by Igor Zhuravlev, Kostya Gavrilov, Oleg Parastayev and Andrey Tumanov. The band is best known for the 1987 single "Na zare" (Russian: «На заре», lit. 'At dawn').

== History ==
=== Early years (1981–1984) ===
Alyans was formed in 1981 in Moscow at the initiative of guitarist Sergei Volodin. The group initially included Igor Zhuravlev on vocals and guitar, Andrey Tumanov on bass, and Vladimir Ryabov on drums. The group's formation coincided with the beginning of the new wave movement in the Soviet Union. At this time, Alyans played ska and reggae as well as cover versions of Debbie Harry, the Police, The B-52s.

At the end of 1982, sound engineer Igor Zamaraev heard Alyans at the rock festival "Fiztekh - 1982" (Russian: «Физтех — 1982») in Dolgoprudny and suggested recording an album. The band's first album, Kukla (Russian: «Кукла», lit. 'Doll'), was recorded in 1983 with Zamaraev's assistance. This album contains initial versions of later hits that were re-recorded and included on the 1984 albumYa medlenno uchilsya zhit' (Russian: «Я медленно учился жить», lit. 'I slowly learned to live'). At the same festival, the members of Alyans met the artistic director of the Kostroma Philharmonic, who offered them professional work. A couple of weeks later, Alyans left for Kostroma, with a line-up of Igor Zhuravlev (guitar, vocals), Andrey Tumanov (bass), Sergey Volodin (guitar) and Pavel Chinyakov (drums). The group went on tour under the name Kudesniki (Russian: «Кудесники», lit. 'Wizards'), since the philharmonic's warehouse had unused posters from another group called Kudesniki, which had broken up several months prior to the tour. During the tour, the group performed the songs that they had performed at the festival at the Moscow Institute of Physics and Technology. After concerts in the town of Buy, a commission from Moscow removed Alyans from the tour, citing “the lack of effectiveness of the program”. A deal with Kostroma Philharmonic was continued but 83' Spring tour was cancelled due to Volodin busyness. In the fall of 1984, the group was included in a list of bands prohibited from performing live. As a result of being blacklisted, Alyans was disbanded.

=== Reformation (1986–1993) ===
In the fall of 1986, the group appeared in public at the Forum of Creative Youth in the Metelitsa cafe, after which it entered the Moscow Rock Laboratory. Its composition: Igor Zhuravlev (vocals, guitar), Oleg Parastaev (keys), Andrey Tumanov (bass) and Konstantin Gavrilov (keys, programming). In February 1987, Alyans became the laureate of the first rock laboratory “Festival of Hopes”. The group performed songs such as “Na Zare”, “Get a Fire”, and “False Start”. The band participated in "Rock-panorama-87" festival and began to work with "SPM Record" label and with Stas Namin.

The band composed of Zhuravlev and Parastaev lasted until 1988, when it broke up due Zhuravlev deciding to radically change the sound of the band to rock music, which Parastaev, who planned to continue working in the spirit of the “new wave”, opposed and left the band, collecting his own project “New Russian Group” a.k.a. “NRG”) (Russian: Новая русская группа, НРГ). Soon, drummer Yuri Kistenev joined the group, which completed the transformation of Alyans into a rock group. A year later, Sergey Kalachev replaced Andrei Tumanov on bass.

In 1990, "Alyans" performs at Luzhniki Stadium along with Kino, Bioconstructor, Joanna Stingray and Lyube. and tours across the Europe Later the singer Inna Zhelannaya joined the group. Together, they made several concert programs (participating in "Clear Water Rock" festival) and recorded the album "Made in White". Alyans at that time comprised: Zhuravlev, Maxim Trefan (keyboards, ex - “Polite Refusal”), Yuri “Khen” Kistenev (drums), Konstantin “Castello” Baranov (guitar, ex - “Nikolai Copernicus”), Sergey “Grebstel” Kalachev (bass), Vladimir “Miss” Missarzhevsky (percussion, ex - “Meeting On the Elbe”).

=== Reunions (1994–2008) ===
In January 1994, Alliance musicians formed the Farlanders group, led by Inna Zhelannaya, which included Yuri "Khen" Kistenev (drums), Sergey "Grebstel" Kalachev (bass), as well as Sergey Starostin and Sergey Klevensky.

=== Modern age (2008–present) ===
From 2008, Alyans has regularly given concerts in Moscow clubs, sometimes in different line-ups, based on Igor Zhuravlev and Andrey Tumanov.

In 2018, the ex-keyboardist of the group Oleg Parastaev created a channel on YouTube. In April 2019, Parastaev published a video for the song “At Dawn,” filmed in 1987 which became a viral hit on the internet. In the same month, the album “Wanna Fly!” (Russian: Хочу летать!, lit. 'Hachu letat'!') was released, which was the first release of the team in the last 25 years.

On 14 February 2020, the group released the album "Space Dreams" (Russian: Космические сны, lit. 'Kosmicheskiye sny') with music videos for "Space Dreams" and "Hey, Man, Superman".

On 20 June 2020, Oleg Parastaev died at the age of 61.

In October 2023, the band performed at Moscow's "16 Tonnes" (Russian: 16 тонн) club, supporting the release of the new single "Look, don't touch it!".

== Discography ==
| Translation | Original title | Transliterated title | Year | Annotation |
|---|---|---|---|---|
| Alliance-83 / Doll | «Альянс-83» / «Кукла» | Kukla | 1983 | samizdat; re-released as a part of Ya medlenno uchilsya zhit expanded edition |
| Alliance-84 / I slowly learned to live | «Альянс-84» / «Я медленно учился жить» | Ya medlenno uchilsya zhit | 1984 | samizdat; re-released in 2020 |
| Alliance-87 / Get a fire | «Альянс-87» / «Дайте огня» | Dayte ognya | 1987 | samizdat; re-released in 2018 |
| Made in white | «Сделано в белом» | Sdelano v belom | 1992 | re-released in 2021 |
| Wanna fly! | «Хочу летать!» | Hochu letat'! | 2019 | |
| Space dreams | «Космические сны» | Kosmicheskiye snuy | 2020 | re-released in 2021 |
| Enough! | «Полно!» | Polno! | 2023 | EP |

== See also ==
- Music of the Soviet Union
