= Wave of Sorrow =

Studio album by Mikhail Alperin & Arkady Shilkloper
- Released: 1990
- Recorded: July 1989
- Genre: Jazz
- Length: 46:53
- Label: ECM; ECM 1396
- Producer: Manfred Eicher

Mikhail Alperin chronology
Wave of Sorrow (1990)	Folk Dreams (1995)

Wave of Sorrow is an album by Soviet-Norwegian jazz pianist Mikhail Alperin and Russian brass player Arkady Shilkloper recorded in July 1989 and released on ECM the following year.

== Reception ==
Professional ratings
Review scores
Source	Rating
AllMusic	4/5 stars
The Penguin Guide to Jazz	2.5/4 stars

The AllMusic review by David R. Adler awarded the album four stars, describing it as "An evocative, lyrical recording.... The two draw heavily on Slavic folk influences, even as they mine the kind of airy, contemplative jazz harmonies associated with the ECM school."

The Penguin Guide to Jazz found the album attractive but predictable and inconsequential.

== Track listing ==
All compositions by Mikhail Alperin

1. "Song" - 6:35
2. "Poem" - 4:23
3. "Wave of Sorrow" - 6:23
4. "Toccata" - 5:15
5. "Unisons" - 4:29
6. "Introduction and Dance in 7/4" - 4:32
7. "Short Story" - 4:57
8. "Prelude in B-flat Minor" - 5:33
9. "Miniature" - 4:17
10. "Epilogue" - 1:15

== Personnel ==
- Mikhail Alperin – piano, melodica, voice
- Arkady Shilkloper – French horn, jagdhorn, fluegelhorn, voice
