= Kayoko =

- Gender: Female
- Language: Japanese

Origin
- Origin: Japan
- Meaning: Secrets, or (one full of secrets); child of a good generation (加代子); child of a flowering generation (花代子); child of a beautiful generation (佳代子)

Other names
- Nickname: Kayo

Kayoko is a feminine Japanese given name. Notable people with the name include:

- Kayoko Fujii (藤井 佳代子; born 1961), Japanese actress and voice actress
- Kayoko Fukuoka (福岡 加余子; born 1949), Japanese former professional tennis player
- Kayoko Fukushi (福士 加代子; born 1982), Japanese long-distance runner
- Kayoko Haruyama (春山 香代子; born 1979), Japanese retired professional wrestler
- Kayoko Hashiguchi-Saka (坂 佳代子; born 1944), Japanese gymnast
- Kayoko Hoshino (星野 佳代子; born 1949), Japanese ceramicist
- Kayoko Kawahigashi (川東 加代子; born 1958), Japanese former international table tennis player
- Kayoko Kishimoto (岸本 加世子; born 1960), Japanese actress
- Kayoko Kumono (雲野 かよ子; 1908-1991), Japanese former member of the Takarazuka Revue
- Kayoko Obata (小幡 佳代子; born 1971), Japanese long-distance runner
- Kayoko Okubo (大久保 佳代子; born 1971), Japanese comedian, tarento and actress
- Kayoko Shibata (柴田 かよこ; born 1980), Japanese actress, singer, and model
- Kayoko Shimizu (清水 嘉与子; born 1935), Japanese politician and nurse
- Kayoko Shiraishi (白石 加代子; born 1941), Japanese stage actress
- Kayoko Sugiyama (杉山 加代子; born 1961), Japanese former volleyball player

== Fictional characters ==
- Kayoko Kotohiki, a character in Battle Royale
- Kayoko Onikata, a character in Blue Archive
