= Inna Zhelannaya =

Russian singer-songwriter (born 1965)

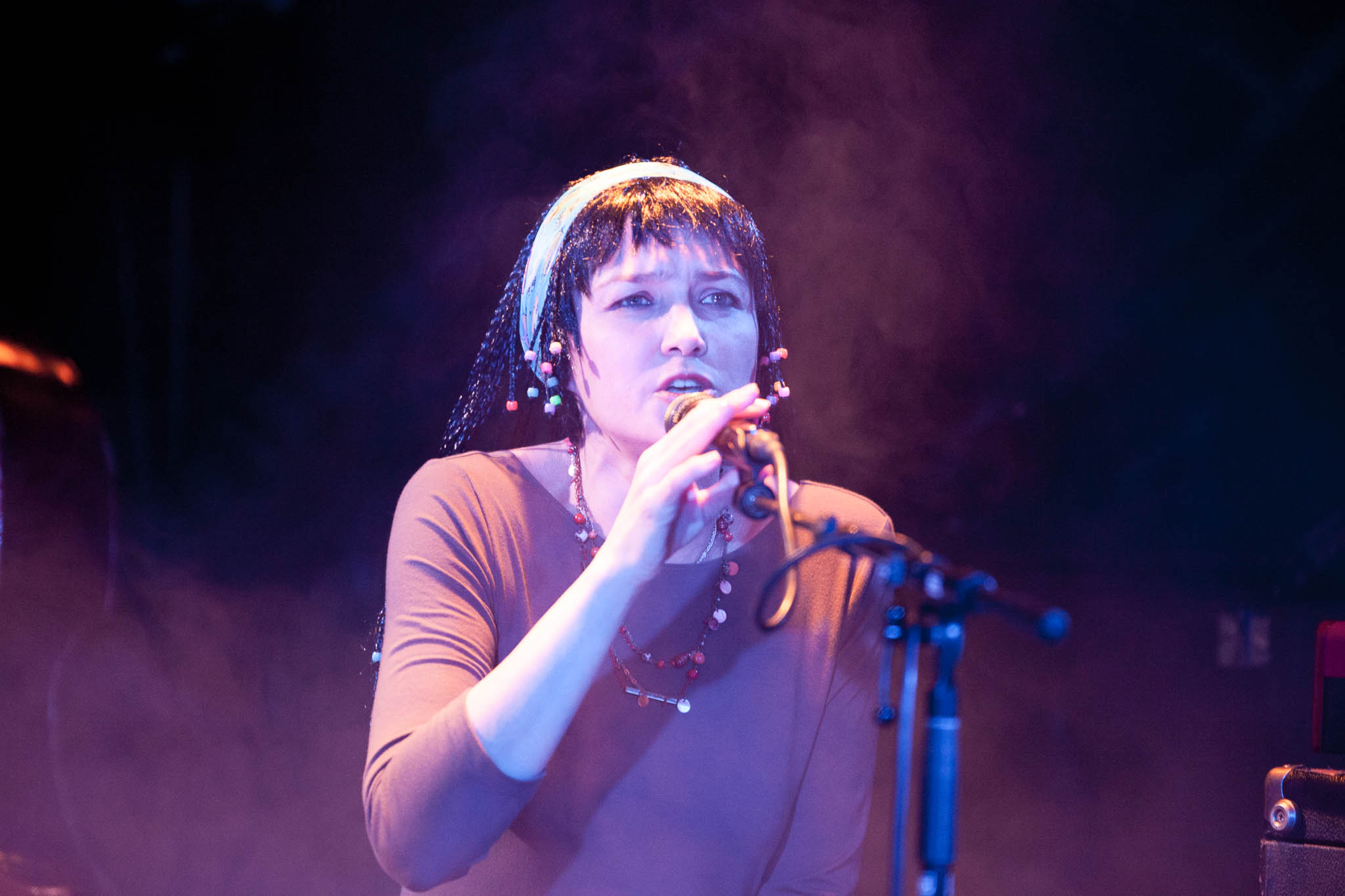
- Inna Zhelannaya at Bodø Jazz Open 2014

Background information
- Born: February 20, 1965; Moscow, Russian SFSR, Soviet Union
- Genres: Psychedelic folk, World music, Ethnic electronica
- Occupations: Singer-songwriter, musician
- Instrument: Vocals
- Years active: 1985–present
- Labels: GreenWave Records, Jaro Medien
- Member of: Farlanders, Alliance
- Website: Wikipedia:BLACKLIST/

Inna Yurievna Zhelannaya (Russian: Инна Юрьевна Желанная, February 20, 1965, Moscow) is a Russian singer-songwriter, best known as a frontwoman of the folk band Farlanders (1994-2004).

== Biography ==
Inna Zhelannaya was born in Moscow and spent her childhood years in Zelenograd, where she studied at a musical school and sang in a choir led by her mother, Alla Yosifovna. After the graduation she joined the musical college in Elista, Kalmykia, then returned to Moscow to continue her education. As a student, she got interested in rock music and started writing her own songs.

=== Career ===
In 1985, Zhelannaya formed her first band, Focus, with Eduard Vokhmyanin. Two years later she became the leader of her own group, M-Depo. In 1989, Zhelannaya joined the well-known Moscow band Alliance and started collaborating with author and multi-instrumentalist Sergey Starostin, who introduced her to the Russian musical folklore and soon also joined the band.

Alliance's album Sdelano v Belom (Made in White) was released in 1991 and won the Radio France International's Best East-European album award two years later. In 1994 the band travelled to France to take part in the concert for the Radio, but without the singer, as Inna Zhelannaya had left in 1992 to give birth to her child.

In 1994 she re-emerged with her own band, Farlanders, joined by ex-Alliance members Sergey Kalachyov (bass), Sergey Klevensky (clarinet) and Sergey Starostin. In 1995 they released the album Vodorosl (Seeweed). The song Tolko s Toboy (With You Only) was included in the Putumayo World Music compilation (featuring also Peter Gabriel, Gipsy Kings, Bob Marley, Johnny Clegg among others) which led to Farlanders’ traveling to the USA when they toured the East Coast, starting in Washington DC. The tour's high point was the band’s performance at the 1996 Summer Olympics' opening ceremony.

Inozemets (Foreigner, 1998) CD, recorded in the Netherlands and released by Moscow GreenWave Records, came out in the USA under the title Inna and the Farlanders. Later that year the band played at the WOMEX (Worldwide Music Expo) forum in Stockholm. Live album Moments, recorded in Bremen, Germany, came out in 2000 on GreenWave.

In 2001 the German Jaro Medien record label released Winter in Moscow CD, recorded in the early 1990s by Zhelannaya, Starostin and Norvegian singer Mari Boine. It was followed by Tantsy Teney (Shadows' Dances, 2001), an acoustic set of songs written by Sergey Kalachyov based on Inna's lyrics. Another studio album Vymysly (Fairytales) featuring Russian folk songs came out in January 2004 on GreenWave. Farlanders' jubilee 2004 concert celebrating the band's 10 years career (it was released on DVD in 2006, as Инна Жаланная и Farlanders) proved to be their last: the band broke up to reunite just once, on April 2, 2005, to perform at the Goldenmask theater festival, with Trey Gunn, whom Inna played with in 2004.

Gunn also played on three songs of Inna Zhelannaya's Kokon (The Cocoon, 2008) CD. Before that in 2006 the singer joined the band Malerия to record the album 77RUS which came out in June of that year.

In 2013, Inna Zhelannaya started working with a new band featuring Sergey 'Grebstel' Kalachov (bass), Oleg Maryakhin (saxophone, electronics), Dmitry Frolov (drums) and Vladimir Goubatov (sound engineer, referred to as a band member), her new songs combining elements of folk, progressive rock, jazz, trance, electronic, and psychedelia. Zhelannaya's double album Izvorot (The Bending) came out in October 2014, to some critical acclaim. "It's as if King Crimson would have approached the traditional musical folklore rooted out of the deepest Russian backwood," a Russian Rolling Stone reviewer opined.

On 18 May 2017 Zhelannaya and Kalachov (now, drums and arrangements) presented their new art and music project called VILY (ВИЛЫ, Fairies, see Vila (fairy)), featuring three more modern folk female singers, Margarita Kozheurova, Svetlana Lobanova and Alyona Lifshits.

== Discography ==
=== Inna Zhelannaya ===
- Sdelano v belom (1992, BSA Records) - as a part of "Alliance"
- Vodorosl (1995, General Records)
- Zima (live, 2008, Inasound Records. Recorded on June 3, 2007 in Moscow Art Theater)
- Kokon (2009, Inasound Records)
- Izvorot (2014, Inasound Records)

=== Inna Zhelannay and Farlanders ===
- Inozemets (1998, Green Wave Records)
- Moments (live, 2000, Green Wave. Recorded in Germany)
- Vymysly (2004, Green Wave)

=== Collaborations ===
- Winter in Moscow (2001, Jaro Medien GmbH), with Sergey Staroston and Mari Boine
- Tansy Teney (2002, Green Wave), with Sergey Kalatchyov
- 77RUS (2006, Никитин Records), with Malerия
