= Mikhail Alperin =

Soviet-Norwegian jazz pianist (1956–2018)

Misha Alperin
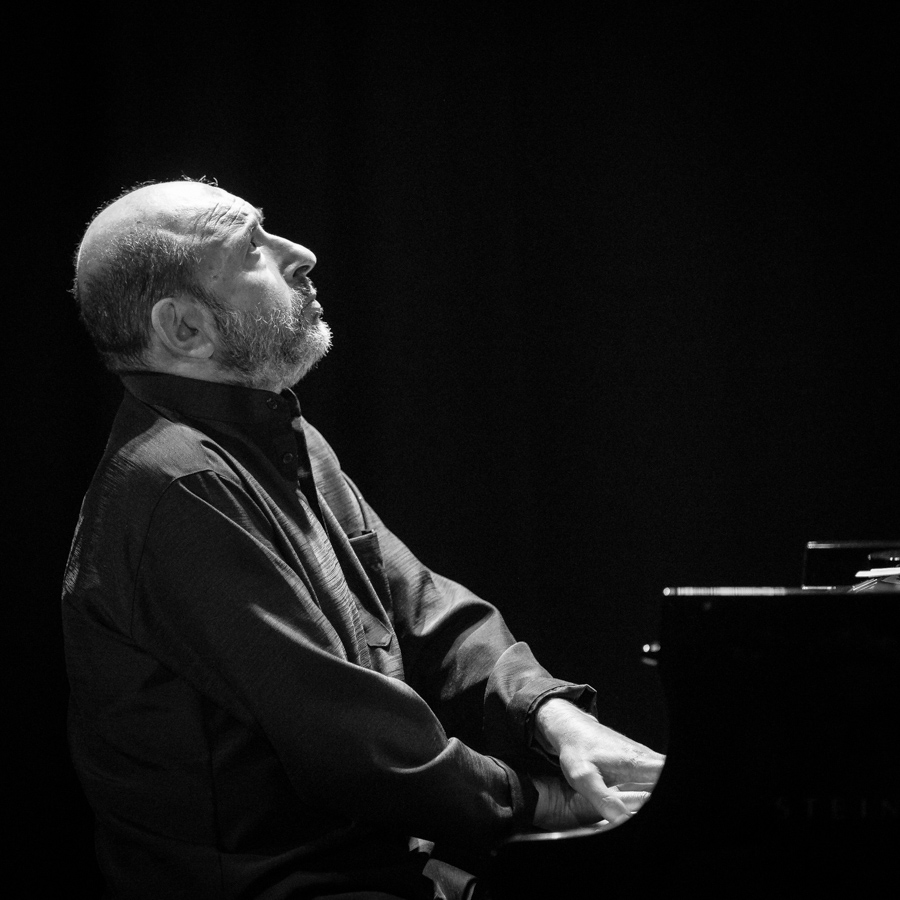
- Mikhail Alperin at Sentralen, Oslo Jazzfestival 2017.

Background information
- Also known as: Misha Alperin
- Born: Michail Jefimowitsch Alperin; 7 November 1956; Kamianets-Podilskyi, Ukrainian SSR, Soviet Union
- Died: 11 May 2018 (aged 61) Oslo, Norway
- Genres: Jazz
- Occupations: Musician, composer
- Instrument: Piano
- Website: www.alperin.no

Michail Jefimowitsch Alperin (Ukrainian: Миха́йло Юхи́мович Альпе́рін; 7 November 1956 – 11 May 2018), usually credited as Misha Alperin, was a Soviet-Norwegian jazz pianist, known as a key member of the Moscow Art Trio.

== Biography ==
Alperin was born in Kamianets-Podilskyi, Ukrainian SSR to a Jewish family. He was educated in Khmelnytskyi, Bălți and Chișinău. In 1980, he formed one of the first jazz ensembles in Moldavian SSR. He moved to Moscow in the 1980s and founded the Moscow Art Trio with Arkady Shilkloper and folk singer Sergey Nikolaevich Starostin. He has also worked with Huun Huur Tu. From 1993 to 2018 he lived in Oslo, Norway; he was professor of music at the Norwegian Academy of Music and he supervised pianist Helge Lien and Morten Qvenild among others. He released several works on ECM Records. Alperin died on 11 May 2018 at the age of 61.

== Discography ==
An asterisk (*) indicates that the year is that of release.

Year recorded	Title	Label	Personnel/Notes
1989	Wave of Sorrow	ECM	Duo, co-led with Arkady Shilkloper (French horn, jagdhorn, fluegelhorn, vocals)
1992	Folk Dreams	Jaro Medien	
1993	The Blue Fjords	RDM	Solo piano; reissued as Blue Fjord by Jaro Medien
1996*	Hamburg Concert	Jaro Medien Moscow Art Trio	
1996*	Prayer	Jaro Medien Moscow Art Trio	
1997	First Impression	ECM	With John Surman (soprano sax, baritone sax), Arkady Shilkloper (French horn, flugelhorn), Terje Gewelt (bass), Jon Christensen (drums), Hans-Kristian Kjos Sørensen (percussion)
1998	North Story	ECM	Quintet, with Arkady Shilkloper (French horn, fluegelhorn), Tore Brunborg (tenor sax), Terje Gewelt (bass), Jon Christensen (drums)
1998	At Home	ECM	Solo piano
1998	Night	ECM	Trio, with Anja Lechner (cello), Hans-Kristian Kjos Sørensen (percussion, marimba, vocals); in concert
2000*	Overture/Etude	Boheme	
2000*	Piano	Boheme	In concert
2000*	Portrait	Jaro Medien	
2006	Her First Dance	ECM	Trio, with Arkady Shilkloper (French horn, fluegelhorn), Anja Lechner (cello)

2008 — Moscow Art Trio & Norwegian Chamber Orchestra «Village Variations» (JARO 4290-2) Germany

2009 — Moscow Art Trio «Live in Holland» (CDDOMA 091102) Russia; (JARO 4302-2) Germany

2010 — The Bulgarian Voices Angelite with Huun-Huur-Tu & Moscow Art Trio «Legend» (JARO 4300-2) Germany

== See also ==
- List of jazz pianists
