= Johannes Cernota =

German pianist, composer and artist

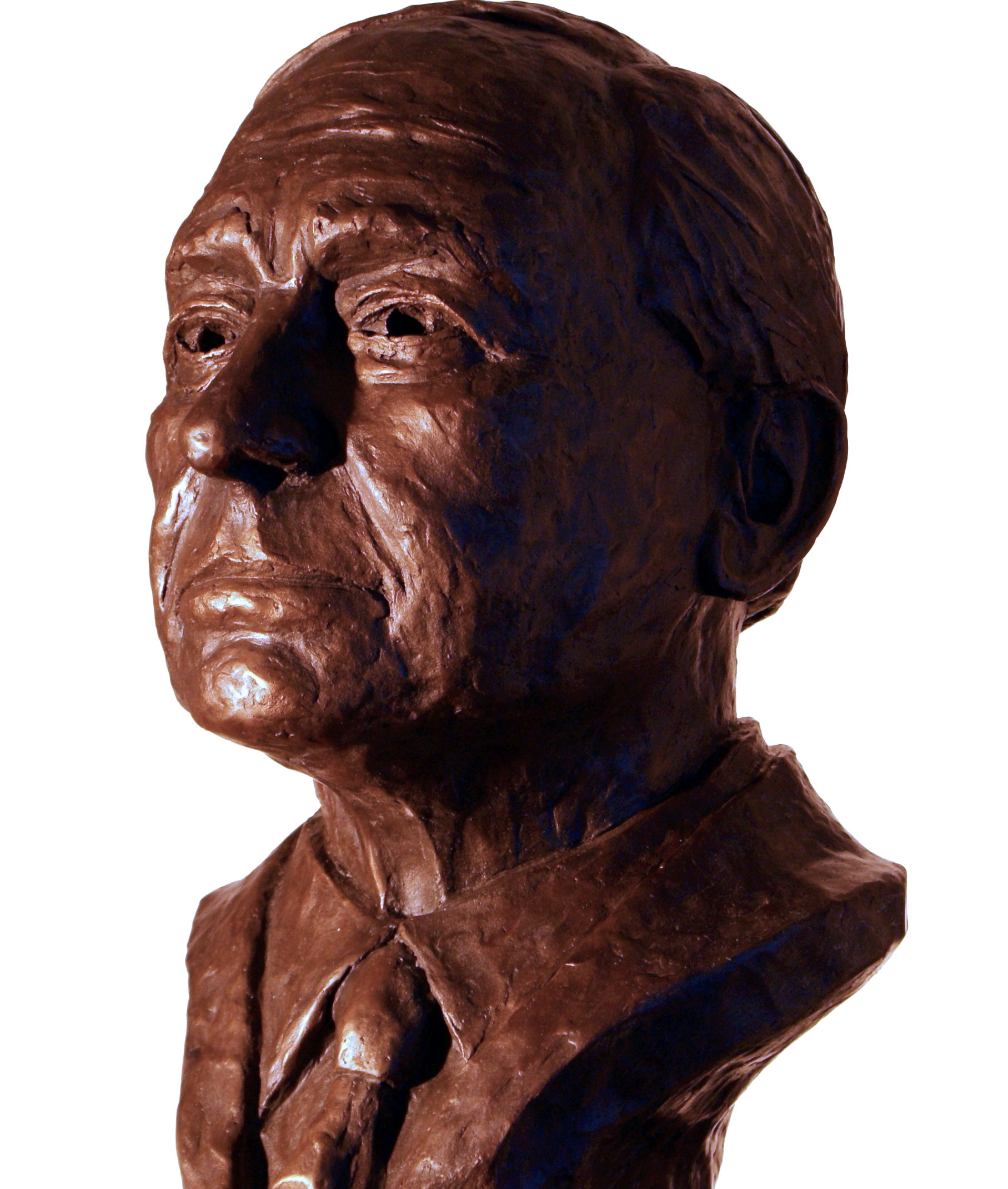
Bust of the publisher Peter Suhrkamp, designed by Johannes Cernota 2012

Johannes Cernota (born 16 March 1955) is a German pianist, composer and artist.

== Life ==
Born in Visbek, Lower Saxony, Cernota received his first piano lessons at the age of five and studied at the Musikhochschule Köln and at the Hochschule für Künste Bremen from 1974 to 1982 with Luciano Ortis, Kurt Seibert and Günter Ludwig, among others. From 1980 to 1995, he held several teaching posts for piano at the universities of Bremen and Oldenburg. From 1982 to 1983, he was also répétiteur at the Goethe Theatre in Bremen.

Cernota has released several recordings as a composer and concert pianist and has played in several radio and television recordings. He is also active as a visual artist with performances, sound art, painting and sculptures. His recordings of works by Erik Satie and, together with the cellist Thomas Beckmann, of works by Charlie Chaplin are well known. The corresponding CD entitled Oh! That Cello was awarded the "German Record Critics' Prize".

== Publications ==
- Air Sculpture. CD-Aufnahme einer Klanginstallation
- Oh! That Cello. Music by Charlie Chaplin. With Thomas Beckmann
- Erik Satie – Sport & Vergnügen. Hör- und Bilderbuch
- Sparta. Pieces by Erik Satie, Chick Corea, Arvo Pärt and Johannes Cernota
- Johannes Cernota plays Erik Satie.
- Erik Satie / Johannes Cernota – Gnossiennes, Gymnopédies, Pièces Froides U.A. LP, Germany 1984.
