= Trigon (Moldovan band) =

- Origin: Chişinău, Moldova
- Genres: Folk-jazz; Ethno jazz World fusion
- Years active: 1992–present
- Members: Anatol Ştefăneţ; Dan Bruma; Vali Boghean; Garry Tverdohleb
- Past members: Sergiu Testemiţeanu; Oleg Baltaga; Alexandru Murzac; Mario Caldararu; Enver Izmailov; Alexandru Arcus; Dorel Burlacu
- Website: http://www.trigonjazz.com/

Trigon is a folk-jazz band from Moldova, described as "Moldova's leading jazz ensemble".

Trigon was founded in 1992 by Anatol Ştefăneţ, "a leading figure in Moldovan jazz in the early twenty-first century", as a trio of Ştefăneţ (viola), Sergiu Testemiţeanu (bass guitar) and Oleg Batalga (percussion). The band developed "a form of 'ethno-jazz' blending traditional tunes with modern improvisation". Another description of its style is "heavy punk meets rock with folk thrown in".

Trigon's first CD, The Moldovan Wedding in Jazz, described as "a milestone in so-called world music", was released in 1993. Later CDs Opt-–i–mistic, Seven Steps and Autumn Visit featured the Bulgarian kaval flute.
