= Arkady Shilkloper =

Russian musician and composer (born 1956)

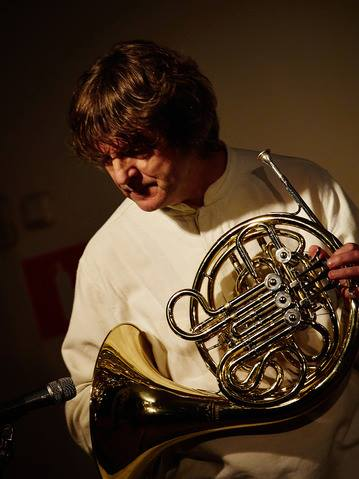
- Shilkloper in 2015

Background information
- Born: 17 October 1956 (age 69); Moscow, RSFSR, USSR
- Genres: Jazz, classical, world, free improvisation, avant-garde
- Occupations: Musician, composer
- Instruments: horn, alphorn, flugelhorn, etc.
- Years active: 1962–present
- Labels: ECM, JARO, Neuklang, Leo, ACT, ArtBeat Music

Arkady Shilkloper (Russian: Аркадий Фимович Шилклопер; born 17 October 1956) is a Russian multi-instrumentalist (horn, alphorn, flugelhorn, corno da caccia, didgeridoo, shofar, and others) and composer, currently living in Berlin. He is known as one of the best jazz performers on horn and alphorn.

== Biography ==
Shilkloper was born in Moscow and started playing the alto horn at the age of six and switched to horn in 1967. At the age of eleven he entered the Moscow Military Music School. After two years of military service (1974–76), he studied at the Moscow Gnessin Institute (Gnessin Russian Academy of Music; 1976–81). At the same time he began his career in the orchestra of the Bolshoi Theatre (1978–85) and also began his first jazz activities.

In 1984, he formed a duo with his colleague from the Bolshoi Theatre, bassist Mikhail Karetnikow, with whom he recorded the LP "Move". (Melodiya, С60 26043 003). From 1985 to 1989, he played with A. Kirichenko and S. Letov in the band Tri-O (LP "Three Holes"). During te same period, he was a member of the Moscow Philharmonic Orchestra.

Since 1986, he has collaborated with pianist Mikhail Alperin. Their first album, Wave of Sorrow (1990), was the first Russian album on ECM. Later, Shilkloper participated in three more Alperin recordings for ECM: North Story (1997), First Impression (1999) and Her First Dance (2008).

In 1990, the Alperin-Shilkloper duo invited Sergey Starostin, a Moscow Conservatory-educated clarinetist and a researcher of Russian authentic folk music, which results in the creation of Moscow Art Trio. The trio tours regularly, though its members now live in three different countries. They were one of the most well-known Ethno Jazz groups from Russia. In Russia, their albums were released by Boheme Music, and in Europe by Jaro.

In 1990, Shilkloper visited US for the first time. According to Leonard Feather from the Los Angeles Times, "the Soviet horn virtuoso was one of four Jazzmen from the Soviet Union who arrived here last week to take part in the 23rd annual University of Idaho Jazz Festival at his home town's namesake city. Shilkloper, 33, on his first visit to the United States was the artistic sensation of the four-day event."

Since 1995, Arkady Shilkloper has played in Pago Libre with Austrian violinist Tscho Theissing, Swiss pianist John Wolf Brennan and Austrian bassist Georg Breinschmid, Since January 2012, there has beenanother member,Tom Götze from Dresden, on double bass.

Since 1998, Shilkloper has played the alphorn. His "Pilatus", "Presente Para Moscou" and "Zum Gipfel und zurück" albums feature a lot of his alphorn playing. In 1998–2002, Shilkloper performed with Europe's leading big band, the Vienna Art Orchestra. In 2000, he put together the Mauve Trio with Alegre Corrêa (guitar) and Georg Breinschmid (double bass). Their debut album Mauve (Quinton Records, 2002) was awarded the prestigious Hans Koller Prize in Austria as the "CD of the Year".

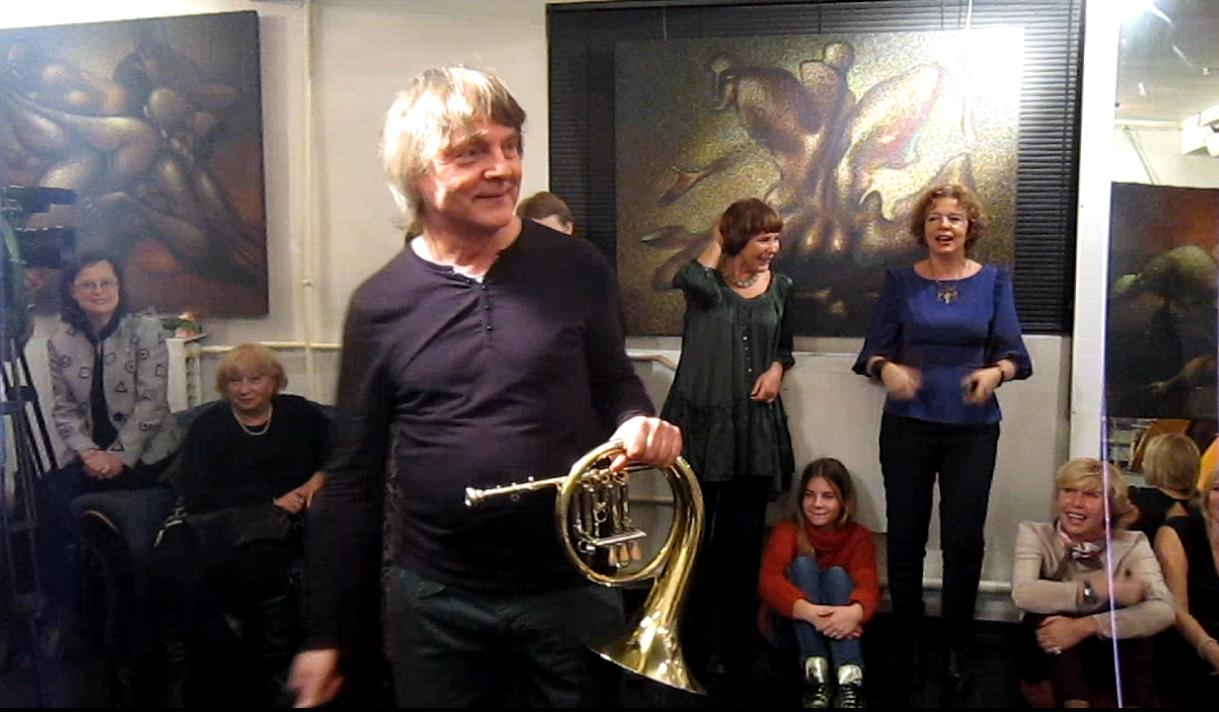
Shilkloper in 2015

In 2004, he gave the first performance of the Concerto for Alphorn and Orchestra by Daniel Schnyder, a work commissioned by the Menuhin Festival in Gstaad. In 2012, he started a collaboration with overtone singer Christian Zehnder and John Wolf Brennan.

In 2015, Jazzahead presented his duet with the young Ukrainian jazz pianist Vadim Neselovskyi.

In 2019, the Advisory Council of the International Horn Society, in recognition of significant contribution to the science and art of the horn, designated Arkady Shilkloper as an Honorary Member of the International Horn Society.

Shilkloper has mastered extended techniques for both the horn and the alphorn. According to Leonard Feather, his control of the horn and his creativity have set a new standard.

== Discography ==
=== Solo albums ===
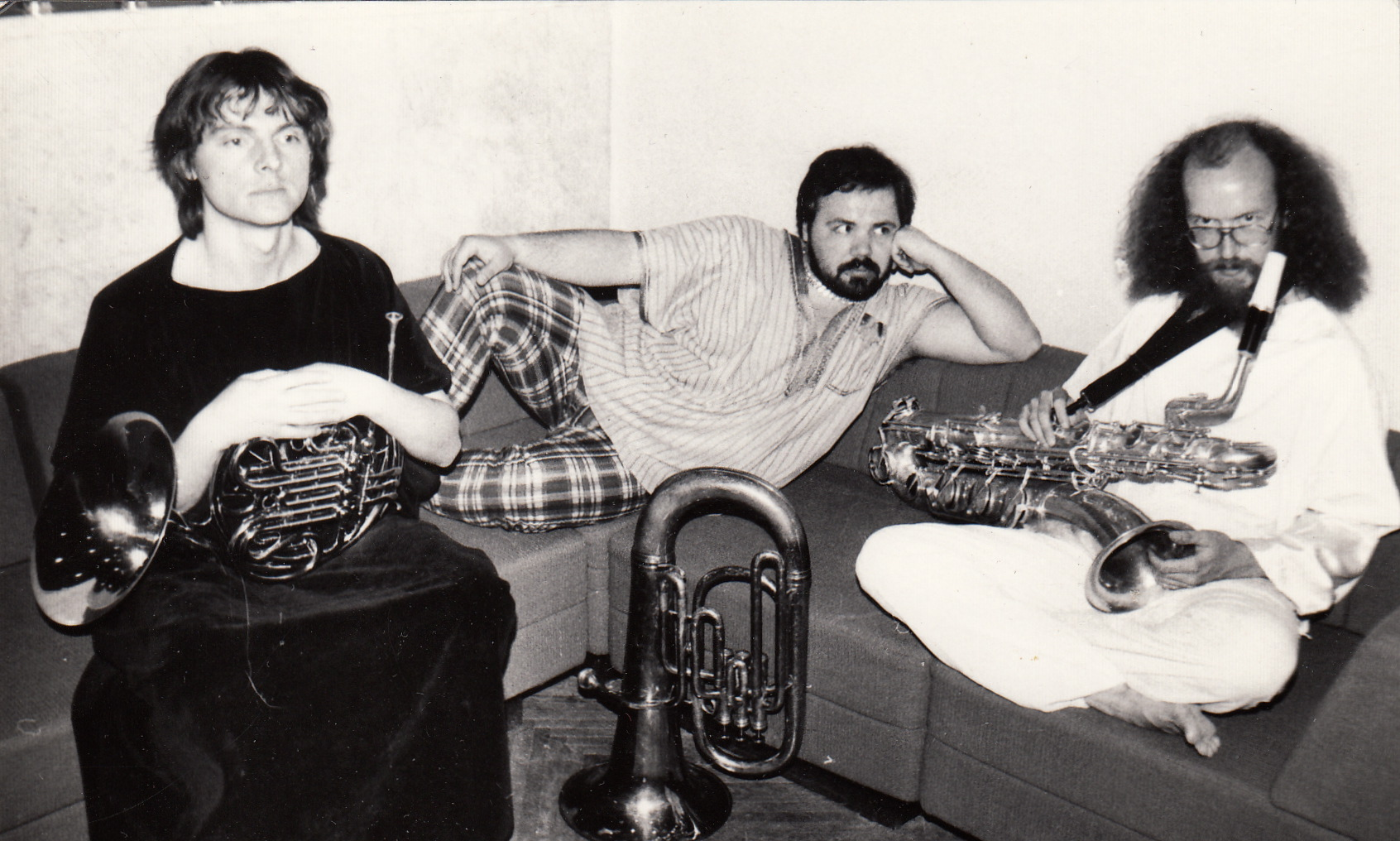
TriO

- 1996 – "Hornology" (RDM 6 06 144, Boheme Music CDBMR 809016) Russia
- 2000 – "Pilatus" (Boheme Music CDBMR 906063) Russia
- 2003 – "Presente para Moscou" (Dom Records); reissued in 2005 (JARO 4264–2) Germany
- 2006 – "Zum Gipfel und zuruck. Neue Alphornmusik" (MIGROS/Musiques suisses MGB CD 6246) Switzerland
- 2008 – "Portrait" Russia
- 2010 – "Live in DOM" (Dom Records) Russia
- 2015 – "Owner of a Lonely Horn" Symphonic Tribute to YES (ArtBeat Music) Russia
- 2024 – "New Hornology" (Jazzist JZT) Russia
- 2025 – «Night In Gale» Arkady Shilkloper / John Wolf Brennan (Leo CD LR 944) England
- 2025 – «Whale Songs» Arkady Shilkloper & BGF Big Band (Jazzist JZT) Russia

==== With Misha Alperin ====
- 1990 — Alperin / Shilkloper «Wave of Sorrow» (ECM 1990) Germany
- 1993 — Alperin / Shilkloper «Live in Grenoble» (RDM 3 05 015), 1998 (Boheme Music CDBMR 809006) Russia
- 1997 — Mikhail Alperin «North Story» (ECM 1596) Germany
- 1999 — Mikhail Alperin «First Impression» (ECM 1664) Germany
- 2008 — Misha Alperin «Her First Dance» (ECM 1995) Germany

==== With Vadim Neselovskyi ====
- 2013 — Arkady Shilkloper / Vadim Neselovskyi «Last Snow» (ArtBeat Music AB-CD-06-2013-052) Russia
- 2015 — Arkady Shilkloper / Vadim Neselovskyi «Krai» (Neuklang NCD4109) Germany
- 2017 — Arkady Shilkloper / Vadim Neselovskyi «Lustrum» (Neuklang NCD4147) Germany

==== With Moscow Art Trio ====
- 1993 — Moscow Art Trio «Prayer» (RDM 3 01 006 и Boheme Music CDBMR 809009) Russia; (Silex Y225039) France; (JARO 4193–2) Germany
- 1995 — Mikhail Alperin «Folk Dreams» (JARO 4187–2) Germany
- 1996 — Moscow Art Trio «Hamburg Concert» (JARO 4201–2) Germany
- 1998 — Moscow Art Trio «Music» (JARO 4214–2) Germany
- 1998 — Moscow Art Trio «Live In Karlsruhe» (Boheme Music CDBMR 809010) Russia
- 1998 — The Bulgarian Voices «Angelite» & Moscow Art Trio with Huun-Huur-Tu «Mountain Tale» (JARO 4212–2) Germany
- 2001 — Moscow Art Trio «Once Upon a Time» (JARO 4238–2) Germany
- 2006 — Moscow Art Trio «Instead of Making Children» (JARO 4274–2) Germany
- 2008 — Moscow Art Trio & Norwegian Chamber Orchestra «Village Variations» (JARO 4290–2) Germany
- 2009 — Moscow Art Trio «Live in Holland» (CDDOMA 091102) Russia; (JARO 4302–2) Germany
- 2010 — The Bulgarian Voices Angelite with Huun-Huur-Tu & Moscow Art Trio «Legend» (JARO 4300–2) Germany

==== With Pago Libre ====
- 1996 — Pago Libre «Pago Libre» (Bellaphon L+R 45105) Germany. 2002, (Leo CD LR 354) England
- 1999 — Pago Libre «Wake Up Call» Live in Italy (Leo CD LR 272) England
- 2001 — Pago Libre Cinemagique/Fifteen Soundtracks For An Imaginary Cinema" (TCB-The Montreux Label 01112) Switzerland
- 2003 — Pago Libre «Phoenix/Live in Salzburg & Zurich» (Leo CD LR 377) England
- 2005 — Pago Libre «Stepping Out» (Leo CD LR 444) England
- 2008 — Pago Libre Sextett «PlatzDADA» (Christoph Merian Verlag) Switzerland
- 2009 — Pago Libre «Fake Folk» (Zappel Music ZM 0017) Austria
- 2018 — Pago Libre & Friends «got hard» (Leo CD LR 835) England
- 2019 — Pago Libre «Cinémagique 2.0» (Leo Cd LR 863) England
- 2020 — Pago Libre «Mountain Songlines» (Leo CD LR 886) England
- 2020 — Pago Libre Sextett «PlatzDADA» (Leo CD LR 887) England
- 2021 — Pago Libre & Sooon «FriendShip» (Leo CD LR 919) England
- 2024 — Pago Libre & Sooon «FriendShip - Riffs ahead!» (Leo CD LR 942) England
- 2025 — Pago Libre «Wild Card» (Leo CD) England

=== Other projects ===
- 1986 — Arkady Shilkloper / Mikhail Karetnikov «Move» (Melodia С60 26043 003, LP) Russia
- 1988 — Rhapsody in Russia A Gershwin Celebration (Sheffeld Lab CD-28) USA
- 1989 — Три-О «Three Holes» (Melodia С60-28461) Russia
- 1994 — Moscow Composers Orchestra «Kings and Cabbages» (Leo Lab 005) England
- 1994 — Kim Kristensen & Ildvaeverne (Storyville STCD 4193) Denmark
- 1994 — Christian Muthspiel «Octet Ost II» (Amadeo 521 823) Austria
- 1995 — Три-О «Trialogue» (SoLyd SLR 0031) Russia
- 1996 — Arkady Shilkloper Acoustic Quartet «BRASS COMPLOT» (Ermatel Records JCD 020) and 1998 (Boheme Music CDBMR 809008) Russia
- 1996 — Karl Berger Orchestra «No Man Is An Island» (Douglas Music ADC4/Knitting Factory) USA
- 1996 — Baltic Art Orchestra LIVE AT JAZZ BALTIKA FESTIVAL 1994 SALZAU (Sonore Records SN021 CD)
- 1997 — Moscow Composers Orchestra "Let Peremsky Dream" (LEO LAB CD 035) England
- 1998 — Arkady Shilkloper/ Vladimir Volkov/ Sergey Starostin «XIX98» (Boheme Music CDBMR 810029) Russia
- 1998 — Volkovtrio & Arkady Shilkloper «Fragment» (SoLyd SLR 013) Russia
- 1998 — Volkovtrio «Much Better» (Green Wave Records) Russia
- 1998 — Arkady Shilkloper / Andrey Kondakov / Vladimir Volkov / Christian Scheuber «Live In Norway» (Boheme Music CDBMR 809007) Russia
- 1998 — Arkady Shilkloper & Acoustic Quartet «The Brass Complot» (Ermatell Records JCD 020 and Boheme Music CDBMR 809008) Russia
- 1998 — Moscow Composers Orchestra «Kharms – 10 – INCIDENTS» (CDLA 05019) Russia
- 1999 — «Rhapsody In Russia: A Gershwin Celebration» (Sheffield Lab CD-28) USA
- 1999 — Stefano Maltese Open Sound Ensemble «Living Alive» (Leo Records 265) England
- 1999 — Bendik Hofseth – Smilets Historie. "Jerusalem" (Sonet – SCD 15128) Norway
- 1999 — Andrei Razin & The Second Approach «Pierrot» (Boheme Music CDBMR 904056) Russia
- 2000 — Andreas Willers Octet «The Ground Music» (Enja ENJ-9368 2) Germany
- 2000 — Kondakov / Volkov / Shilkloper «Outline» (Boheme Music CDBMR 912119) and Leo Records CD LR 620 (2011) Russia and England
- 2001 — Yuri Goloubev «Toremar Island» (Landy Star) Russia
- 2001 — Shilkloper / Correa / Breinschmid «Mauve» (Quinton 0106–2) Austria
- 2002 — «Afrodynamix» (ATS-Records CD-0550) Austria
- 2004 — Er.J.Orchestra «The Unicorn» (44 records) Ukraine
- 2005 — VSP orkestra & Arkady Shilkloper CD LP (OCTA PROD label ref:ORK 002) France
- 2005 — TONS izabel padovani ronaldo saggiorato (GIL0505-1) Austria
- 2005 — Sensationelles Alphorn (Tell Music AG TM0510022) Switzerland
- 2006 — Vladimir Tarasov's Russian Orchestra, Live from Salzau at 10.06.1995 (Strange Sound Records SSR 06014)
- 2007 — Niels Klein Tentett "The Last Soup" (JHM 163) Germany
- 2008 — Vince Mendoza «BLAUKLANG» (ACT 9465–2) Germany
- 2009 — Geir Lysne Ensemble "The Grieg Code" (ACT 9479-2 LC 07644) Germany
- 2010 — Mussorgsky Dis-Covered (Preiser Records PR90785) Austria
- 2012 — Russian Folksongs In The Key Of New Jazz (участие, Leo CD LR 659) England
- 2013 — Zehnder / Brennan / Shilkloper «Dehei nöd dehei» Switzerland
- 2013 — AlphornExperience «Axxalp» Switzerland
- 2014 — Mario Piacentini Sextet «Neant» (Incipit Records) Italy
- 2015 — Rolf Listevand & Bjergsted Jazz Ensemble «Tourdion» (INNER EAR INE22) Norway
- 2015 — The Mallet-Horn Jazz Band (Klarthe Records) France
- 2017 — Yury Markin «On a Large Scale» (FANCYMUSIC, FANCY088) Russia
- 2019 — FizFuz «Lale - Colours of Eurasia»(Pianissimo Musik) Germany
- 2019 — Rastko Obradovic Quartet feat. Arkady Shilkloper «The Northern Experience» (AMP Music & Records – AT047) Norway
- 2020 — Lenny Sendersky & Moon Strings feat. Arkady Shilkloper (tracks 8,9 & 10) «Blues Mizrahi» (LOS 238–2) Norway
- 2020 — Evelina Petrova, Roberto Dani, Arkady Shilkloper «Beyond the Valley» Global Sonic Norway
- 2026 — Arkady Shilkloper, Michael T.Otto, Johannes Bär «Here's BoP» (Neuklang) Germany

== Filmography ==
- 1998 — «Moscow Art Trio Live in Poland» XXV International Pianist JAZZ Festival in Kalisz. Director: Rafal Sory.
- 1999 — «Moscow Art Trio», Movie director: Manfred Waffender, Duration: 01 h 00 min, Production: © NDR, Available version(s): DE
- 2004 — «Legend». Live in Belgrade. Moscow Art Trio, Bulgarian Voices "Angelite", Huun-Huur-To. Live Recording at Sava Center in May 2004
- 2007 — «Moscow Art Trio» and The Norvegian Chamber Orchestra
- 2012 — VSP orkestra»."VSP orkestra concert", concert entirely recorded at the jazz festival "la Petite Pierre" (France) on August 11, 2011, with Arkady Shilkloper alphorn & French horn soloist, with Renaud Leipp alphorn,Ghislain Muller vibraphone and composer, Pascal Beck big band director, DVD, © octa prod / France, ref : octaprod001
- 2013 — "Inspiration and Improvisation". Arkady Shilkloper talks to Sarah Willis on a Horn Hangout live from Berlin about his amazing career, improvising on the horn and on the alpine horn and even makes Sarah sweat a bit ... September 2013
- 2013 — «Das Alphorn und die Sonne im Gepäck. Arkady Shilkloper auf dem Weg zur JazzBaltica». Dokumentarfilm, Deutschland, 2013, 58:33 Min., Buch und Regie: Christoph Engel, Produktion: ZDF, 3sat, Erstsendung: 28. September 2013 bei 3sat.

== Gallery ==
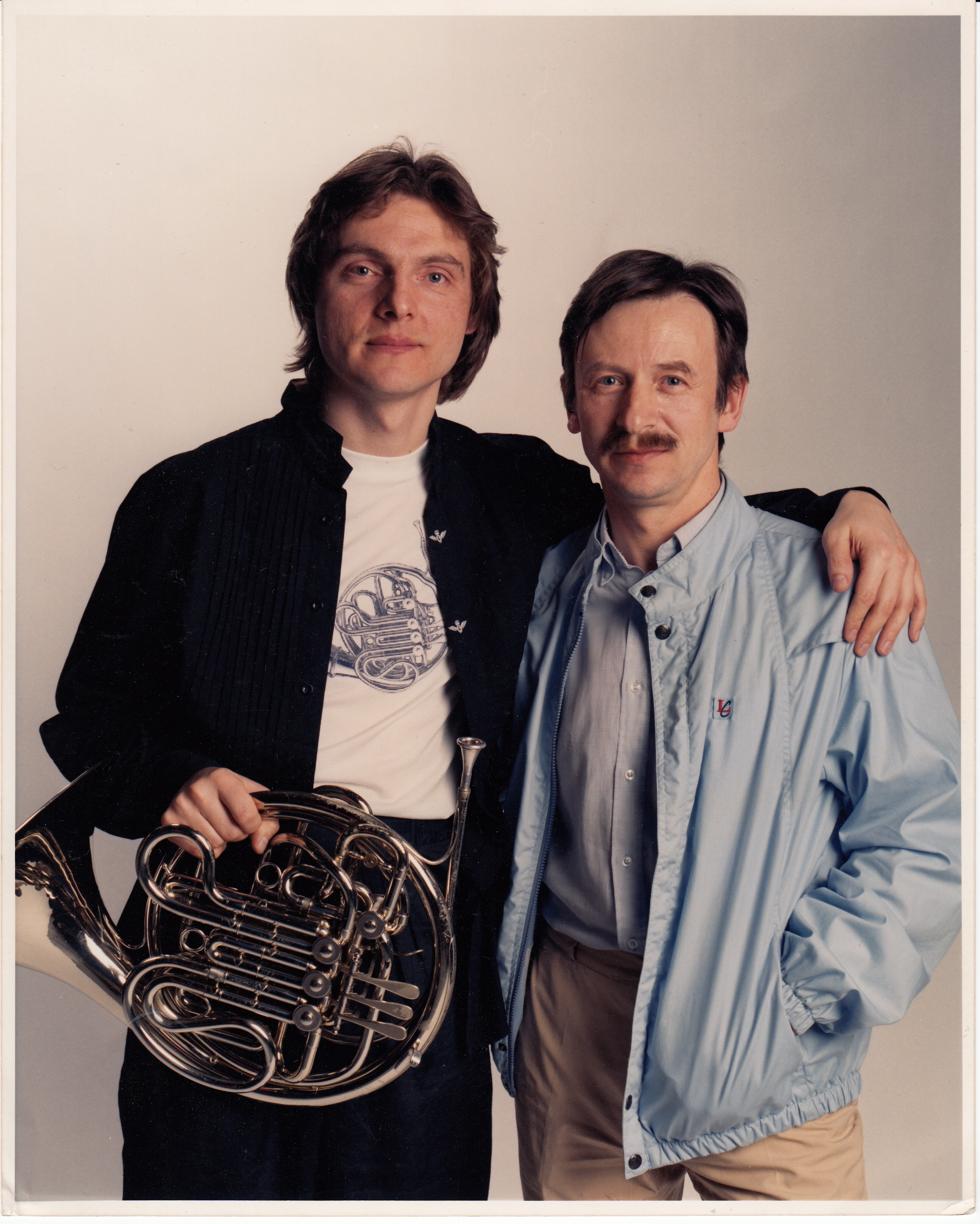
With Mikhail Karetnikov, 2013

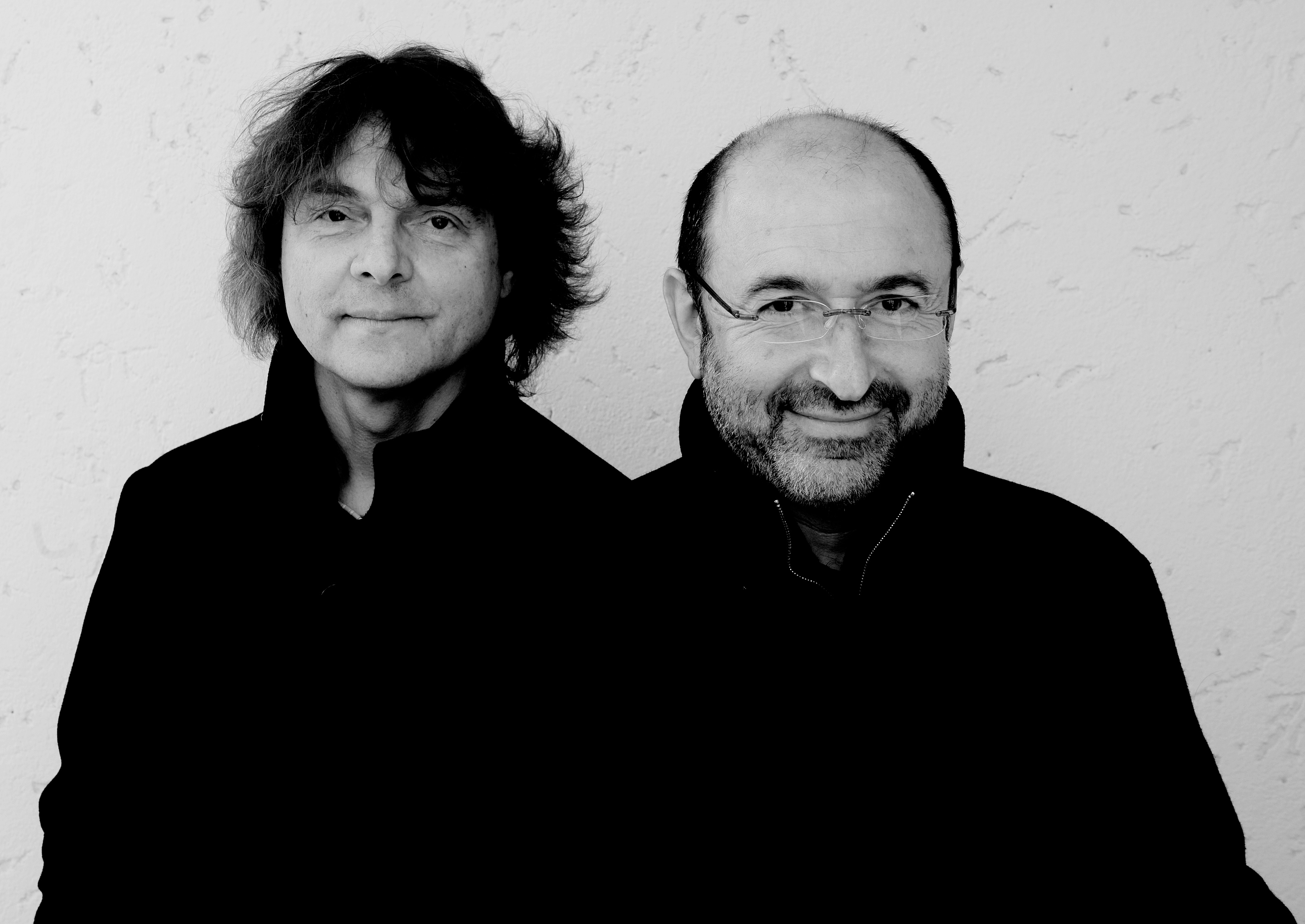
Shilkloper and Alperin, 2008

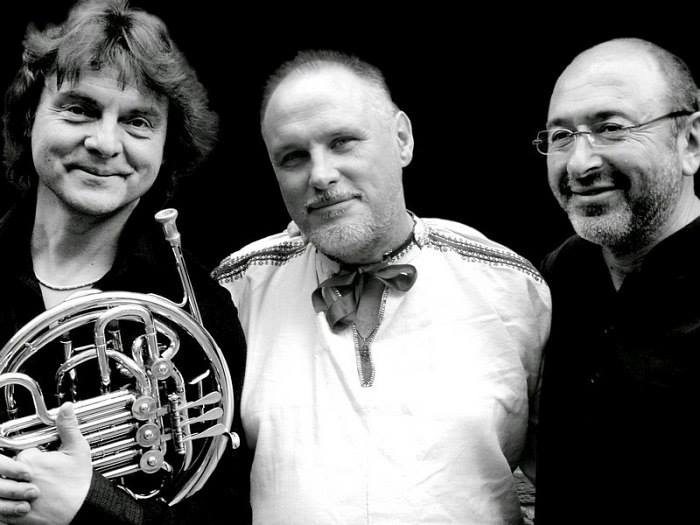
Moscow Art Trio, 2001

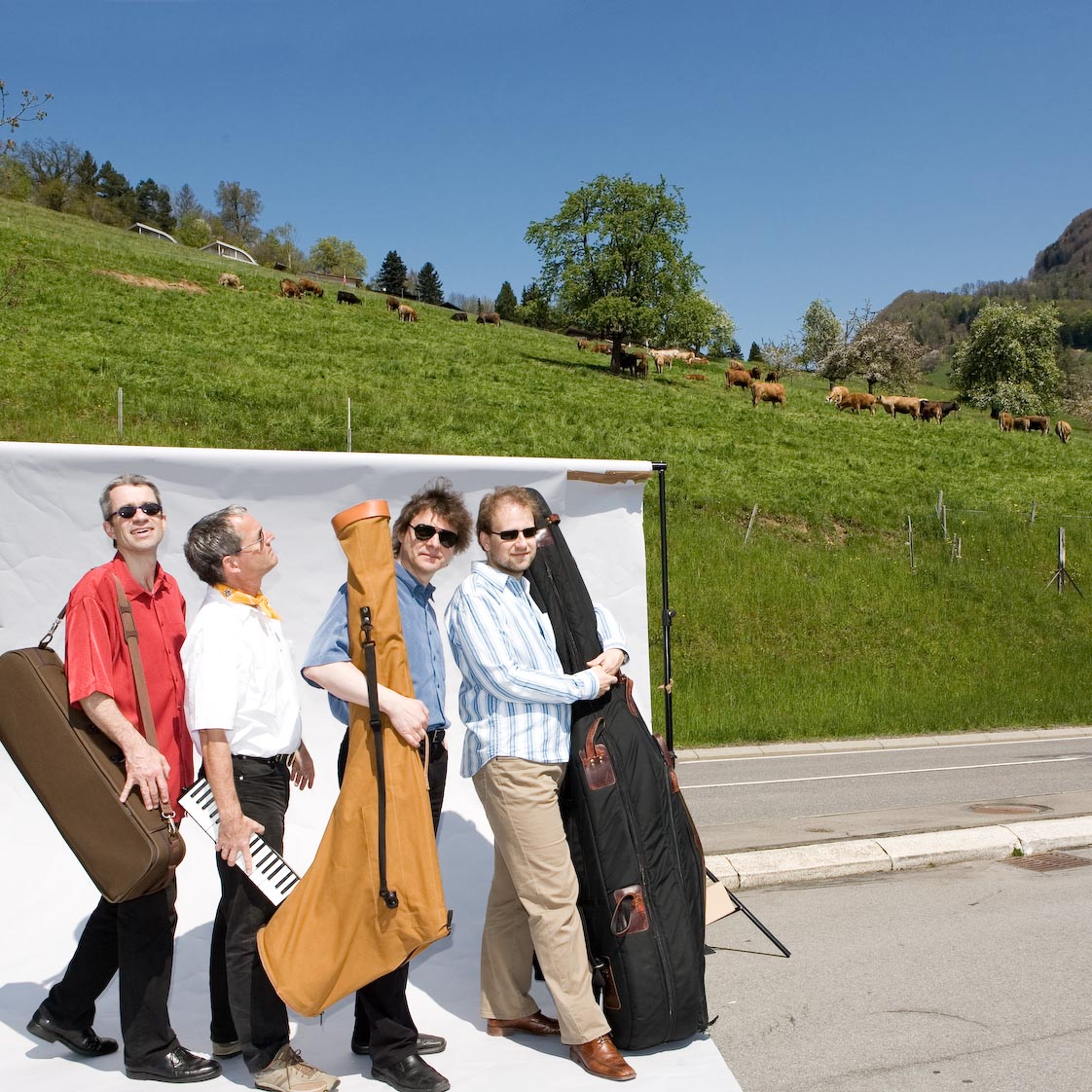
Pago Libre, 2008

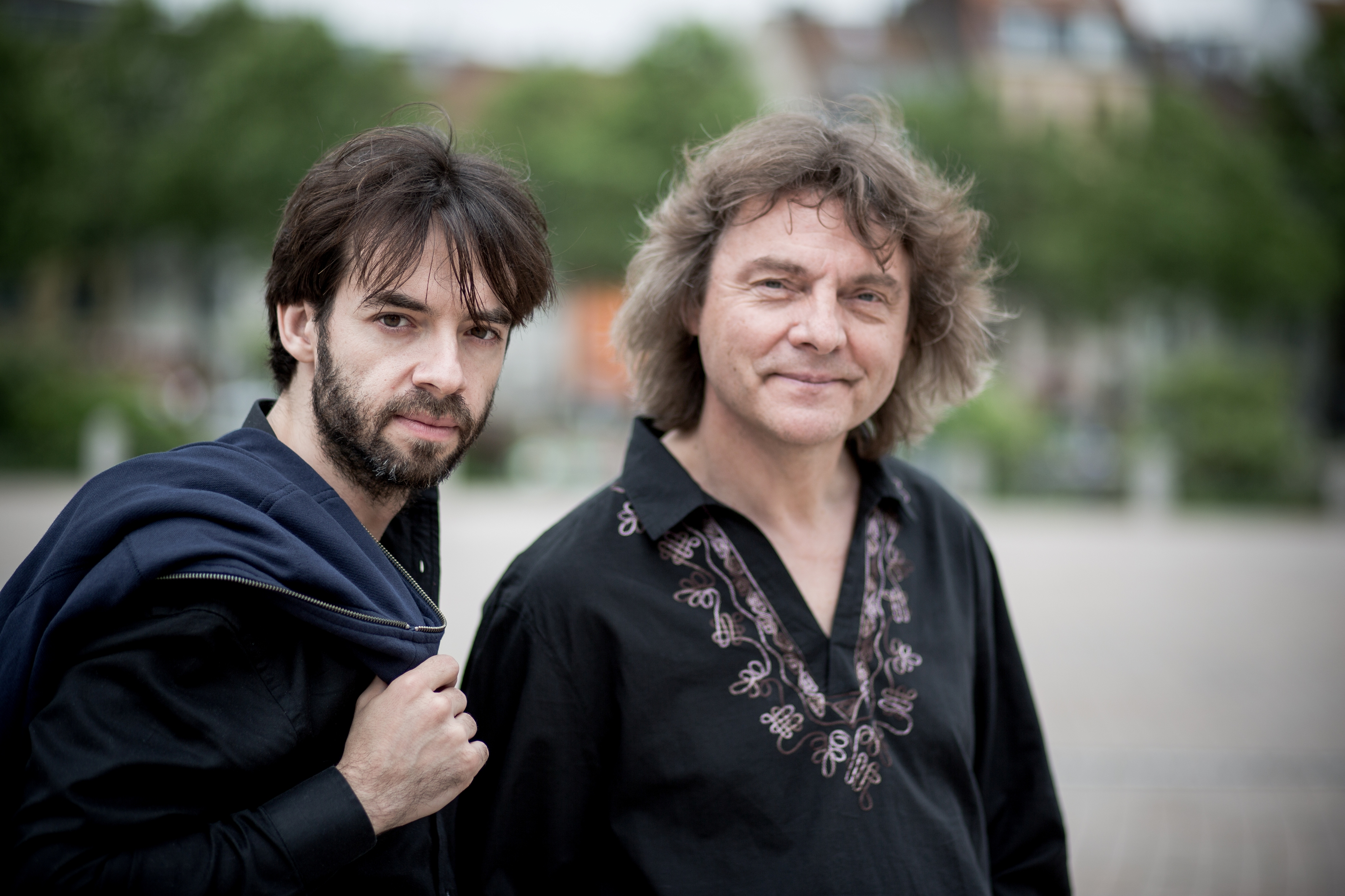
With Vadim Neselovsky, 2016

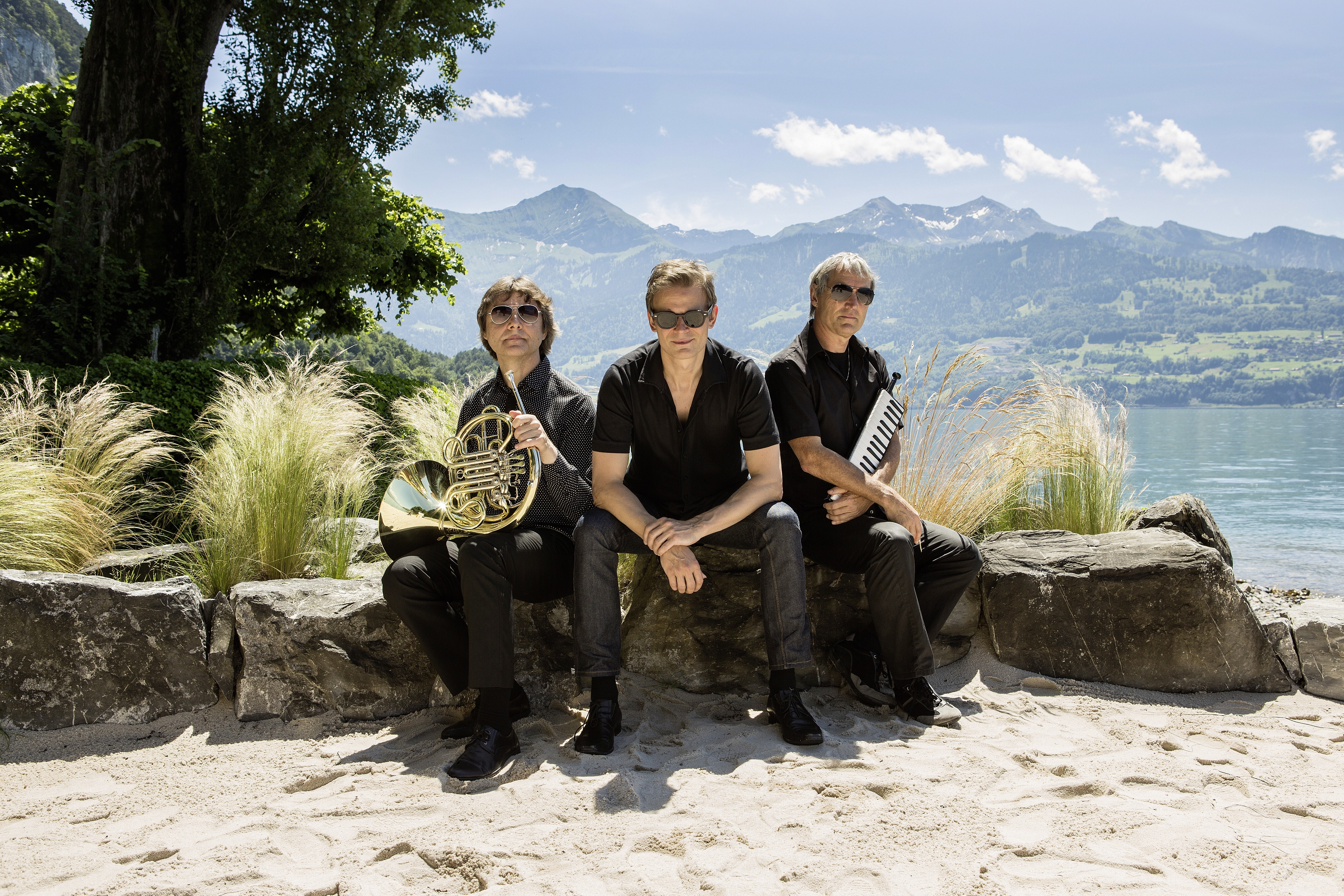
Trio Zehnder, 2014

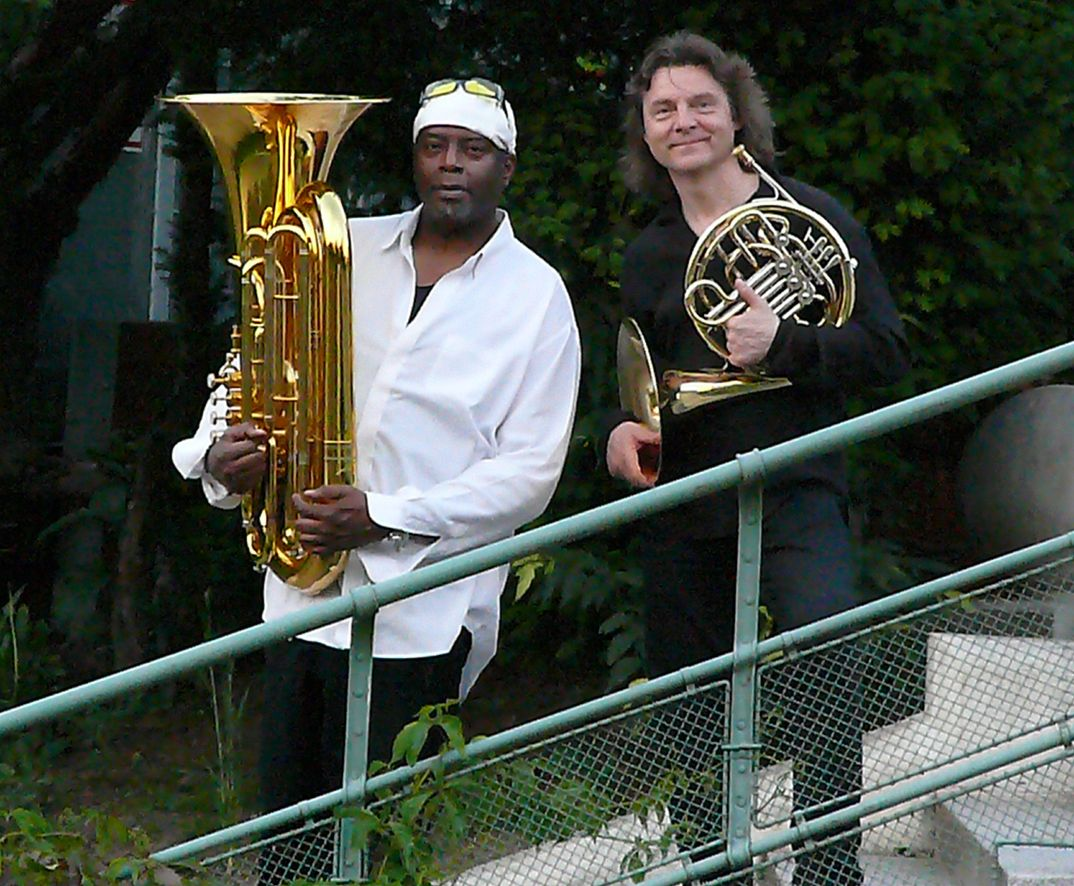
With Jon Sass, 2016

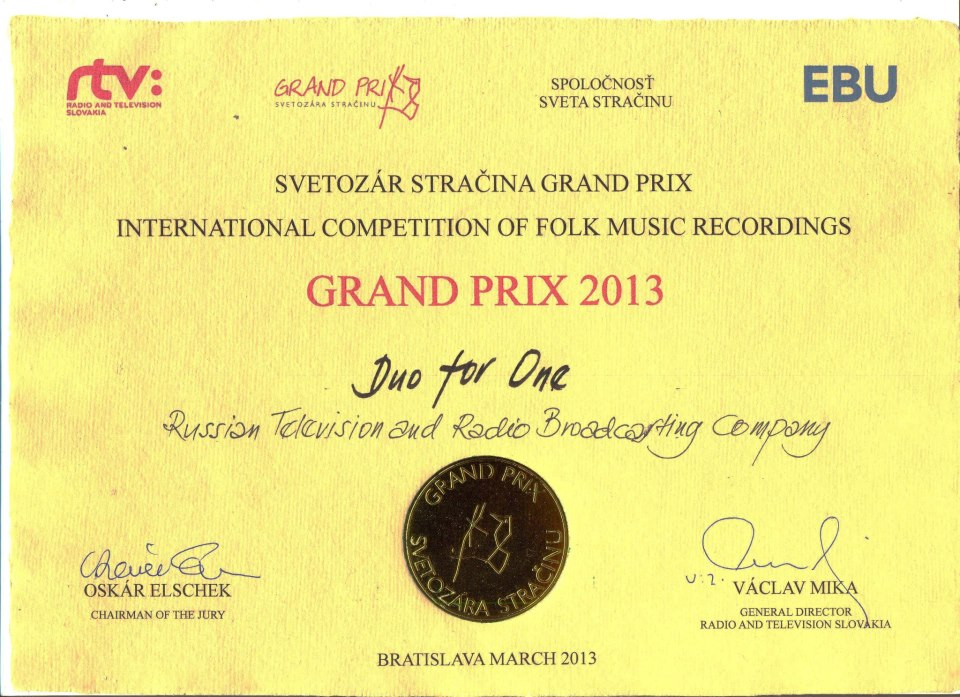
2013 Svetozar Stracina Grand Prix Diploma
