= Svirel =

Woodwind instrument

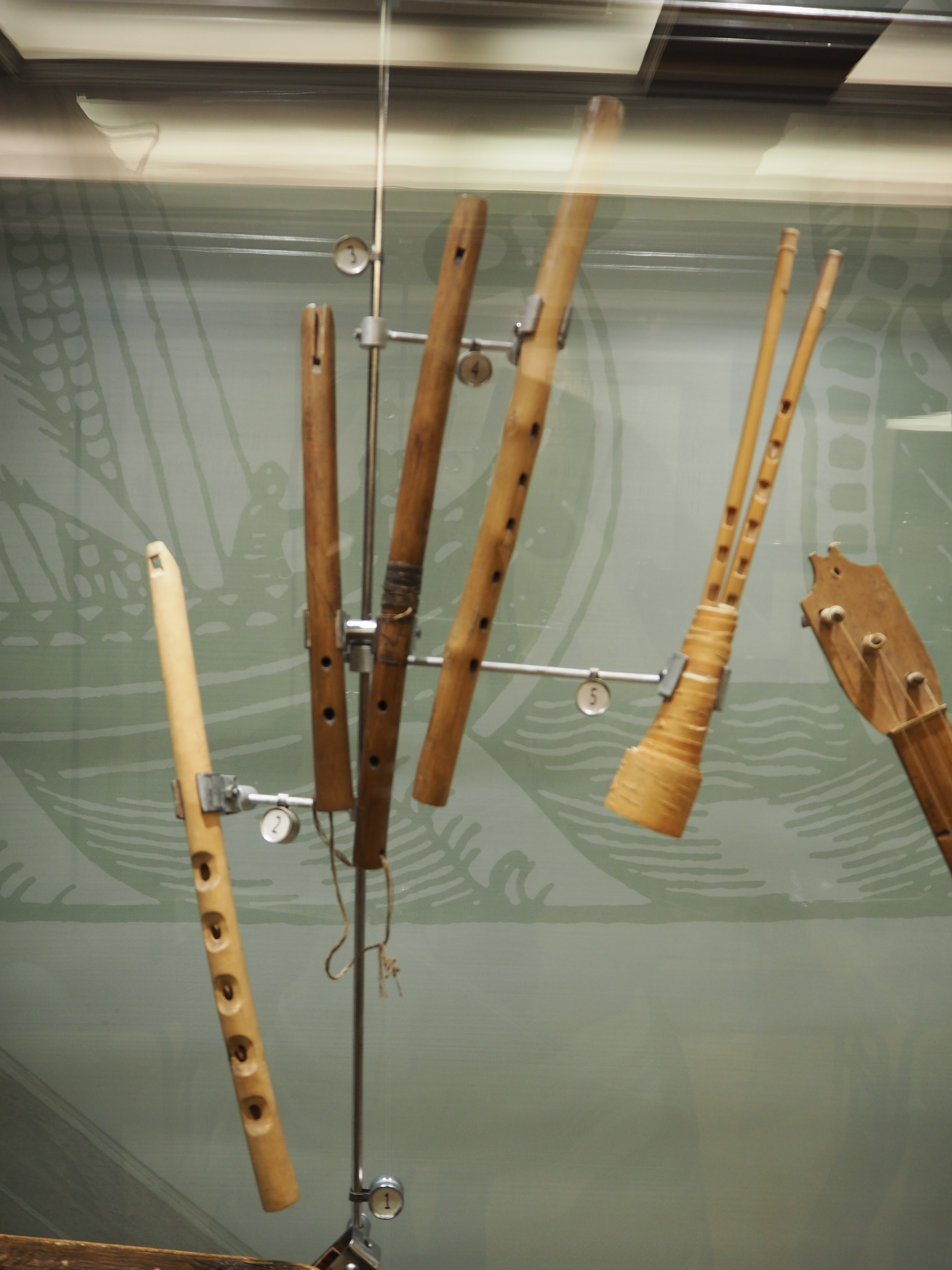
Different svirel exhibited at the museum of culture and music in Russia

Svirel (Russian: свирель) is a Slavic woodwind instrument of the end-blown flute type traditionally used in Russia, Belarus, and Ukraine. It is a parallel-bore flute. The six-hole versions are similar to the tin whistle; the ten-hole versions are fully chromatic.

The traditional Russian svirel has not been extensively studied. Specialists have long tried to relate the present day pipe instruments to their old Russian names. Most often, the chroniclers used three names for this type of instrument: svirel, sopel (sopilka) and tsevnitsa. The Ukrainian term for the instrument is sopilka and in Belarusian the term is dudka.

== Etymology ==
The word svirel is older in origin than sopel, as it can be found in Proto-Slavic. This suggests that the word predates the division of the Slavonic languages into its Eastern, Western, and Southern divisions. However, it is unknown if svirel referred to a specific instrument or to wind instruments generally. In the Kievan Rus' any wind instrument player (with the exception of horn or trumpet players) were called svirets or sviryanin.

== History ==
The Svirel-playing traditions of the Russians seem to be much older than the epoch of the Eastern Slavic community. Two such pipes were found during archeological excavations of the Old Novgorod from 1951 to 1962. One of them dates back to the late 11th century, is 22.5 cm (approximately 9 inches) long, and has four finger-holes. The second pipe dates to the early 15th century, is 19 cm (approximately 7.5 inches) long, and has only three holes.

However, it is difficult to say whether the Old Russian svirel had a double or a single pipe: there is no data about this preserved. What makes things still more complicated is the fact that names of similar instruments of kindred nations, such as Russians, Ukrainians and Belarusians are often mixed. N. I. Privalov fixed the name svirel to the double pipe, because this is how the instrument was referred to in the Smolensk region, the major area of its popularity. The single svirel came to be called sopel. In the modern day svirel more often refers to the end-blown flute type instrument, with a whistle device set into its upper part.

== Construction ==
In the Kievan Rus' this instrument was made either of hollow reed or cylindrical wood branches.

Svirel is a simple wooden (sometimes metal) pipe. On the upper end it has a beak-like whistle device and in the middle of the face side it has several (usually six) finger-holes cut out. The wooden pipe is commonly made of buckthorn, hazel, maple, ash, or bird cherry.

A circa-1950s variant has ten holes for a fully-chromatic fingering, and was patented by Dmitriy Demenchuk. The ability to change the angle of the instrument at the mouthpiece allows further tone adjustments.

In the early 20th century Vasily Andreyev introduced into his orchestra svirels with key mechanisms. Instruments of such construction still can be found in modern folk music orchestras.

== Playing technique ==
Double svirel has two similar pipes of different lengths. Each of the pipes has a whistle and three finger-holes. The size of the double svirel can vary greatly. The bigger pipe can be 29 to 47 cm long, and the smaller 22 to 35 cm. The big pipe is usually held in the right hand and the small one in the left hand.

Bringing together two pipes into one instrument makes it possible for one player to perform two-voice melodies. The repertoire of double svirel tunes are quite extensive and versatile. Double svirel was unevenly spread in Russia.

== See also ==
- Sopilka
- Baltic psaltery
