= Tuva constituency =

Russian legislative constituency

Tuva single-member constituency
- Constituency of the Russian State Duma

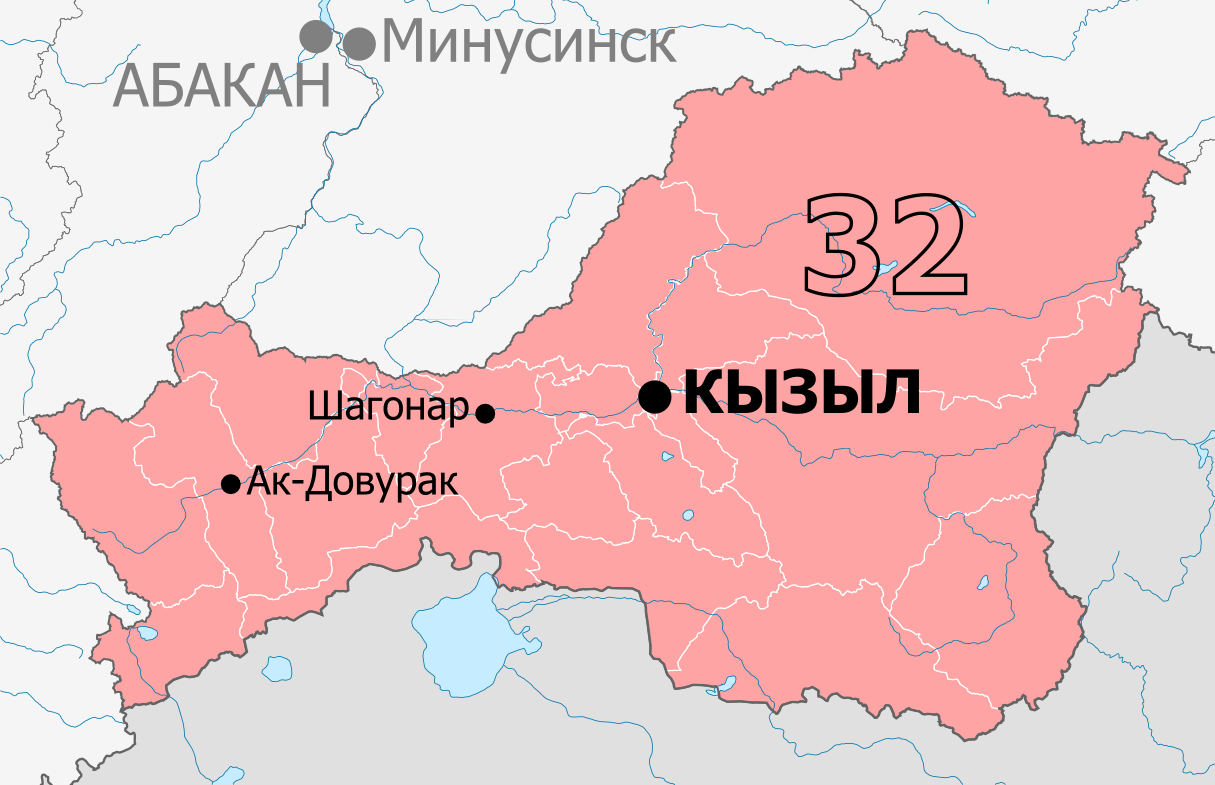
- Deputy: Buyan Kuular; United Russia
- Federal subject: Tyva Republic
- Districts: Ak-Dovurak, Bay-Tayginsky, Barun-Khemchiksky, Chaa-Kholsky, Chedi-Kholsky, Dzun-Khemchiksky, Erzinsky, Kaa-Khemsky, Kyzyl, Kyzylsky, Mongun-Tayginsky, Ovyursky, Piy-Khemsky, Sut-Kholsky, Tandinsky, Tere-Kholsky, Tes-Khemsky, Todzhinsky, Ulug-Khemsky
- Voters: 207,398 (2026)

The Tuva constituency (No.37 (Note: No.28 in 1993-1995 and 2003-2007, No.27 in 1995-2003, No.32 in 2016–2026)) is a Russian legislative constituency in Tuva. The constituency encompasses the entire territory of Tuva.

The constituency has been represented since 2026 by United Russia deputy Buyan Kuular, former Tuvan Minister of Youth Policy and retired Russian Army senior sergeant, who won the open seat left vacant after the resignation of one-term United Russia deputy Aidyn Saryglar.

== Boundaries ==
1993–2007, 2016–present: Ak-Dovurak, Bay-Tayginsky District, Barun-Khemchiksky District, Chaa-Kholsky District, Chedi-Kholsky District, Dzun-Khemchiksky District, Erzinsky District, Kaa-Khemsky District, Kyzyl, Kyzylsky District, Mongun-Tayginsky District, Ovyursky District, Piy-Khemsky District, Sut-Kholsky District, Tandinsky District, Tere-Kholsky District, (Note: split from Kyzylsky District in 2003) Tes-Khemsky District, Todzhinsky District, Ulug-Khemsky District
The constituency has been covering the entirety of Tuva since its initial creation in 1993.

== Members elected ==
Election	Member	Party
1993	Kara-Kys Arakchaa	Independent
1995	Galina Salchak	Our Home – Russia
1999	Nikolay Loktionov (Note: appointed Auditor of the Accounts Chamber of Russia in April 2001)	Unity
2001	Chylgychy Ondar	Independent
2003	Chylgychy Ondar	Independent
2007	Proportional representation - no election by constituency	
2011	Proportional representation - no election by constituency	
2016	Mergen Oorzhak	United Russia
2021	Aidyn Saryglar (Note: appointed Mayor of Kyzyl in December 2025)	United Russia
2026	Buyan Kuular	United Russia

== Election results ==
=== 1993 ===
==== Declared candidates ====
- Kara-Kys Arakchaa (Independent), chemistry leading researcher
- Vladimir Bagay-ool (Independent), advisor to President of the Republic of Tuva Sherig-ool Oorzhak
- Anatoly Damba-Khuurak (Independent), Prosecutor of Tuva (1992–present)
- Yury Komarov (Civic Union), former People's Deputy of the Soviet Union (1989–1991), construction executive

==== Results ====
Summary of the 12 December 1993 Russian legislative election in the Tuva constituency
Candidate	Party	Votes	%
Kara-Kys Arakchaa	Independent	30,554	28.37%
Anatoly Damba-Khuurak	Independent	24,331	22.59%
Vladimir Bagay-ool	Independent	23,510	21.83%
Yury Komarov	Civic Union	14,861	13.80%
against all		6,515	6.05%
Total		107,716	100%

=== 1995 ===
==== Declared candidates ====
- Kara-Kys Arakchaa (BIR), incumbent Member of State Duma (1994–present)
- Aleksandr Kashin (LDPR), coordinator of the party regional office
- Amur Khoyugban (Independent), Member of Great Khural of Tuva (1993–present)
- Viktor Molomday (Independent), businessman
- Sonchukchu Mongush (APR), experimental farm director
- Tatyana Nikolayeva (DVR–OD), Member of Great Khural of Tuva (1993–present)
- Altai Piche-ool (Independent), former People's Deputy of Russia (1990–1993)
- Galina Salchak (NDR), Minister of Finance of Tuva (1994–present)
- Vyacheslav Salchak (PGL), aide to State Duma member
- Anatoly Seren (CPRF), journalist
- Vladimir Serikov (Independent), military commissioner of Kyzyl (1995–present)

==== Withdrawn candidates ====
- Chylgychy Ondar (Independent), Deputy Premier of Tuva (1994–present) (endorsed Galina Salchak)

==== Results ====
Summary of the 17 December 1995 Russian legislative election in the Tuva constituency
Candidate	Party	Votes	%
Galina Salchak	Our Home – Russia	44,853	40.95%
Kara-Kys Arakchaa (incumbent)	Ivan Rybkin Bloc	25,350	23.14%
Aleksandr Kashin	Liberal Democratic Party	7,225	6.60%
Anatoly Seren	Communist Party	6,530	5.96%
Tatyana Nikolayeva	Democratic Choice of Russia – United Democrats	5,074	4.63%
Vladimir Serikov	Independent	3,683	3.36%
Sonchukchu Mongush	Agrarian Party	2,673	2.44%
Altai Piche-ool	Independent	2,386	2.18%
Amur Khoyugban	Independent	1,530	1.40%
Vyacheslav Salchak	Pamfilova–Gurov–Lysenko	1,445	1.32%
against all		3,541	3.23%
Total		109,530	100%

=== 1999 ===
Results by district: Nikolay Loktionov: 40–50% 50–60% 60–70% 70–80%; Galina Salchak: 40–50% 50–60% 60–70% 70–80%

==== Declared candidates ====
- Ostap Damba-Khuurak (LDPR), unemployed
- Sergey Konviz (Independent), businessman
- Nikolay Loktionov (Unity), Deputy Minister of Emergency Situations of Russia (1994–present), Internal Service colonel general
- Galina Salchak (OVR), incumbent Member of State Duma (1996–present)
- Natalia Tovuu (Independent), psychology associate professor

==== Failed to qualify ====
- Valery Salchak (NDR), former First Deputy Premier of Tuva – Minister of Economy (1990–1994)
- Anatoly Seren (DN), Chairman of the Tuva State Committee on Press and Information, 1995 CPRF candidate for this seat
- Aleksey Tevek (Independent), pensioner

==== Did not file ====
- Vladimir Biche-ool (Independent), Head of the Kyzyl Department of Social Development (1998–present)
- Valery Irgit (Independent), Member of Great Khural of Tuva (1999–present), retired KGB officer

==== Results ====
Summary of the 19 December 1999 Russian legislative election in the Tuva constituency
Candidate	Party	Votes	%
Nikolay Loktionov	Unity	55,823	50.06%
Galina Salchak (incumbent)	Fatherland – All Russia	43,280	38.81%
Ostap Damba-Khuurak	Liberal Democratic Party	2,724	2.44%
Sergey Konviz	Independent	1,976	1.77%
Natalia Tovuu	Independent	1,036	0.93%
against all		3,673	3.29%
Total		111,515	100%

=== 2001 ===
Results by district: Chylgychy Ondar: 30–40% 40–50% 50–60%; Sergey Mongush: 20–30% 40–50% 50–60%

==== Declared candidates ====
- Aleksandr Kashin (Independent), Mayor of Kyzyl (1998–present), 1995 candidate for this seat, 1997 presidential candidate
- Sergey Mongush (Independent), Minister of Internal Affairs of Tuva (1994–present), MVD major general
- Viktor Norbu (Independent), banker
- Chylgychy Ondar (Independent), Deputy Premier of Tuva (1994–present), 1995 candidate for this seat
- Vladimir Tavberidze (Independent), transportation businessman

==== Failed to qualify ====
- Kalin-ool Kuzhuget (Independent), geology leading researcher, uncle of Minister of Emergency Situations of Russia Sergey Shoigu

==== Did not file ====
- Artyk Khovalyg (Independent), writer

==== Results ====
Summary of the 14 October 2001 by-election in the Tuva constituency
Candidate	Party	Votes	%
Chylgychy Ondar	Independent	27,206	39.46%
Sergey Mongush	Independent	25,071	36.36%
Viktor Norbu	Independent	8,954	12.99%
Aleksandr Kashin	Independent	2,501	3.63%
Vladimir Tavberidze	Independent	773	1.12%
against all		2,275	3.30%
Total		68,945	100%

=== 2003 ===
==== Declared candidates ====
- Ivan Chuchev (CPRF), sovkhoz director
- Ostap Damba-Khuurak (LDPR), Member of Kyzyl City Khural, municipal enterprise director
- Eker-ool Manchyn (VR–ES), entrepreneur
- Chylgychy Ondar (Independent), incumbent Member of State Duma (2001–present)
- Vyacheslav Ushkalov (SDPR), Member of Great Khural of Tuva (1999–present)

==== Withdrawn candidates ====
- Sholban Kara-ool (United Russia), First Deputy Premier of Tuva – Minister of Trade, Consumer Services, and Entrepreneurship (2003–present), 2002 head candidate
- Olzey-ool Oorzhak (Independent), attorney

==== Did not file ====
- Vladimir Bagay-ool (Independent), former advisor to President of the Republic of Tuva Sherig-ool Oorzhak, 1993 candidate for this seat
- Aleksandr Kashin (Independent), former Mayor of Kyzyl (1998–2002), 1995 and 2001 candidate for this seat, 1997 and 2002 head candidate
- Sergey Kuular (Independent), unemployed
- Andrey Shumov (Independent), driver
- Aleksey Tevek (Independent), humanities senior researcher, 1999 candidate for this seat

==== Results ====
Summary of the 7 December 2003 Russian legislative election in the Tuva constituency
Candidate	Party	Votes	%
Chylgychy Ondar (incumbent)	Independent	53,899	61.24%
Ivan Chuchev	Communist Party	22,550	25.62%
Vyacheslav Ushkalov	Social Democratic Party	3,125	3.55%
Eker-ool Manchyn	Great Russia – Eurasian Union	2,255	2.56%
Ostap Damba-Khuurak	Liberal Democratic Party	1,149	1.31%
against all		3,351	3.81%
Total		88,163	100%

=== 2016 ===
==== Declared candidates ====
- Mergen Anai-ool (CPRF), Head of Ulug-Khemsky District (2012–present)
- Igor Frent (LDPR), driver
- Aibek Maady (CPCR), retired MVD officer
- Mongun-ool Mongush (PARNAS), former Member of Great Khural of Tuva (2002–2010)
- Mergen Oorzhak (United Russia), Senator from Tuva (2014–present)
- Valery Salchak (Yabloko), pensioner
- Vladimir Seren-Khuurak (A Just Russia), sports school deputy director

==== Withdrawn candidates ====
- Timur Naidyn (Independent), judicial clerk

==== Declined ====
- Viktor Glukhov (United Russia), Member of Great Khural of Tuva (2010–present) (lost the primary)
- Konstantin Mazurevsky (United Russia), first deputy head of the party central executive committee (2012–present), former Minister of Justice of Tuva (2008–2009) (lost the primary, ran on the party list)
- Larisa Shoigu (United Russia), Member of State Duma (2007–present) (won the primary, ran on the party list)

==== Results ====
Summary of the 18 September 2016 Russian legislative election in the Tuva constituency
Candidate	Party	Votes	%
Mergen Oorzhak	United Russia	108,896	77.39%
Mergen Anai-Ool	Communist Party	8,949	6.36%
Igor Frent	Liberal Democratic Party	5,721	4.07%
Vladimir Seren-Khuurak	A Just Russia	4,587	3.26%
Valery Salchak	Yabloko	4,189	2.98%
Mongun-ool Mongush	People's Freedom Party	3,117	2.22%
Aibek Maady	Communists of Russia	2,624	1.86%
Total		140,705	100%

=== 2021 ===
==== Declared candidates ====
- Ayas Chudaan-ool (Rodina), former Deputy Head of the Republic of Tuva (2016–2019)
- Eres Kara-Sal (LDPR), Member of Great Khural of Tuva (2020–present)
- Renat Oorzhak (SR–ZP), Commissioner for Entrepreneurs' Rights in Tuva (2020–present)
- Mikhail Sanchai (RPPSS), former First Deputy Prosecutor of Tuva
- Aidyn Saryglar (United Russia), Deputy Minister of Health of Tuva (2021–present)
- Ayan Soyan (The Greens), Head of Eer-Khavaksky Sumon
- Roman Tamoyev (CPRF), Member of Kyzyl Khural of Representatives (2018–present), first secretary of the party regional office

==== Did not file ====
- Irina Saaya (CPCR), perennial candidate

==== Declined ====
- Vitaly Bartyna-Sady (United Russia), former Member of Great Khural of Tuva (2002–2011, 2014–2019) (lost the primary)
- Yury Kara-ool (United Russia), Member of Great Khural of Tuva (1998–2002, 2006–present) (lost the primary)
- Ayana Mongush (United Russia), Member of Great Khural of Tuva (2019–present), middle school principal (lost the primary)
- Eduard Ondar (United Russia), actor (lost the primary)
- Mergen Oorzhak (United Russia), incumbent Member of State Duma (2016–present) (lost the primary)

==== Results ====
Summary of the 17-19 September 2021 Russian legislative election in the Tuva constituency
Candidate	Party	Votes	%
Aidyn Saryglar	United Russia	121,936	74.43%
Renat Oorzhak	A Just Russia — For Truth	14,717	8.98%
Roman Tamoyev	Communist Party	6,898	4.21%
Ayas Chudaan-ool	Rodina	6,625	4.04%
Eres Kara-Sal	Liberal Democratic Party	5,420	3.20%
Mikhail Sanchai	Party of Pensioners	2,983	1.82%
Ayan Soyan	The Greens	1,960	1.20%
Total		163,836	100%

=== 2026 ===
==== Declared candidates ====
- Yulia Arlanmay (LDPR), Member of Great Khural of Tuva (2024–present)
- Artysh Irgit (New People), nonprofit director, 2026 head candidate
- Aidysmaa Chadamba (CPRF), cosmetology lecturer
- Buyan Kuular (United Russia), Minister for Youth of Tuva (2025–present), Hero of Russia (2024)
- Denis Syaldyshev (A Just Russia), chairman of the Khakassia party regional office

==== Did not file ====
- Aziyat Dogdugash (A Just Russia), life safety teacher, chairman of the party regional office

==== Results ====
Summary of the 18-20 September 2026 Russian legislative election in the Tuva constituency
Candidate	Party	Votes	%
Buyan Kuular	United Russia	133,019	77.72%
Artysh Irgit	New People	12,435	7.27%
Aidysmaa Chadamba	Communist Party	10,028	5.86%
Yulia Arlanmay	Liberal Democratic Party	9,412	5.50%
Denis Syaldyshev	A Just Russia	5,733	3.35%
Total		171,153	100%
