= Ulug-Khemsky District =

Ulug-Khemsky District Улуг-Хемский кожуун (Russian)
- District

Other transcription(s)
  - Tuvan: Улуг-Хем кожуун
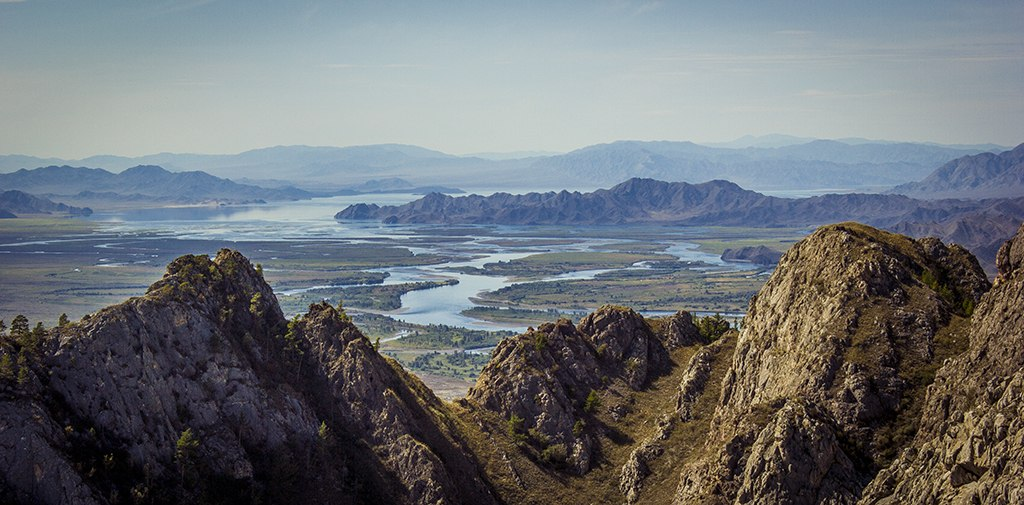
- View from Mount Khayyrakan in the westerly direction

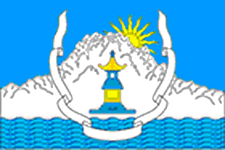
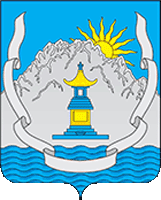
- Flag Coat of arms
- Location of Ulug-Khemsky District in the Tuva Republic
- Coordinates: 51°24′N 92°52′E
- Country: Russia
- Federal subject: Tuva Republic
- Established: September 8, 1923
- Administrative center: Shagonar

Area
  - Total: 5,335.40 km^{2} (2,060.01 sq mi)

Population (2010 Census)
  - Total: 19,266
  - Estimate (January 2014): 19,580
  - Density: 3.6110/km^{2} (9.3524/sq mi)
  - Urban: 56.9%
  - Rural: 43.1%

Administrative structure
  - Administrative divisions: 1 Towns under district jurisdiction (urban settlements), 9 Sumons
  - Inhabited localities: 1 cities/towns, 9 rural localities

Municipal structure
  - Municipally incorporated as: Ulug-Khemsky Municipal District
  - Municipal divisions: 1 urban settlements, 9 rural settlements
- Time zone: UTC+7 (MSK+4)
- OKTMO ID: 93654000
- Website: http://ulughem17.ru

Population of Ulug-Khemsky District
- 2010 Census: 19,266
- 2002 Census: 19,461
- 1989 Census: 29,866
- 1979 Census: 25,700

Ulug-Khemsky District (Russian: Улу́г-Хе́мский кожуун; Tuvan: Улуг-Хем кожуун, romanized: Ulug-Xem kojûn) is an administrative and municipal district (raion, or kozhuun), one of the seventeen in the Tuva Republic, Russia. It is located in the center of the republic and borders Yermakovsky District of Krasnoyarsk Krai in the north, Kyzylsky and Chedi-Kholsky Districts in the east, Ovyursky and Tes-Khemsky Districts in the south, and Chaa-Kholsky District in the west. The area of the district is 5,335.40 square kilometers (2,060.01 sq mi). Its administrative center is the town of Shagonar. As of the 2010 Census, the total population of the district was 19,266, with the population of Shagonar accounting for 56.9% of that number.

== History ==
Ulug-Khemsky Kozhuun was established within the Tuvan People's Republic on September 8, 1923. It became Ulug-Khemsky District on October 13, 1944, when the Tuvan People's Republic became a part of the Soviet Union. In 1957, its territory was enlarged by appending Bayan-Kolsky Selsoviet. In April 1961, Chaa-Kholsky District was merged into Ulug-Khemsky District. On February 25, 1975, Bayan-Kolsky Selsoviet was transferred back to Kyzylsky District, and Chaa-Kholsky District was split back out on December 20, 1991. When Chedi-Kholsky District was established on December 21, 1992, Khonderginsky Selsoviet of Ulug-Khemsky District was transferred to it.
