= Aidyn Saryglar =

Russian politician

- Айдын Сарыглар
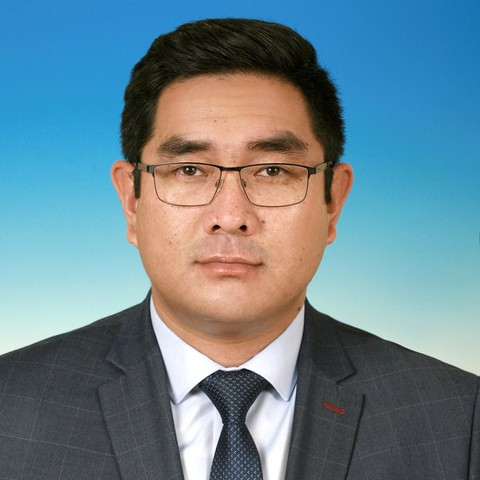
- official portrait, circa 2021

Member of the State Duma for Tuva
- Incumbent
- Assumed office 12 October 2021
- Preceded by: Mergen Oorzhak
- Constituency: Tuva-at-large (No. 32)

Personal details
- Born: 22 February 1988 (age 38) Saryg-Sep, Kaa-Khemsky District, Tuvan ASSR, USSR
- Party: United Russia
- Education: Moscow State University of Medicine and Dentistry

Aydyn Nikolayevich Saryglar (Russian: Айдын Николаевич Сарыглар; February 22, 1988, Saryg-Sep, Kaa-Khemsky District) is a Russian political figure and deputy of the 8th State Duma.

After graduating from the university, Saryglar worked as a traumatologist-orthopedist at the Republican Hospital No. 1 (Tuva Republic). On September 9, 2018, he was elected deputy of the Kyzyl City Duma. Since September 2021, he has served as deputy of the 8th State Duma.
