= Nikolai Abaev =

Soviet and Russian orientalist

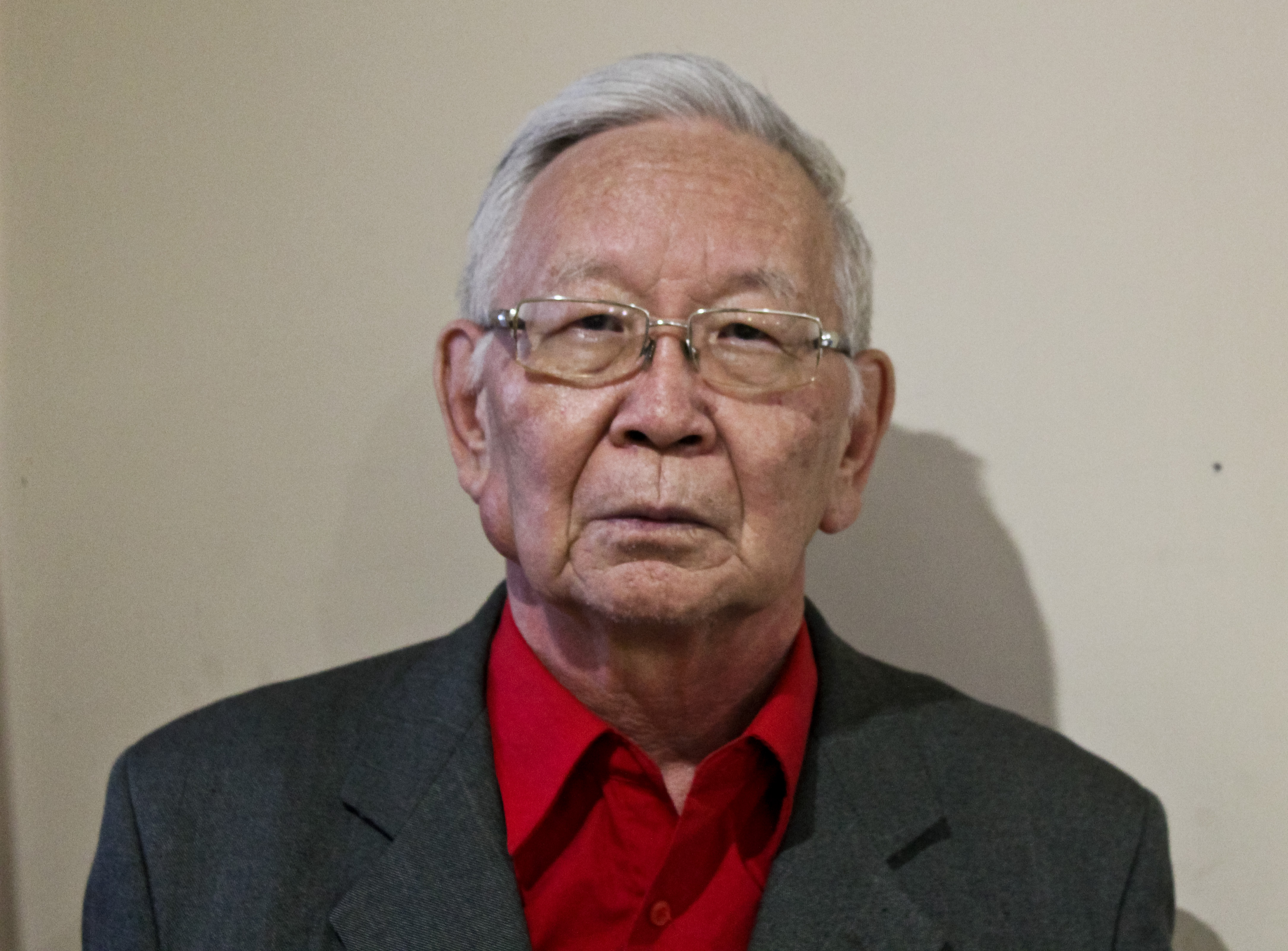
Abaev in 2019

Nikolai Vyacheslavovich Abaev (Russian: Николай Вячеславович Абаев; born October 7, 1949 in Toora-Khem, Todzhinsky Koshuun, Tuvan Autonomous Soviet Socialist Republic; died 2020 in Ulan-Ude, Buryatia, Russian Federation) was a Soviet and Russian Sinologist and Buddhologist and a figure in Zen (Chan)-Buddhism.

== Early life and education ==
Abaev was born in 1949 in the village of Toora-Khem, Todzhinsky District, Tuvan ASSR. In 1972, he graduated from the Faculty of Oriental Studies at Dagestan State University. He earned his PhD in 1978 and habilitated in 1991 in historical sciences.

== Career ==
Abaev conducted research at the Institute of Social Sciences of the Buryat Branch of the Siberian Branch of the Academy of Sciences of the USSR. (Note: Included the Institute of Social Sciences (BION) and Institute of Natural Sciences (BIEN))

He published over 300 scientific works in multiple languages. His main research interests included Buddhist philosophy and psychology, the culture of mental activity of the peoples of Central and Northeast Asia, ecological culture, ethno-confessional traditions of Turkic-Mongolian peoples in Inner Asia, Tengriist metaphysics, and its influence on political culture, thinking styles, and social behavior of Eurasian peoples.

He co-edited the Russian Encyclopedic dictionary on Chinese philosophy with Mikhail Leontievich Titarenko (ru).

== Selected publications ==
=== Monographs ===
- Чань-буддизм и культура психической деятельности в средневековом Китае / Отв. ред. Л. П. Делюсин. — Новосибирск: Наука : Сиб. отд-ние, 1983. — 123 с. // Chan Buddhism and the Culture of Mental Activity in Medieval China / Edited by Lev Deljusin. - Novosibirsk: Nauka: Siberian Branch, 1983. - 123 p.
- Чань-буддизм и культурно-психологические традиции в средневековом Китае / Отв. ред. Л. П. Делюсин; АН СССР, Сибирское отд-ние, Бурятского ин-т обществ. наук. — 2-е изд., перераб. и доп. — Новосибирск: Наука, 1989. — 271 с. — ISBN 5-02-029186-2. // Chan Buddhism and Cultural-Psychological Traditions in Medieval China / Edited by L. P. Deljusin; USSR Academy of Sciences, Siberian Branch, Buryat Institute of Social Sciences. - 2nd edition, revised and supplemented - Novosibirsk: Nauka, 1989. - 271 p. - ISBN 5-02-029186-2.
- Абаев Н. В., Горбунов И. В.: Сунь Лутан о философско-психологических основах "внутренних" школ у-шу / Российская акад. наук, Сибирское отд-ние, Бурятский ин-т обществ. наук. — Новосибирск: Наука, Сибирское отд-ние, 1992. — 168 с. — ISBN 5-02-029746-1. // Abaev N. V., Gorbunov I. V.: Sun Lutang on the Philosophical and Psychological Foundations of the "Internal" Wushu Schools / Russian Academy of Sciences, Siberian Branch, Buryat Institute of Social Sciences. - Novosibirsk: Nauka, Siberian Branch, 1992. - 168 p. - ISBN 5-02-029746-1.
- Концепция «просветления» в «Махаяна-шрад-дхотпадашастре» // Психологические аспекты буддизма. — Новосибирск: Наука, 1986. // The Concept of "Enlightenment" in the Mahayanashraddhotpadashastra // Psychological Aspects of Buddhism. - Novosibirsk: Nauka, 1986.
- Цивилизационная геополитика народов Алтай-Байкальского региона и Центральной Азии. — Кызыл: Изд-во ТывГУ, 2007. — 160 с. — ISBN 5-91178-013-5. // Civilizational Geopolitics of the Peoples of the Altai-Baikal Region and Central Asia. - Kyzyl: Tuva State University Press, 2007. - 160 p. - ISBN 5-91178-013-5.
- Абаев Н. В., Аюпов Н. Г.: Тэнгрианская цивилизация в духовно-культурном и геополитическом пространстве Центральной Азии / Междунар. Фонд по изучению Тенгри, Фонд Центрально-Евразийского наследия. — Абакан: Лаб. "кочевых" цивилизаций ТывГУ, 2009. — 21 с. // Abaev N. V., Ayupov N. G.: The Tengri Civilization in the Spiritual-Cultural and Geopolitical Space of Central Asia / International Tengri Research Foundation, Foundation for the Central Eurasian Heritage. - Abakan: Laboratory "Nomadic" Civilizations of Tuvan State University, 2009. - 21 p.
- Абаев Н. В., Опей-оол У. П.: Тэнгрианство, буддизм и экологические культы в Центральной Азии и Транс-Саянии. — Кызыл: Нац. музей Республики Тыва, 2009. — 143 с. // Abaev N. V., Opey-ool U. P.: Tengrism, Buddhism and Ecological Cults in Central Asia and Trans-Sayan. - Kyzyl: National Museum of the Republic of Tuva, 2009. - 143 p.
- Абаев Н. В., Аюпов Н. Г.: Этноэкологические традиции тюрко-монгольских народов в тэнгрианско-буддийской цивилизации Внутренней Азии : издание научное (монография). — Кызыл: Ред.-изд. отд. ТывГУ, 2010. — 135 с. — ISBN 978-5-91178-040-1. // Abaev N. V., Ayupov N. G.: Ethno-Ecological Traditions of the Turkic-Mongolian Peoples in the Tengrism-Buddhist Civilization of Inner Asia: Scientific Edition (Monograph). - Kyzyl: Editorial Department of Tuva State University, 2010. - 135 p. - ISBN 978-5-91178-040-1.
- Абаев Н. В., Хомушку О. М.: Духовно-культурные традиции в геополитическом и цивилизационном пространстве Центральной Азии и Саяно-Алтая: монографическое исследование. — Кызыл: ТывГУ, 2010. — 283 с. // Abaev N. V., Homushku O. M.: Spiritual and Cultural Traditions in the Geopolitical and Civilizational Space of Central Asia and Sayan-Altai: Monographic Study. - Kyzyl: Tuva State University, 2010. - 283 p.
- Влияние тэнгриантства на экологическую культуру и этногенез тюрко-монгольских народов Алтай-Байкалии: издание научное : (монография). — Н. Новгород: MOBY publishing, 2011. — 150 с. — ISBN 978-5-4434-0002-0. // The Influence of Tengrism on the Ecological Culture and Ethnogenesis of the Turkic-Mongolian Peoples of the Altai-Baikal Region: Scientific Publication (Monograph). - N. Novgorod: MOBY Publishing, 2011. - 150 p. - ISBN 978-5-4434-0002-0.
- Культ священных гор и тэнгрианский эпос бурят-монголов. — Иркутск: Оттиск, 2014. — 127 с. — ISBN 978-5-90584787-5. // The Cult of Sacred Mountains and the Tengrism Epic of the Buryat-Mongols. - Irkutsk: Ottisk, 2014. - 127 p. - ISBN 978-5-90584787-5.
- Архаические формы религии и тэнгрианство в этнокультурогенезе народов Внутренней Азии / отв. ред. Н. И. Атанов. — Улан-Удэ: Бурятский государственный университет, 2015. — 248 с. — ISBN 978-5-9793-0762-6. // Abaev N. V.: Archaic Forms of Religion and Tengrism in the Ethnocultural Genesis of the Peoples of Inner Asia / Edited by N. I. Atanov. - Ulan-Ude: Buryat State University, 2015. - 248 p. - ISBN 978-5-9793-0762-6.
- Абаев Н. В., Хобраков Ц. С.: Бурят-монгольская школа единоборства "Шонын-баша" (Стиль Небесного Волка) / Бурятский гос. ун-т, Ин-т Внутренней Азии, Лаб. цивилизационной геополитики Евразии. — Улан-Удэ: Изд-во Бурятского государственного университета, 2015. — 145 с. — ISBN 978-5-9793-0725-1. // Abaev N. V., Khobrakov C. S.: The Buryat-Mongolian School of Martial Arts "Shonyn-Basha" (Heavenly Wolf Style) / Buryat State University, Inner Asia Institute, Eurasia Civilization Geopolitics Lab. - Ulan-Ude: Buryat State University Press, 2015. - 145 p. - ISBN 978-5-9793-0725-1.
- Этимологический словарь тэнгрианских терминов бурят-монголов. // Вестник Бурятского государственного университета. Сер.: Гуманитарные исследования Внутренней Азии. — 2017. — Вып. No. 1. — С. 106–112.; Вып. No. 2. — С. 110–112.; Вып. No. 4. — С. 111–112. — ISSN 2305-753X // Etymological Dictionary of Tengrism Terms of the Buryat-Mongols. // Bulletin of Buryat State University. Series: Humanities Research of Inner Asia. - 2017. - Issue No. 1. - pp. 106–112; Issue No. 2. - pp. 110–112; Issue No. 4. - pp. 111–112. - ISSN 2305-753X.
- Этимологический словарь тэнгрианских терминов бурят-монголов. / Лаборатория БГУ. — Улан-Удэ : ООО «Амирит» ; Raleigh, NC : Lulu Press, Inc., 2019. — 120 с. — ISBN 978-0-244-44858-5. — ISBN 978-0-244-74858-6. // Etymological Dictionary of Tengrism Terms of the Buryat-Mongols. / Laboratory of BGU. - Ulan-Ude : Amirit Ltd ; Raleigh, NC : Lulu Press, Inc., 2019. - 120 p. - ISBN 978-0-244-44858-5. - ISBN 978-0-244-74858-6.

=== Articles ===
==== Russian ====
- О соотношении теории и практики в чань-буддизме // 7-я науч. конф. «Общество и государство в Китае». — М.: Наука, 1976. — С. 618–625. // On the Relationship between Theory and Practice in Chan Buddhism // 7th Scientific Conference "Society and State in China". - Moscow: Nauka, 1976. - pp. 618–625.
- Влияние чань-буддизма на тайные религиозные общества группы Байлянь // Проблемы современного Китая: Сб. ст. по материалам VII науч. конф. молодых науч. сотр. ИДВ АН СССР, март 1976 г.. — М., 1977. — С. 69–88. // Abaev N. V.: The Influence of Chan Buddhism on the Secret Religious Societies of the Bailian Group // Problems of Modern China: Collection of Articles based on the Materials of the VII Scientific Conference of Young Researchers of the Institute of Far Eastern Studies of the USSR Academy of Sciences, March 1976. - Moscow, 1977. - pp. 69–88.
- Чань-буддизм и у-шу // Народы Азии и Африки. — 1981. — No. 3. — С. 63–74. // Chan Buddhism and Wushu // Peoples of Asia and Africa. - 1981. - No. 3. - pp. 63–74.
- Человек и природа в даосизме и буддизме // Общественные науки за рубежом. Сер. 9. Востоковедение и африканистика. — М., 1981. — No. 2. — С. 213–217. // Man and Nature in Taoism and Buddhism // Social Sciences Abroad. Ser. 9. Oriental and African Studies. - Moscow, 1981. - No. 2. - pp. 213–217.
- О некоторых философско-психологических аспектах чаньских военно-прикладных искусств // Общество и государство в Китае. — М.: Наука, 1981. — С. 221–234. // On Some Philosophical and Psychological Aspects of Chan Martial Arts // Society and State in China. - Moscow: Nauka, 1981. - pp. 221–234.
- Даосские истоки китайских у-шу // Дао и даосизм в Китае. — М.: Наука, 1982. — С. 244–257. // The Taoist Origins of Chinese Wushu // Dao and Daoism in China. - Moscow: Nauka, 1982. - pp. 244–257.
- О культуре психической деятельности в традиционном Китае // XIII науч. конф. «Общество и государство в Китае». — М., 1982. — С. 161–166. // On the Culture of Mental Activity in Traditional China // XIII Scientific Conference "Society and State in China". - Moscow, 1982. - pp. 161–166.
- Об искусстве психической саморегуляции (айкидо, каратэ) // Наука в Сибири. — 1983. — No. 2. — С. 7. // On the Art of Mental Self-Regulation (Aikido, Karate) // Science in Siberia. - 1983. - No. 2. - p. 7.
- Фельдман В. Р., Абаев Н. В.: Цивилизация народов Центральной Азии: субстанциональные основания бытия // Вестник Бурятского государственного университета. — 2014. — No. 6 (1). — С. 3–8. // Feldman V. R., Abaev N. V.: Civilization of the Peoples of Central Asia: Substantial Foundations of Being // Bulletin of Buryat State University. - 2014. - No. 6 (1). - pp. 3–8.
- Тэнгрианство, митраизм и общие этнокультурные истоки туранскоарийской цивилизации Центральной и Внутренней Азии // Вестник Бурятского государственного университета. — 2015. — No. 3. — С. 42–59. // Tengrism, Mithraism, and the Common Ethnocultural Origins of the Turano-Aryan Civilization of Central and Inner Asia // Bulletin of Buryat State University. - 2015. - No. 3. - pp. 42–59.

==== Other languages ====
- Abaev N. V.: Geopolitical and Ethnocultural Aspects of Russian Border Area Regional Security under the Circumstances of Socio-Cultural Transit of Eurasian Civilization // Journal of Siberian Federal University. Humanities & Social Sciences. — 2013. — Vol. 6, No. 5. — pp. 724–734. — ISSN 1997-1370.
- Abaev N. V., Zhuk O. V.: Historiography of the Old Belief and Researchers Coming from the Old Believers in the Baikal Region // Journal of Siberian Federal University. Humanities & Social Sciences. — 2018. — Vol. 11, No. 8. — pp. 1174–1187. — ISSN 1997-1370. — doi:10.17516/1997-1370-0300.

== Bibliography ==
- “Абаев, Николай Вячеславович”, in: Китайская философия: энциклопедический словарь. 1994
