= Administrative divisions of the Tuva Republic =

Administrative districts of Russian federal subject

Tuva Republic Russia
- Capital: Kyzyl

Administrative structure (as of 2015)
- Districts: 17
- Cities/towns: 5
- Urban-type settlements: 1
- sumons: 117

Municipal structure (as of 2002)
- Rural settlements: 389 (inhabited); 46 (uninhabited)

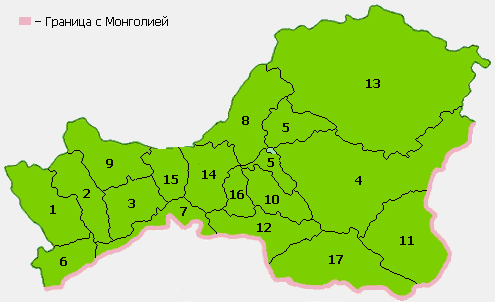
Map of the Tuva Republic (with numbered)

The administrative-territorial structure of the Tuva Republic in 2008–2011 was regulated by the Law #627 VKh-2, adopted on March 19, 2008. According to the law, the units of the administrative division mirror the municipal divisions of the republic and include the municipal districts, urban okrugs, urban settlements, and rural settlements.

The law also allows the use of alternative terminology to refer to the units of the administrative divisions. The term "municipal district" is used on par with the ethnic term "kozhuun", while the term "rural settlement" is used on par with the ethnic term "sumon".

"Kozhuun" (Russian and Tuvan: кожуун) is the Tuvan term of a historical feudal administrative division known as a banner. Tuva historically had nine kozhuuns named Tozhu, Salchak, Oyunnar, Khemchik, Khaasuut, Shalyk, Nibazy, Daa-van and Choodu, and Beezi. Each kozhuun was divided into sumu which was then subdivided into arban. In modern Tuva, the term "arban" is still used to refer to a type of rural locality, which has a population of fewer than 500 inhabitants and no independent budget.

== Administrative and municipal divisions ==
Map

Division	Structure		OKATO	OKTMO	Urban-type settlement/ district-level town*	Rural (sumon)
Division	Administrative	Municipal	OKATO	OKTMO	Urban-type settlement/ district-level town*	Rural (sumon)
Kyzyl (Кызыл)	city	urban okrug	93 401	93 701		
Ak-Dovurak (Ак-Довурак)	city	urban okrug	93 403	93 703		
Bay-Tayginsky (Бай-Тайгинский)	kozhuun	district	93 205	93 605		7
Barun-Khemchiksky (Барун-Хемчикский)	kozhuun	district	93 210	93 610		9
Dzun-Khemchiksky (Дзун-Хемчикский)	kozhuun	district	93 215	93 615	Chadan (Чадан) town*	11
Kaa-Khemsky (Каа-Хемский)	kozhuun	district	93 220	93 620		11
Kyzylsky (Кызылский)	kozhuun	district	93 222	93 622	Kaa-Khem (Каа-Хем)	9
Mongun-Tayginsky (Монгун-Тайгинский)	kozhuun	district	93 225	93 625		2
Ovyursky (Овюрский)	kozhuun	district	93 230	93 630		6
Piy-Khemsky (Пий-Хемский)	kozhuun	district	93 235	93 635	Turan (Туран) town*	7
Sut-Kholsky (Сут-Хольский)	kozhuun	district	93 238	93 638		7
Tandinsky (Тандинский)	kozhuun	district	93 240	93 640		8
Tere-Kholsky (Тере-Хольский)	kozhuun	district	93 243	93 643		1
Tes-Khemsky (Тес-Хемский)	kozhuun	district	93 245	93 645		8
Todzhinsky (Тоджинский)	kozhuun	district	93 250	93 650		6
Ulug-Khemsky (Улуг-Хемский)	kozhuun	district	93 254	93 654	Shagonar (Шагонар) town*	9
Chaa-Kholsky (Чаа-Хольский)	kozhuun	district	93 256	93 656		4
Chedi-Kholsky (Чеди-Хольский)	kozhuun	district	93 257	93 657		6
Erzinsky (Эрзинский)	kozhuun	district	93 258	93 658		6
