= Teeli =

Teeli Тээли
- Selo

Other transcription(s)
  - Tuvan: Тээли
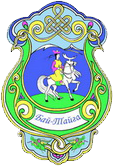
- Flag Coat of arms
- Interactive map of Teeli
- Location of Teeli Teeli (Tuva Republic)
- Coordinates: 51°00′31″N 90°12′33″E
- Country: Russia
- Federal subject: Tuva
- Administrative district: Bay-Tayginsky District
- SumonSelsoviet: Teelinsky

Population (2010 Census)
  - Total: 3,390
  - Estimate (2021): 3,441 (+1.5%)

Administrative status
  - Capital of: Bay-Tayginsky District, Teelinsky Sumon

Municipal status
  - Municipal district: Bay-Tayginsky Municipal District
  - Rural settlement: Teelinsky Sumon Rural Settlement
  - Capital of: Bay-Tayginsky Municipal District, Teelinsky Sumon Rural Settlement
- Time zone: UTC+7 (MSK+4)
- Postal code: 668010
- OKTMO ID: 93605444101

Teeli (Russian: Тээли; Tuvan: Тээли) is a rural locality (a selo) and the administrative center of Bay-Tayginsky District of Tuva, Russia. Population: 3,390 (2010 census); 3,764 (2002 census); 3,708 (1989 Soviet census).

== Geography ==
The village is located in the west of Tuva, 40 km from Ak-Dovurak and 349 km from Kyzyl at the beginning of the Teeli - Kyzyl highway. It sits at the foothill of the Altai mountain range.
