= Sug-Aksy =

Sug-Aksy Суг-Аксы
- Selo

Other transcription(s)
  - Tuvan: Суг-Аксы
- Flag
- Interactive map of Sug-Aksy
- Location of Sug-Aksy Sug-Aksy (Tuva Republic)
- Coordinates: 51°24′09″N 91°16′37″E
- Country: Russia
- Federal subject: Tuva
- Administrative district: Sut-Kholsky District
- SumonSelsoviet: Sug-Aksynsky

Population (2010 Census)
  - Total: 3,184
  - Estimate (2021): 3,307 (+3.9%)

Administrative status
  - Capital of: Sut-Kholsky District, Sug-Aksynsky Sumon

Municipal status
  - Municipal district: Sut-Kholsky Municipal District
  - Rural settlement: Sug-Aksynsky Sumon Rural Settlement
  - Capital of: Sut-Kholsky Municipal District, Sug-Aksynsky Sumon Rural Settlement
- Time zone: UTC+7 (MSK+4)
- Postal code: 668150
- OKTMO ID: 93638427101

Sug-Aksy (Russian: Суг-Аксы; Tuvan: Суг-Аксы, romanized: Sug-Aksı) is a rural locality (a selo) and the administrative center of Sut-Kholsky District of Tuva, Russia. Population: 3,184 (2010 census); 3,077 (2002 census); 3,045 (1989 Soviet census).

== Etymology ==
From Tuvan Sug-Aksy is translated as sug - “water, river”, aksy - “mouth of the river”.

== History ==
The first houses in the village appeared in 1938. In 1940, the first school was opened in the village of Sut-Khol, the director of which was Ivan Chadamovich Onamchal. In 1942-1943, the first cultural center was built, combined with a first-aid post.

Until 1991 it was called Sut-Khol.

In 2008-2010, the Buddhist temple “Dupten Sheduplin” was built in Sug-Aksy.

== Geography ==
Located 260 km west of Kyzyl on the banks of the Khemchik River.
