= Kungurtug =

Kungurtug Кунгуртуг
- Selo

Other transcription(s)
  - Tuvan: Кунгуртуг
- Flag
- Interactive map of Kungurtug
- Location of Kungurtug Kungurtug (Tuva Republic)
- Coordinates: 50°35′48″N 97°31′34″E
- Country: Russia
- Federal subject: Tuva
- Administrative district: Tere-Kholsky District
- SumonSelsoviet: Shynaansky

Population (2010 Census)
  - Total: 1,467
  - Estimate (2021): 1,638 (+11.7%)

Administrative status
  - Capital of: Tere-Kholsky District, Shynaansky Sumon

Municipal status
  - Municipal district: Tere-Kholsky Municipal District
  - Rural settlement: Shynaansky Sumon Rural Settlement
  - Capital of: Tere-Kholsky Municipal District, Shynaansky Sumon Rural Settlement
- Time zone: UTC+7 (MSK+4)
- Postal code: 667903
- OKTMO ID: 93643425101

Kungurtug (Russian: Кунгуртуг; Tuvan: Кунгуртуг) is a rural locality (a selo) and the administrative center of Tere-Kholsky District of Tuva, Russia. Population: 1,467 (2010 census); 1,835 (2002 census);
