= Khovu-Aksy =

Khovu-Aksy Хову́-Аксы́
- Selo

Other transcription(s)
  - Tuvan: Хову-Аксы

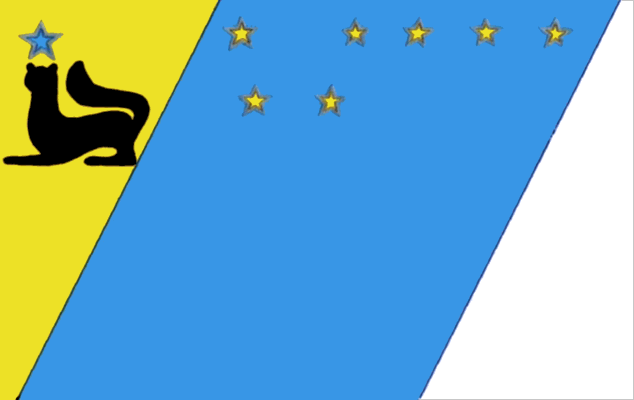
- Flag
- Interactive map of Khovu-Aksy
- Location of Khovu-Aksy Khovu-Aksy (Tuva Republic)
- Coordinates: 51°8′N 93°43′E
- Country: Russia
- Federal subject: Tuva
- Administrative district: Chedi-Kholsky District
- SumonSelsoviet: Khovu-Aksy

Population (2010 Census)
  - Total: 3,672
  - Estimate (2021): 3,612 (−1.6%)

Administrative status
  - Capital of: Chedi-Kholsky District, Khovu-Aksy Sumon

Municipal status
  - Municipal district: Chedi-Kholsky Municipal District
  - Rural settlement: Khovu-Aksy Sumon Rural Settlement
  - Capital of: Chedi-Kholsky Municipal District, Khovu-Aksy Sumon Rural Settlement
- Time zone: UTC+7 (MSK+4)
- Postal code: 668330
- Dialing code: +7 39452
- OKTMO ID: 93657405101

Khovu-Aksy (Russian: Хову-Аксы; Tuvan: Хову-Аксы, romanized: Xovu-Aksı) is a rural locality (a selo) and the administrative center of Chedi-Kholsky District of Tuva, Russia. Population: 3,672 (2010 census); 3,706 (2002 census); 5,925 (1989 Soviet census).

The cobalt and nickel ore deposit at Khovu-Aksy is the type locality of five minerals: argentopentlandite, lazarenkoite, shubnikovite, smolyaninovite, and vladimirite.
