= Khandagayty =

Khandagayty Хандагайты
- Selo

Other transcription(s)
  - Tuvan: Хандагайты
- Interactive map of Khandagayty
- Location of Khandagayty Khandagayty (Tuva Republic)
- Coordinates: 50°44′07″N 92°04′07″E
- Country: Russia
- Federal subject: Tuva
- Administrative district: Ovyursky District
- SumonSelsoviet: Khandagaytinsky

Population (2010 Census)
  - Total: 3,207
  - Estimate (2021): 3,528 (+10%)

Administrative status
  - Capital of: Ovyursky District, Khandagaytinsky Sumon

Municipal status
  - Municipal district: Ovyursky Municipal District
  - Rural settlement: Khandagaytinsky Sumon Rural Settlement
  - Capital of: Ovyursky Municipal District, Khandagaytinsky Sumon Rural Settlement
- Time zone: UTC+7 (MSK+4)
- Postal code: 668130
- OKTMO ID: 93630444101

Khandagayty (Russian: Хандагайты; Tuvan: Хандагайты, romanized: Xandagaytı) is a rural locality (a selo) and the administrative center of Ovyursky District of Tuva, Russia. Population: 3,207 (2010 census); 3,173 (2002 census); 2,930 (1989 Soviet census).
