= Kyzyl-Mazhalyk =

Kyzyl-Mazhalyk Кызыл-Мажалык
- Selo

Other transcription(s)
  - Tuvan: Кызыл-Мажалык
- Interactive map of Kyzyl-Mazhalyk
- Location of Kyzyl-Mazhalyk Kyzyl-Mazhalyk (Tuva Republic)
- Coordinates: 51°08′42″N 90°35′00″E
- Country: Russia
- Federal subject: Tuva
- Administrative district: Barun-Khemchiksky District
- SumonSelsoviet: Teelinsky

Population (2010 Census)
  - Total: 5,072
  - Estimate (2021): 4,546 (−10.4%)

Administrative status
  - Capital of: Barun-Khemchiksky District, Kyzyl-Mazhalyksky Sumon

Municipal status
  - Municipal district: Barun-Khemchiksky Municipal District
  - Rural settlement: Kyzyl-Mazhalyksky Sumon Rural Settlement
  - Capital of: Barun-Khemchiksky Municipal District, Kyzyl-Mazhalyksky Sumon Rural Settlement
- Time zone: UTC+7 (MSK+4)
- Postal code: 668040
- OKTMO ID: 93610430101

Kyzyl-Mazhalyk (Russian: Кызыл-Мажалык; Tuvan: Кызыл-Мажалык, romanized: Kızıl-Majalık) is a rural locality (a selo) and the administrative centre of Barun-Khemchiksky District of Tuva, Russia. Population: 5,072 (2010 census); 5,046 (2002 census); 5,754 (1989 Soviet census).

== Etymology ==
The settlement is located on the Mazhalyk River. The toponym is of Turkic origin and consists of the words: kyzyl - “red”, and Mazhalyk in the Tuvan language means “hill".
