= Todzhinsky District =

Todzhinsky District Тоджинский кожуун (Russian)
- District

Other transcription(s)
  - Tuvan: Тожу кожуун
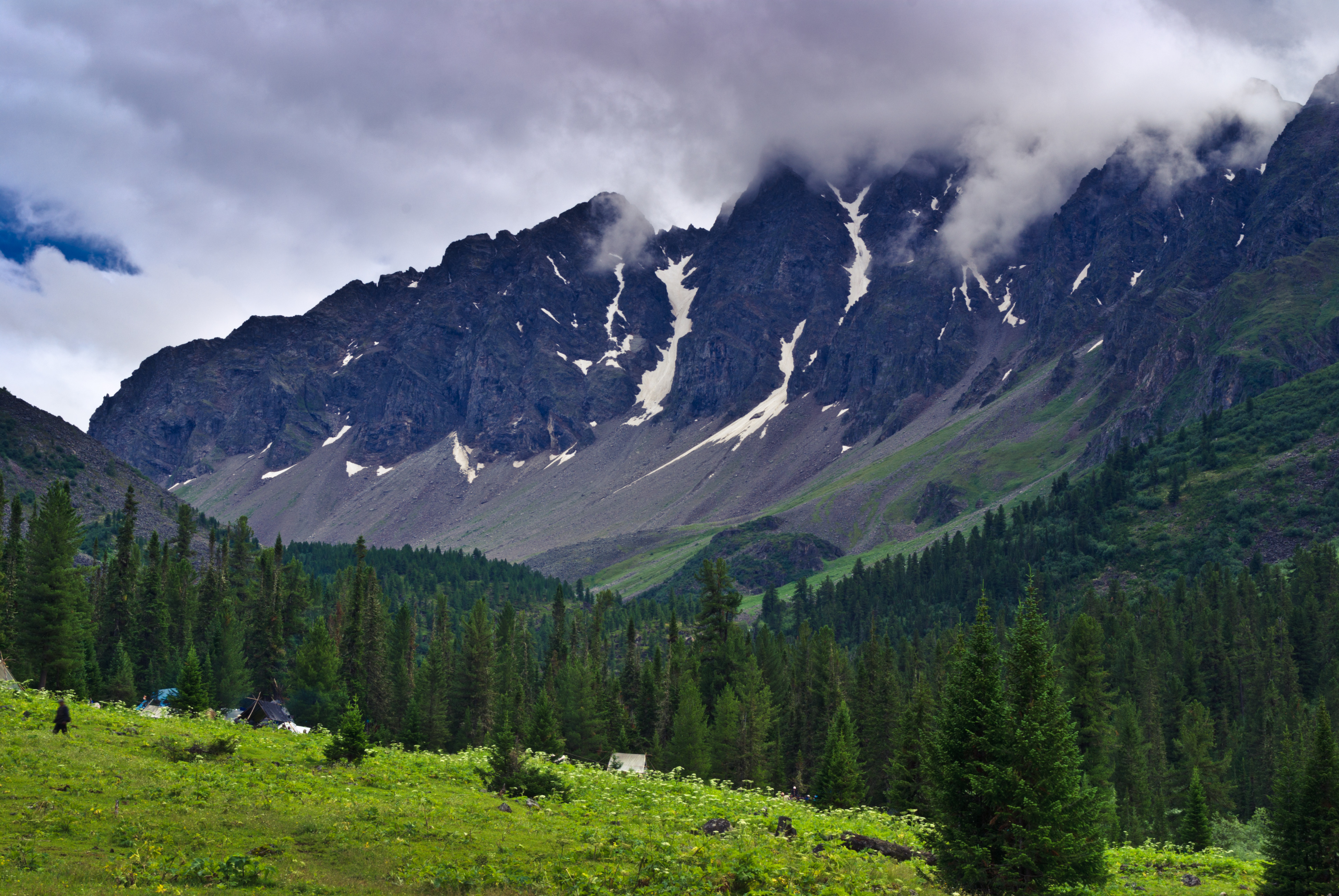
- Sayan, in Todzhinsky District

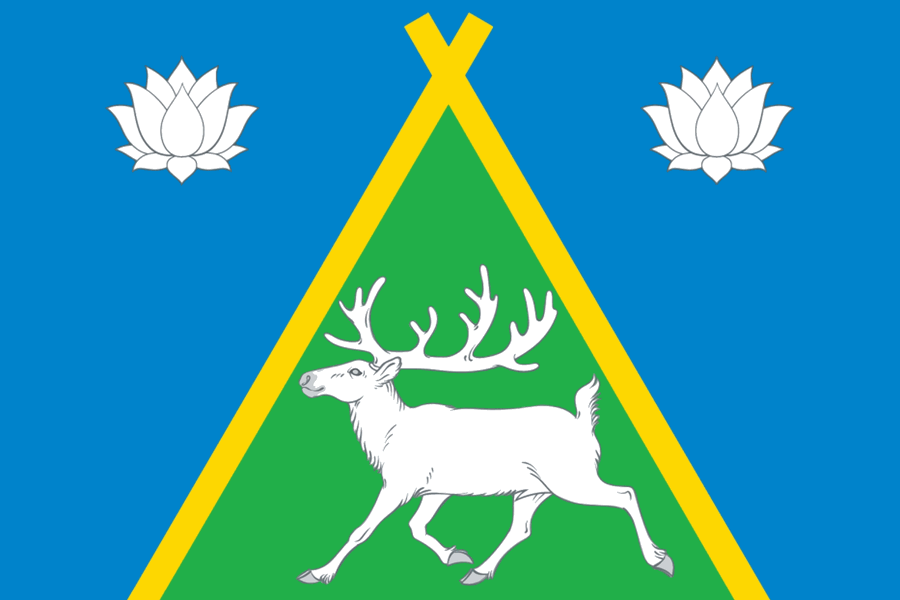
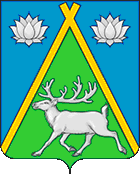
- Flag Coat of arms
- Location of Todzhinsky District in the Tuva Republic
- Coordinates: 52.778°N 96.911°E
- Country: Russia
- Federal subject: Tuva Republic
- Administrative center: Toora-Khem

Area
  - Total: 44,800 km^{2} (17,300 sq mi)

Population (2010 Census)
  - Total: 6,020
  - Density: 0.134/km^{2} (0.348/sq mi)
  - Urban: 0%
  - Rural: 100%

Administrative structure
  - Administrative divisions: 6 sumon
  - Inhabited localities: 7 rural localities

Municipal structure
  - Municipally incorporated as: Todzhinsky Municipal District
  - Municipal divisions: 0 urban settlements, 6 rural settlements
- Time zone: UTC+7 (MSK+4)
- OKTMO ID: 93650000
- Website: http://todzhinsky.ru/

Todzhinsky District (Russian: Тоджи́нский кожуун; Tuvan: Тожу кожуун, Toju kojuun) is an administrative and municipal district (raion, or kozhuun), one of the seventeen in the Tuva Republic, Russia. It is located in the northeast of the republic. The area of the district is 44,800 square kilometers (17,300 sq mi). Its administrative center is the rural locality (a selo) of Toora-Khem. Population: 6,020 (2010 census); 5,931 (2002 Census); 6,448 (1989 Soviet census). The population of Toora-Khem accounts for 39.7% of the district's total population.

== Geography and economy ==
The district is located in the isolated part of the republic, far from its developed regions. As a result, its location impedes the economic development of the territory and infrastructure. Ship transport is the main means of communication with the rest of the republic in summer. The district border Piy-Khemsky and Kyzylsky District to the southwest, Kaa-Khemsky District to south and southeast, Kuraginsky and Karatuzsky District of Krasnoyarsk Krai to the northwest and west, Nizhneudinsky District of Irkutsk Oblast to the northeast, Okinsky District of Republic of Buryatia in the east.

== See also ==
- Tozhu Tuvans
