= Chylgychy Ondar =

Russian politician (1955–2020)

- Чылгычы Ондар
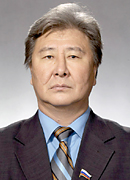

Member of the State Duma
- In office 14 October 2001 – 2 December 2007
- Succeeded by: Larisa Shoigu
- Constituency: Tuva

Personal details
- Born: 16 November 1955 Chadan, Dzun-Khemchiksky District, Tuvan AO, RSFSR, Soviet Union
- Died: 12 June 2020 (aged 64) Tuva, Russia

Chylgychy Chimit-Dorzhuyevich Ondar (Russian: Чылгычы Чимит-Доржуевич Ондар; 16 November 1955 – 12 June 2020) was a Russian politician of Tuvan ethnicity. From 2001 to 2007, Ondar was a member of the State Duma. He was a member of United Russia.

== Biography ==
Chylgychy Ondar was born in 1955 in Chadan, Tuva. In 1978 he graduated from the Shchukin Theatre Institute. Over the years, he worked as an instructor of the agitation and propaganda department of the Kyzyl City Committee of the CPSU, head of the information and sports department of the Tyvanyn anyiaktary newspaper, deputy minister of culture of the Tuvan ASSR, minister of culture, cinema and tourism of the Republic of Tuva, and its deputy prime minister for social policy.

In 2001 he was elected member of the 3rd State Duma from the Tuva constituency in a by-election. From 2009 he has been the first secretary of the Russian embassy in Kazakhstan. Ondar died on 12 June 2020, from COVID-19 in Moscow, aged 64.
