= Tere-Kholsky District =

Tere-Kholsky District Тере-Хольский кожуун (Russian)
- District

Other transcription(s)
  - Tuvan: Тере-Хөл кожуун
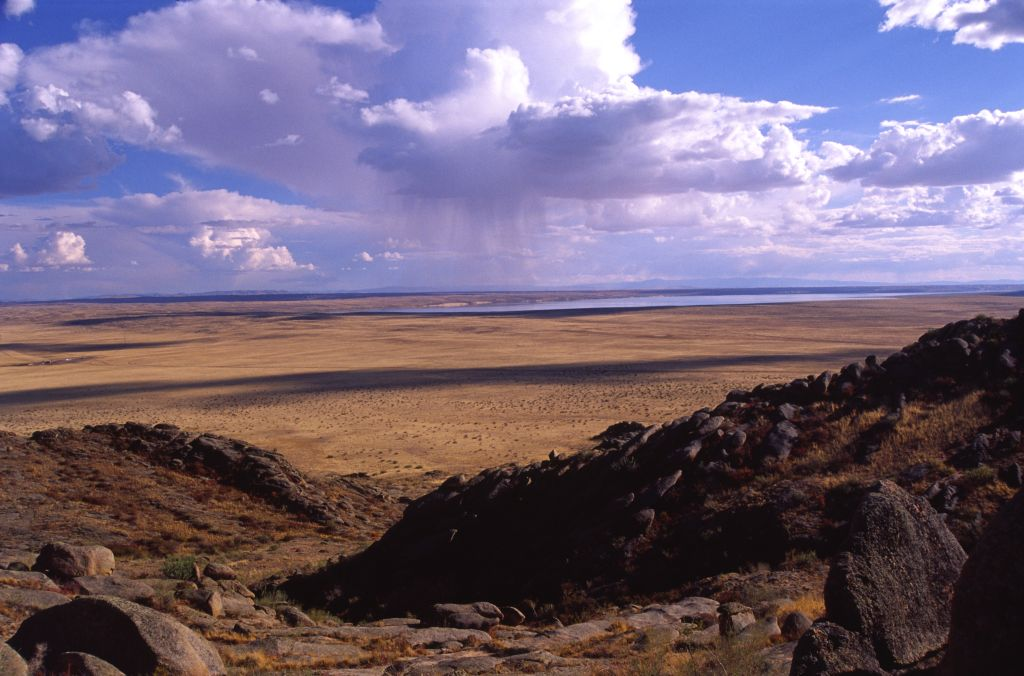

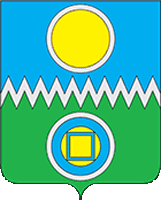
- Flag Coat of arms
- Location of Tere-Kholsky District in the Tuva Republic
- Coordinates: 50°32′N 97°29′E
- Country: Russia
- Federal subject: Tuva Republic
- Established: 2003
- Administrative center: Kungurtug

Area
  - Total: 10,050 km^{2} (3,880 sq mi)

Population (2010 Census)
  - Total: 1,882
  - Density: 0.1873/km^{2} (0.4850/sq mi)
  - Urban: 0%
  - Rural: 100%

Administrative structure
  - Administrative divisions: 4 sumon
  - Inhabited localities: 4 rural localities

Municipal structure
  - Municipally incorporated as: Tere-Kholsky Municipal District
  - Municipal divisions: 0 urban settlements, 4 rural settlements
- Time zone: UTC+7 (MSK+4)
- OKTMO ID: 93643000

Tere-Kholsky District (Russian: Тере-Хольский кожуун; Tuvan: Тере-Хөл кожуун, Tere-Xöl kojuun) is an administrative and municipal district (raion, or kozhuun), one of the seventeen in the Tuva Republic, Russia. It is located in the southeast of the republic. Its administrative center is the rural locality (a selo) of Kungurtug. Population: 1,882 (2010 census); 1,835 (2002 Census). The population of Kungurtug accounts for 77.9% of the district's total population.

== History ==
The district was established in 2003 when it was split from Kyzylsky District.
