= Khemchik =

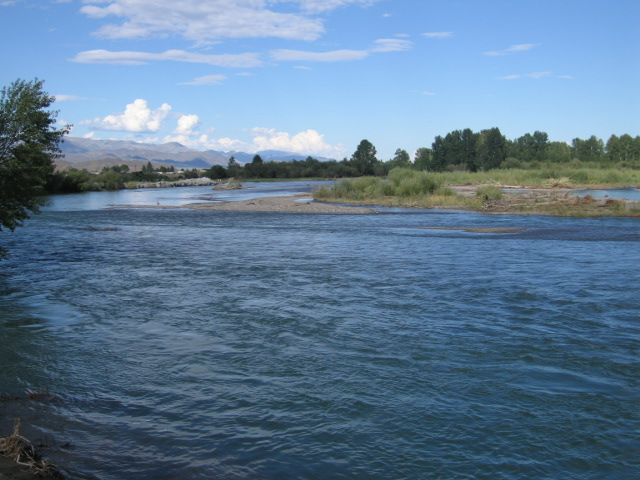
- The Khemchik near Kyzyl-Mazhalyk

Location
- Country: Russia

Physical characteristics
- Mouth: Yenisey
  - coordinates: 51.7353°N 92.1918°E
- Length: 320 km (200 mi)
- Basin size: 27,000 km^{2} (10,000 sq mi)

Basin features
- Progression: Yenisey→ Kara Sea

The Khemchik (Russian: Хемчик; Tuvan: Хемчик, Xemçik) is a river in Tuva in Russia, a left tributary of the Yenisey. The length of the river is 320 km, the area of its drainage basin is 27,000 km^{2}. The Khemchik freezes up in November and remains icebound until late April - early May. Its main tributaries are the Alash and Ak-Sug from the left, and the Barlyk and Chadan from the right. The town Ak-Dovurak is located in the valley of the Khemchik.

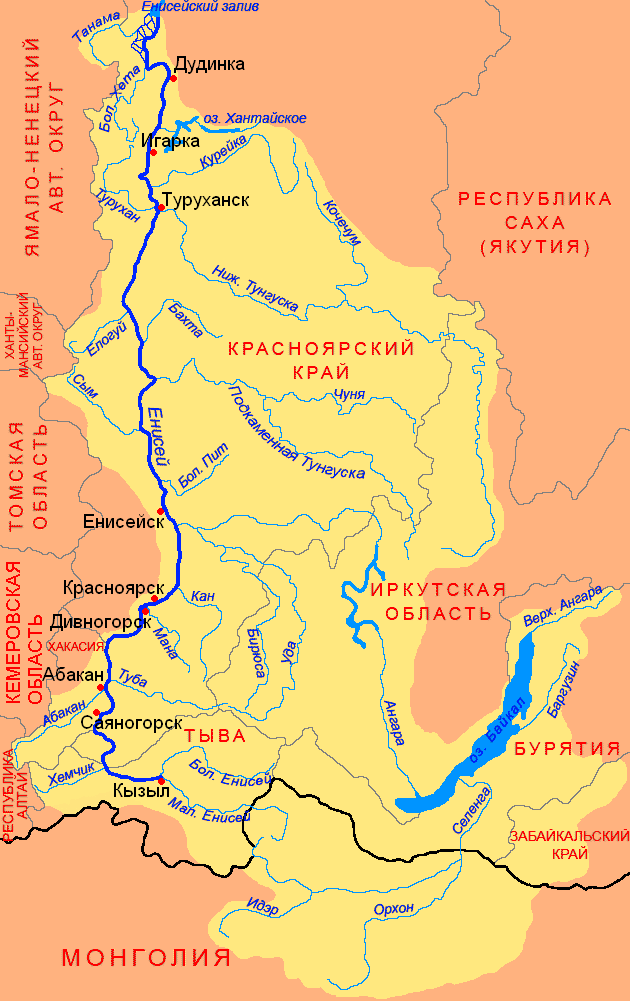
Basin of the Yenisey

== See also ==
- List of rivers of Russia
