= Barun-Khemchiksky District =

Barun-Khemchiksky District Барун-Хемчикский кожуун (Russian)
- District

Other transcription(s)
  - Tuvan: Барыын-Хемчик кожуун
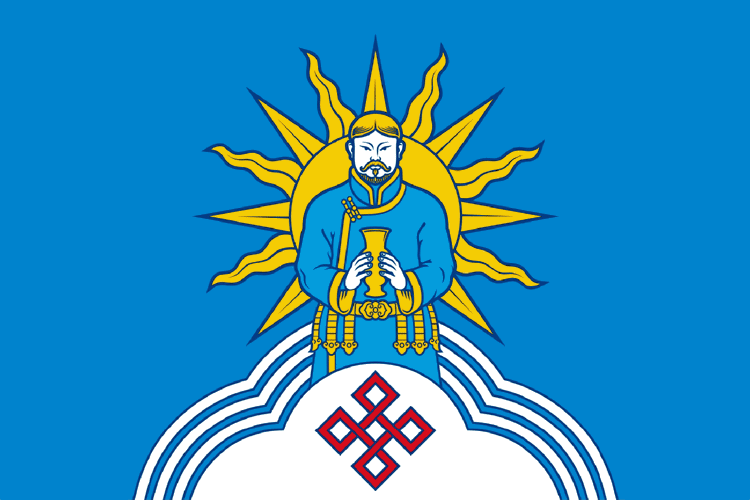
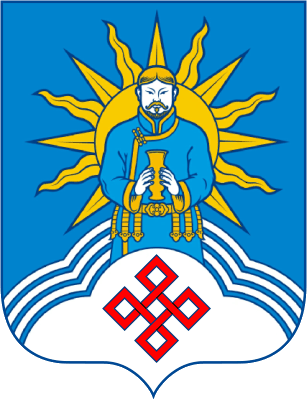
- Flag Coat of arms
- Location of Barun-Khemchiksky District in the Tuva Republic
- Coordinates: 51.169°N 89.272°E
- Country: Russia
- Federal subject: Tuva Republic
- Administrative center: Kyzyl-Mazhalyk

Area
  - Total: 6,290 km^{2} (2,430 sq mi)

Population (2010 Census)
  - Total: 12,847
  - Density: 2.04/km^{2} (5.29/sq mi)
  - Urban: 0%
  - Rural: 100%

Administrative structure
  - Administrative divisions: 9 sumon
  - Inhabited localities: 9 rural localities

Municipal structure
  - Municipally incorporated as: Barun-Khemchiksky Municipal District
  - Municipal divisions: 0 urban settlements, 9 rural settlements
- Time zone: UTC+7 (MSK+4)
- OKTMO ID: 93610000
- Website: http://gov.tuva.ru/region/msu/766/

Barun-Khemchiksky District (Russian: Бару́н-Хемчи́кский кожуун; Tuvan: Барыын-Хемчик кожуун, Barıın-Xemçik kojuun) is an administrative and municipal district (raion, or kozhuun), one of the seventeen in the Tuva Republic, Russia. It is located in the west of the republic. The area of the district is 6,290 square kilometers (2,430 sq mi). Its administrative center is the rural locality (a selo) of Kyzyl-Mazhalyk. Population: 12,847 (2010 census); 12,683 (2002 Census); 31,421 (1989 Soviet census). The population of Kyzyl-Mazhalyk accounts for 39.5% of the district's total population.
