= Saryg-Sep =

Saryg-Sep Сарыг-Сеп
- Selo

Other transcription(s)
  - Tuvan: Сарыг-Сеп
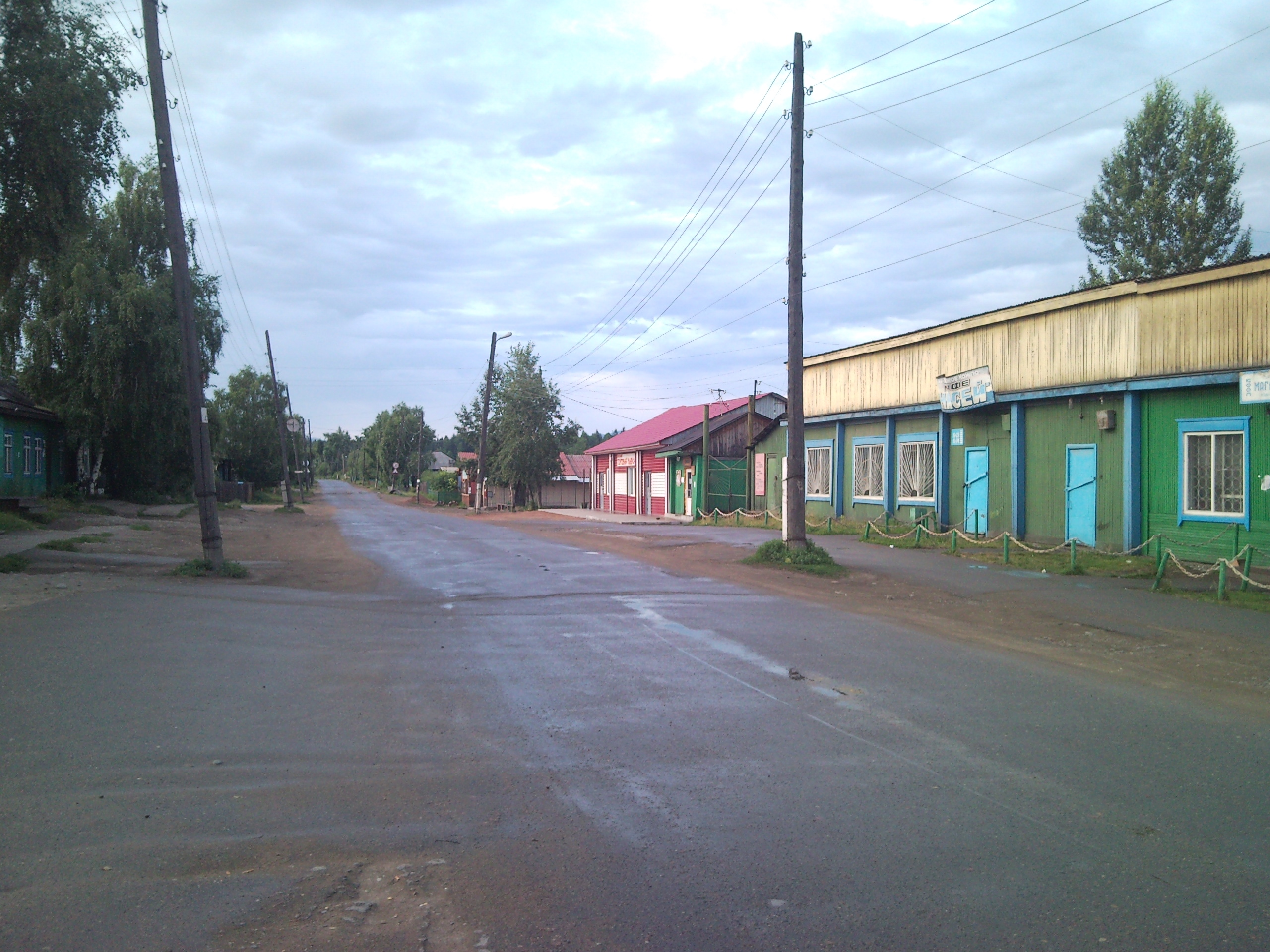

- Flag
- Interactive map of Saryg-Sep
- Location of Saryg-Sep Saryg-Sep (Tuva Republic)
- Coordinates: 51°29′22″N 95°33′19″E
- Country: Russia
- Federal subject: Tuva
- Administrative district: Kaa-Khemsky District
- SumonSelsoviet: Saryg-Sepsky
- Founded: 1904

Population (2010 Census)
  - Total: 4,417
  - Estimate (2021): 4,174 (−5.5%)

Administrative status
  - Capital of: Kaa-Khemsky District, Saryg-Sepsky Sumon

Municipal status
  - Municipal district: Kaa-Khemsky Municipal District
  - Rural settlement: Saryg-Sepsky Sumon Rural Settlement
  - Capital of: Kaa-Khemsky Municipal District, Saryg-Sepsky Sumon Rural Settlement
- Time zone: UTC+7 (MSK+4)
- Postal code: 668400
- OKTMO ID: 93620420101

Saryg-Sep (Russian: Сарыг-Сеп; Tuvan: Сарыг-Сеп, romanized: Sarıg-Sep) is a rural locality (a selo) and the administrative center of Kaa-Khemsky District of Tuva, Russia. Population: 4,417 (2010 census); 4,621 (2002 census); 4,663 (1989 Soviet census).
