= Sut-Kholsky District =

Sut-Kholsky District Сут-Хольский кожуун (Russian)
- District

Other transcription(s)
  - Tuvan: Сүт-Хөл кожуун
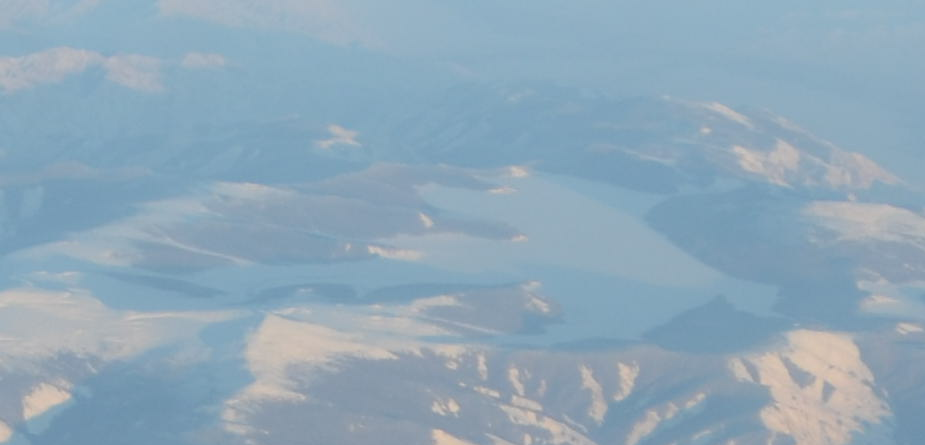

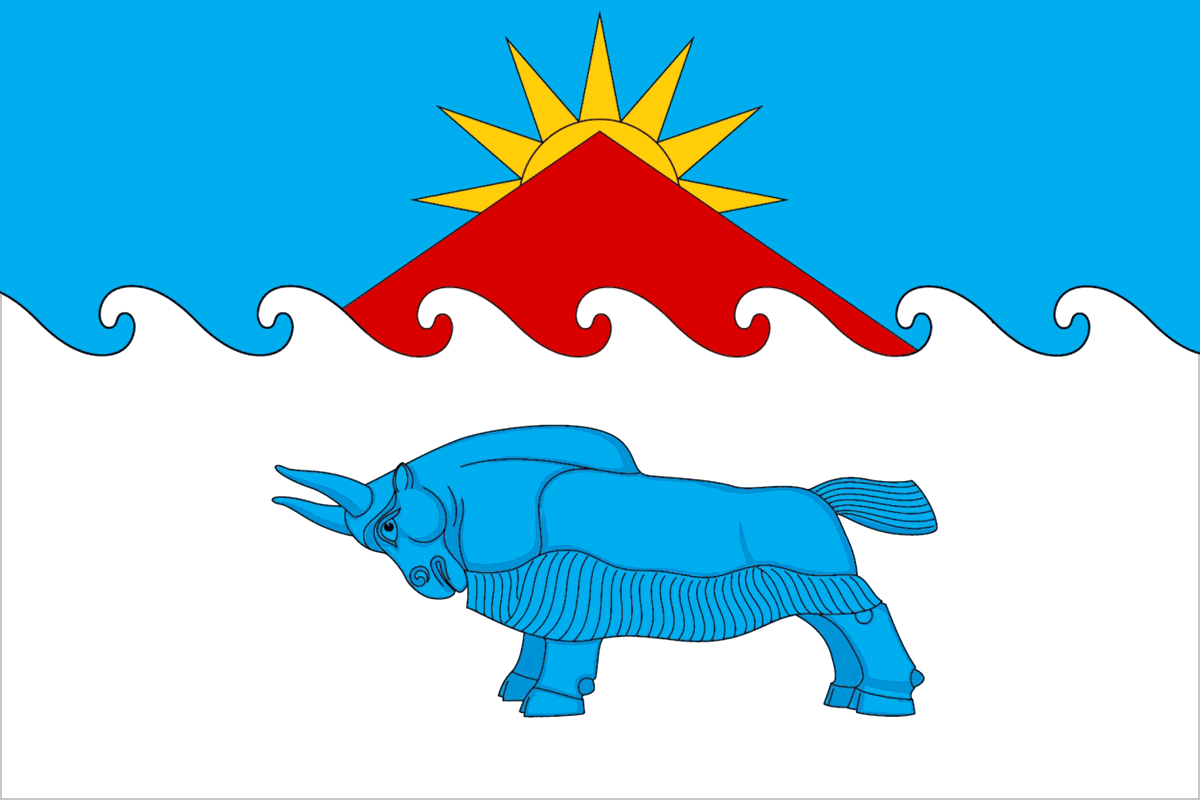
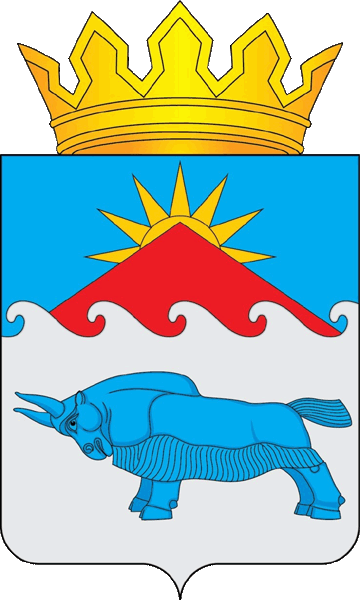
- Flag Coat of arms
- Location of Sut-Kholsky District in the Tuva Republic
- Coordinates: 51.638°N 91.046°E
- Country: Russia
- Federal subject: Tuva Republic
- Established: 1941
- Administrative center: Sug-Aksy

Area
  - Total: 6,691.25 km^{2} (2,583.51 sq mi)

Population (2010 Census)
  - Total: 8,029
  - Density: 1.200/km^{2} (3.108/sq mi)
  - Urban: 0%
  - Rural: 100%

Administrative structure
  - Administrative divisions: 7 sumon
  - Inhabited localities: 7 rural localities

Municipal structure
  - Municipally incorporated as: Sut-Kholsky Municipal District
  - Municipal divisions: 0 urban settlements, 7 rural settlements
- Time zone: UTC+7 (MSK+4)
- OKTMO ID: 93638000
- Website: http://suthol.tuva24.ru/

Sut-Kholsky District (Russian: Сут-Хо́льский кожуун; Tuvan: Сүт-Хөл кожуун, Süt-Xöl kojuun) is an administrative and municipal district (raion, or kozhuun), one of the seventeen in the Tuva Republic, Russia. It is located in the west of the republic. The area of the district is 6,691.25 square kilometers (2,583.51 sq mi). Its administrative center is the rural locality (a selo) of Sug-Aksy. Population: 8,029 (2010 census); 8,430 (2002 Census); 12,038 (1989 Soviet census). The population of Sug-Aksy accounts for 39.7% of the district's total population.
