= Shagonar =

Town in the Tuva Republic, Russia

Shagonar Шагонар
- Town

Other transcription(s)
  - Tuvan: Шагаан-Арыг
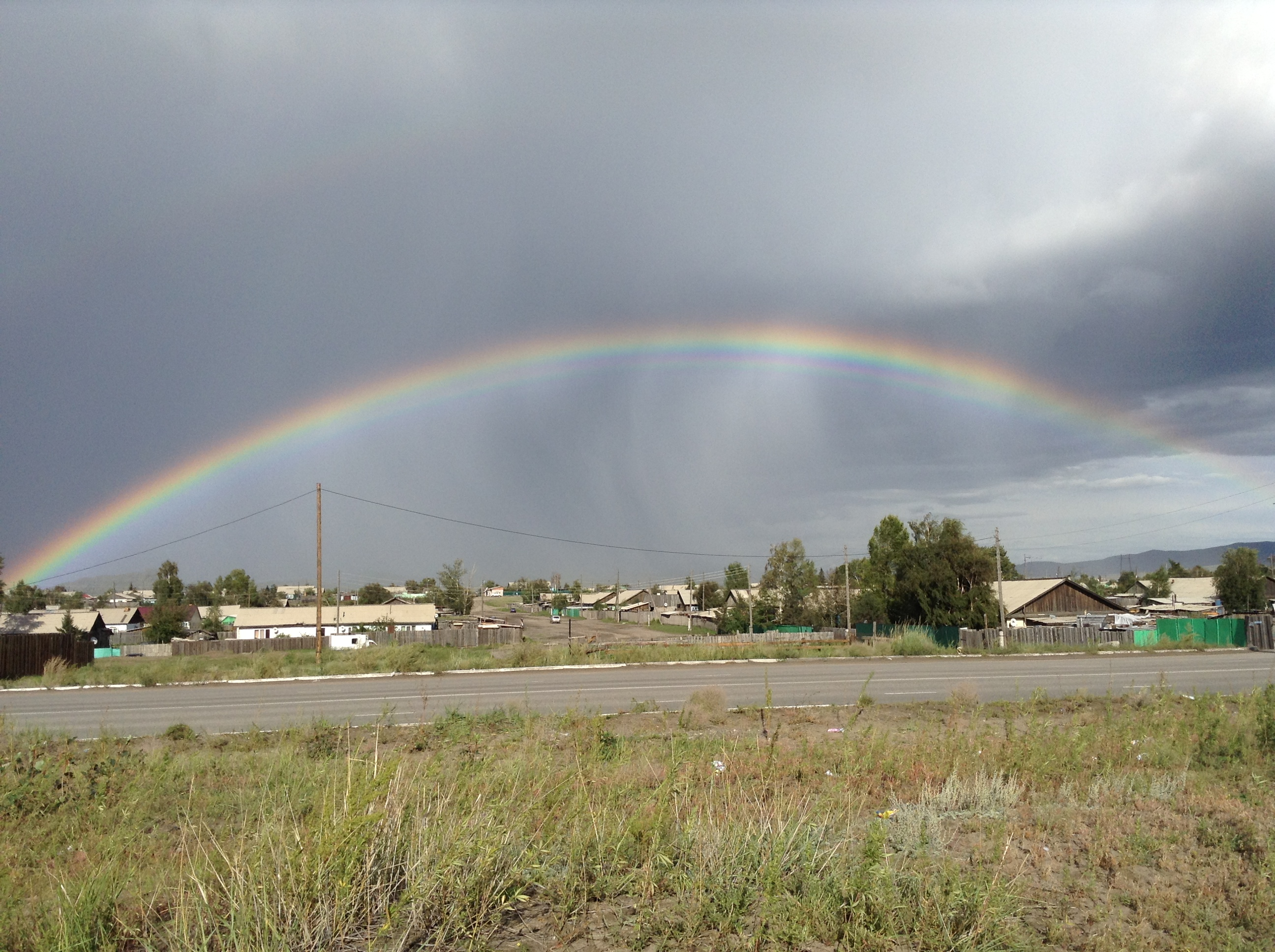
- View of Shagonar
- Interactive map of Shagonar
- Location of Shagonar Shagonar (Tuva Republic)
- Coordinates: 51°33′N 92°46′E
- Country: Russia
- Federal subject: Tuva
- Administrative district: Ulug-Khemsky District
- Town under district jurisdictionSelsoviet: Shagonar
- Known since: 1888
- Town status since: 1945
- Elevation: 560 m (1,840 ft)

Population (2010 Census)
  - Total: 10,956
  - Estimate (2021): 11,772 (+7.4%)

Administrative status
  - Capital of: Ulug-Khemsky District, Shagonar Town Under District Jurisdiction

Municipal status
  - Municipal district: Ulug-Khemsky Municipal District
  - Urban settlement: Shagonar Urban Settlement
  - Capital of: Ulug-Khemsky Municipal District, Shagonar Urban Settlement
- Time zone: UTC+7 (MSK+4)
- Postal codes: 668210, 668218
- OKTMO ID: 93654101001

Shagonar population
- 2010 Census: 10,956
- 2002 Census: 11,008
- 1989 Census: 10,084
- 1979 Census: 5,455

Shagonar (Russian: Шагона́р; Tuvan: Шагаан-Арыг, romanized: Şagân-Arıg) is a town and the administrative center of Ulug-Khemsky District in the Tuva Republic, Russia, located on the left bank of the Yenisei River, 124 kilometers (77 mi) west of Kyzyl, the capital of the republic. As of the 2010 Census, its population was 10,956.

== History ==
It had been known since 1888. Town status was granted to it in 1945. The original town of Shagonar was engulfed by water in the 1970s due to the construction of the Sayano-Shushenskaya Dam. It was rebuilt 7 kilometers (4.3 mi) from the original location.

== Administrative and municipal status ==
Within the framework of administrative divisions, Shagonar serves as the administrative center of Ulug-Khemsky District. As an administrative division, it is incorporated within Ulug-Khemsky District as Shagonar Town Under District Jurisdiction. As a municipal division, Shagonar Town Under District Jurisdiction is incorporated within Ulug-Khemsky Municipal District as Shagonar Urban Settlement.
