= Toora-Khem =

Toora-Khem Тоора-Хем
- Selo

Other transcription(s)
  - Tuvan: Доора-Хем
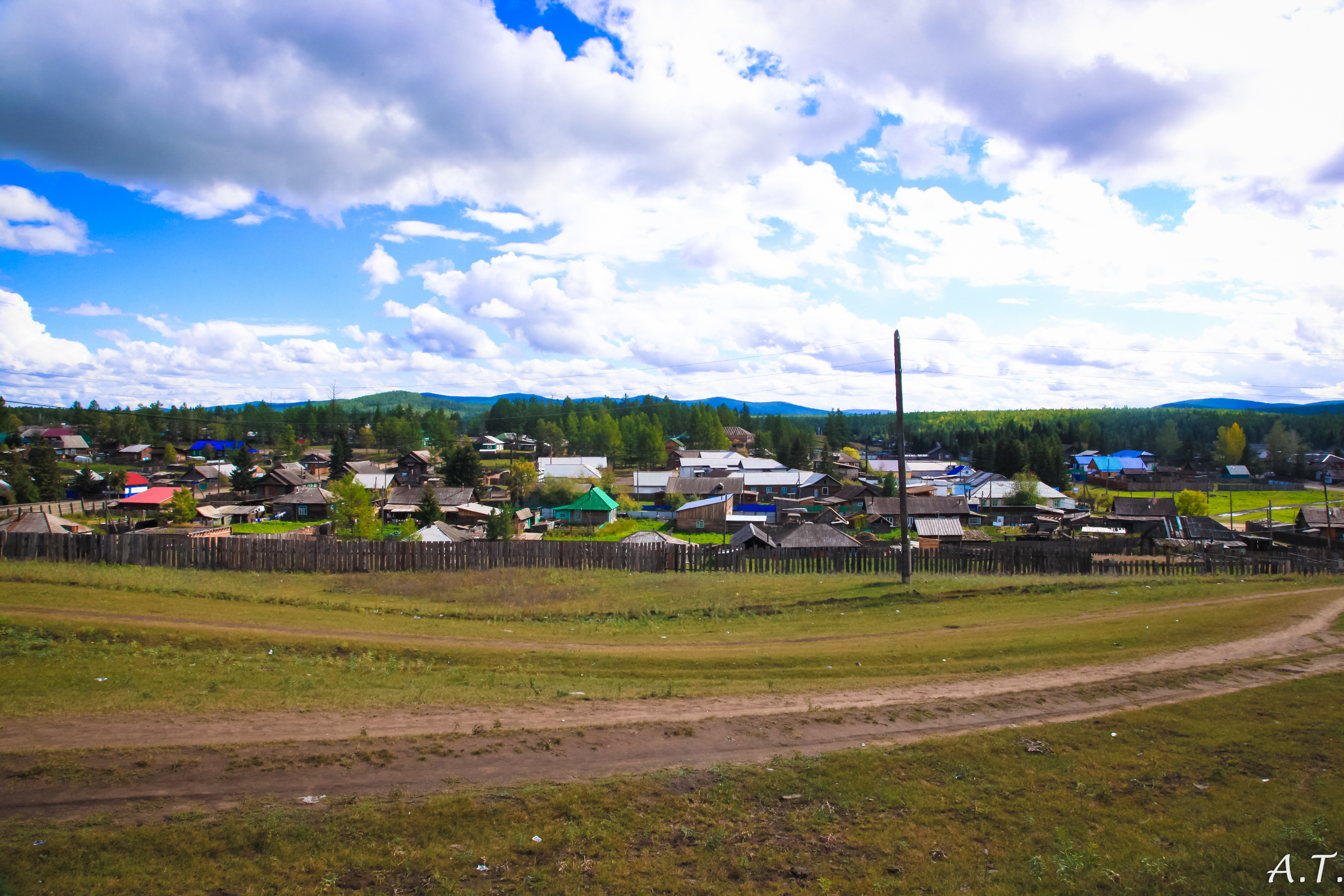

- Flag
- Interactive map of Toora-Khem
- Location of Toora-Khem Toora-Khem (Tuva Republic)
- Coordinates: 52°27′56″N 96°06′52″E
- Country: Russia
- Federal subject: Tuva
- Administrative district: Todzhinsky District
- SumonSelsoviet: Toora-Khemsky

Population (2010 Census)
  - Total: 2,387
  - Estimate (2021): 3,264 (+36.7%)

Administrative status
  - Capital of: Todzhinsky District, Toora-Khemsky Sumon

Municipal status
  - Municipal district: Todzhinsky Municipal District
  - Rural settlement: Toora-Khemsky Sumon Rural Settlement
  - Capital of: Todzhinsky Municipal District, Toora-Khemsky Sumon Rural Settlement
- Time zone: UTC+7 (MSK+4)
- Postal code: 668530
- OKTMO ID: 93650444101

Toora-Khem (Russian: Тоора-Хем; Tuvan: Доора-Хем, romanized: Doora-Xem) is a rural locality (a selo) and the administrative center of Todzhinsky District of Tuva, Russia. Population: 2,387 (2010 census); 2,233 (2002 census); 1,851 (1989 Soviet census).

== Climate ==
Due to high elevation, Toora-Khem has a subarctic climate (Köppen climate classification Dwc) with bitterly cold, long winters and mild, damp summers.

Climate data for Toora-Khem
Month	Jan	Feb	Mar	Apr	May	Jun	Jul	Aug	Sep	Oct	Nov	Dec	Year
Record high °C (°F)	−0.7 (30.7)	5.7 (42.3)	17.7 (63.9)	29.1 (84.4)	33.6 (92.5)	35.5 (95.9)	37.3 (99.1)	36.9 (98.4)	31.8 (89.2)	22.7 (72.9)	12.2 (54.0)	0.4 (32.7)	37.3 (99.1)
Mean daily maximum °C (°F)	−17.2 (1.0)	−8.7 (16.3)	1.3 (34.3)	10.3 (50.5)	17.2 (63.0)	23.2 (73.8)	24.7 (76.5)	21.9 (71.4)	15.0 (59.0)	5.8 (42.4)	−6.2 (20.8)	−16.1 (3.0)	5.9 (42.7)
Daily mean °C (°F)	−26.1 (−15.0)	−19.9 (−3.8)	−8.9 (16.0)	1.2 (34.2)	7.6 (45.7)	13.8 (56.8)	16.3 (61.3)	13.1 (55.6)	5.9 (42.6)	−2.2 (28.0)	−13.1 (8.4)	−23.3 (−9.9)	−3.0 (26.7)
Mean daily minimum °C (°F)	−32.5 (−26.5)	−28.4 (−19.1)	−18.1 (−0.6)	−6.5 (20.3)	−1.2 (29.8)	5.1 (41.2)	8.9 (48.0)	6.1 (43.0)	−0.8 (30.6)	−8.3 (17.1)	−18.9 (−2.0)	−29.1 (−20.4)	−10.3 (13.4)
Record low °C (°F)	−56.1 (−69.0)	−53.2 (−63.8)	−46.3 (−51.3)	−37.6 (−35.7)	−19.9 (−3.8)	−11.2 (11.8)	−4.2 (24.4)	−7.4 (18.7)	−17.7 (0.1)	−36.0 (−32.8)	−48.3 (−54.9)	−53.7 (−64.7)	−56.1 (−69.0)
Average precipitation mm (inches)	10.4 (0.41)	5.6 (0.22)	6.3 (0.25)	13.9 (0.55)	30.0 (1.18)	52.9 (2.08)	71.5 (2.81)	70.4 (2.77)	37.9 (1.49)	14.7 (0.58)	13.3 (0.52)	12.9 (0.51)	339.8 (13.37)
Source: Pogoda.ru.net
