= Kaa-Khem =

Kaa-Khem Каа-Хем
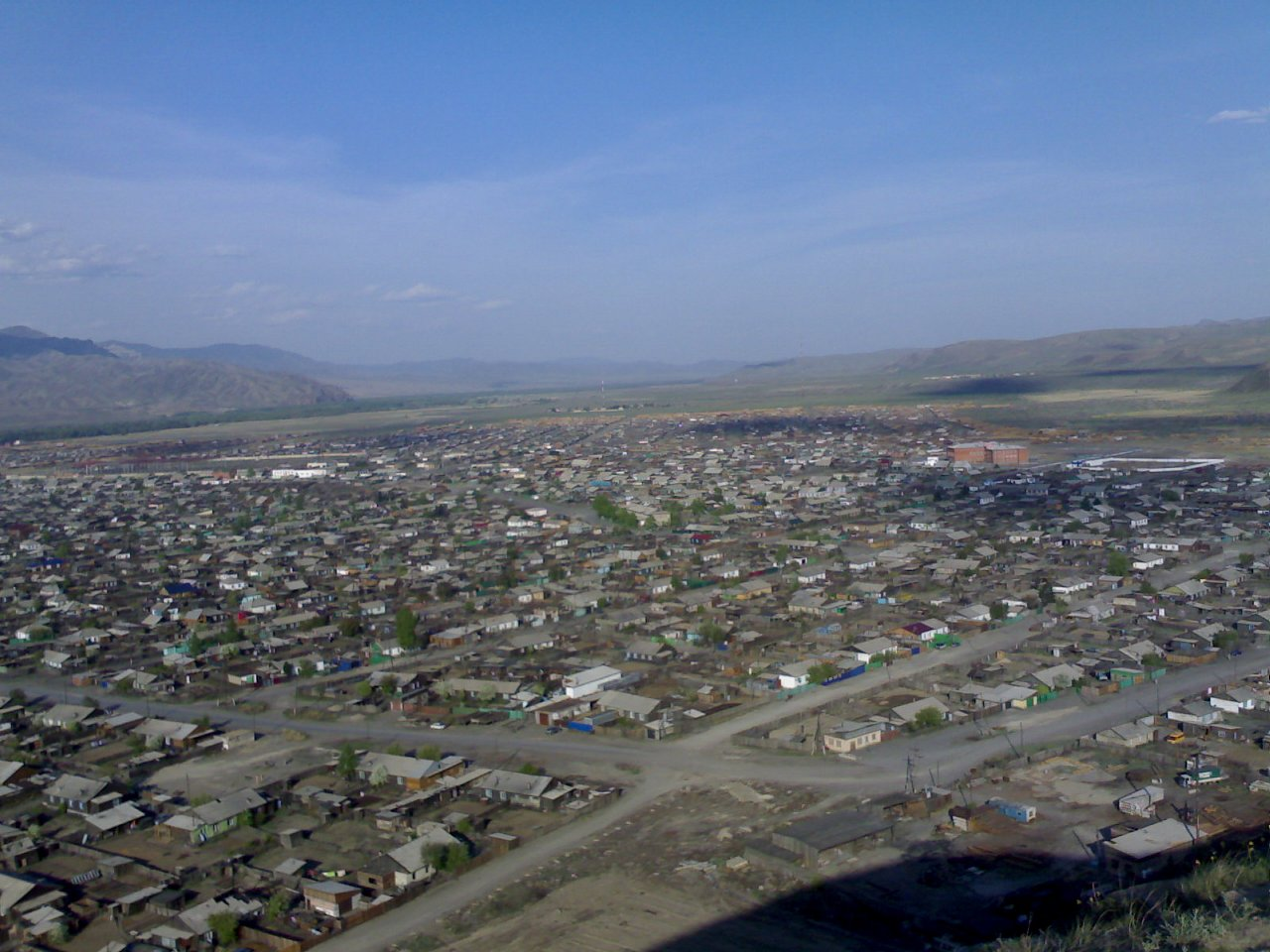

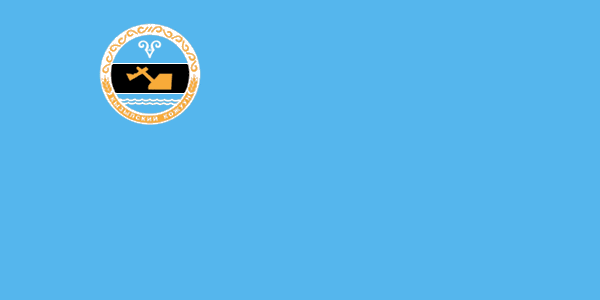
- Flag
- Interactive map of Kaa-Khem
- Location of Kaa-Khem Kaa-Khem (Tuva Republic)
- Coordinates: 51°42′N 94°33′E
- Country: Russia
- Federal subject: Tuva
- Administrative district: Kyzylsky District
- urban localitySelsoviet: Kaa-Khem
- Founded: 1975

Population (2010 Census)
  - Total: 15,044
  - Estimate (2021): 19,686 (+30.9%)
- Time zone: UTC+7 (MSK+4)
- Postal code: 6667901
- Dialing code: +7 39422
- OKTMO ID: 93622151051

Kaa-Khem (Tuvan: Каа-Хем, Kaa-Xem) is an urban locality (an urban-type settlement) in the Tuva Republic, Russia. It is the administrative center of Kyzylsky District. As of the 2010 census, the locality had a population of 15,044. The town was founded in 1975 with the opening of an industrial plant.
