= Bay-Tayginsky District =

Bay-Tayginsky District Бай-Тайгинский кожуун (Russian)
- District

Other transcription(s)
  - Tuvan: Бай-Тайга кожуун
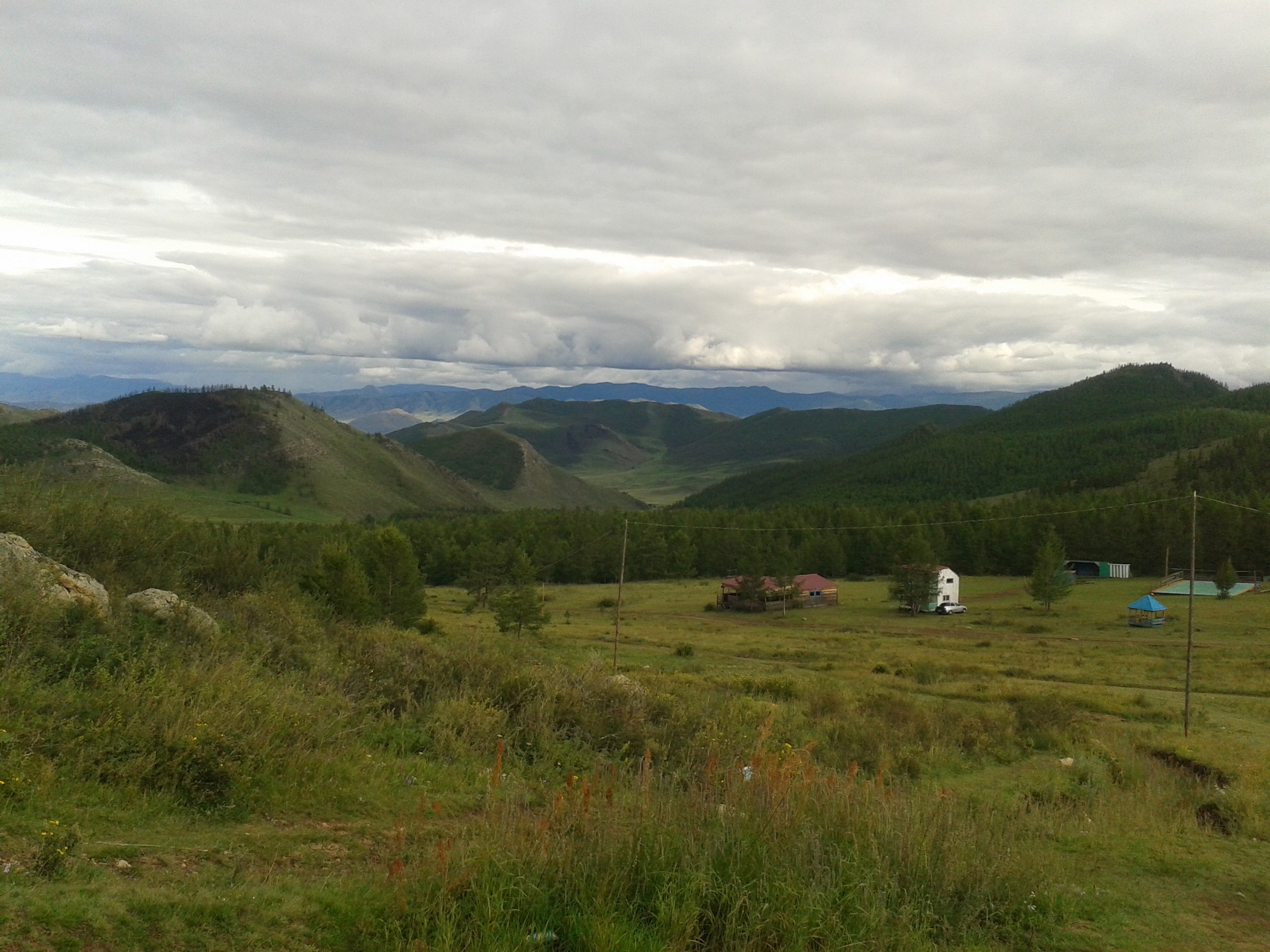
- Sivilig, Bay-Tayginsky District

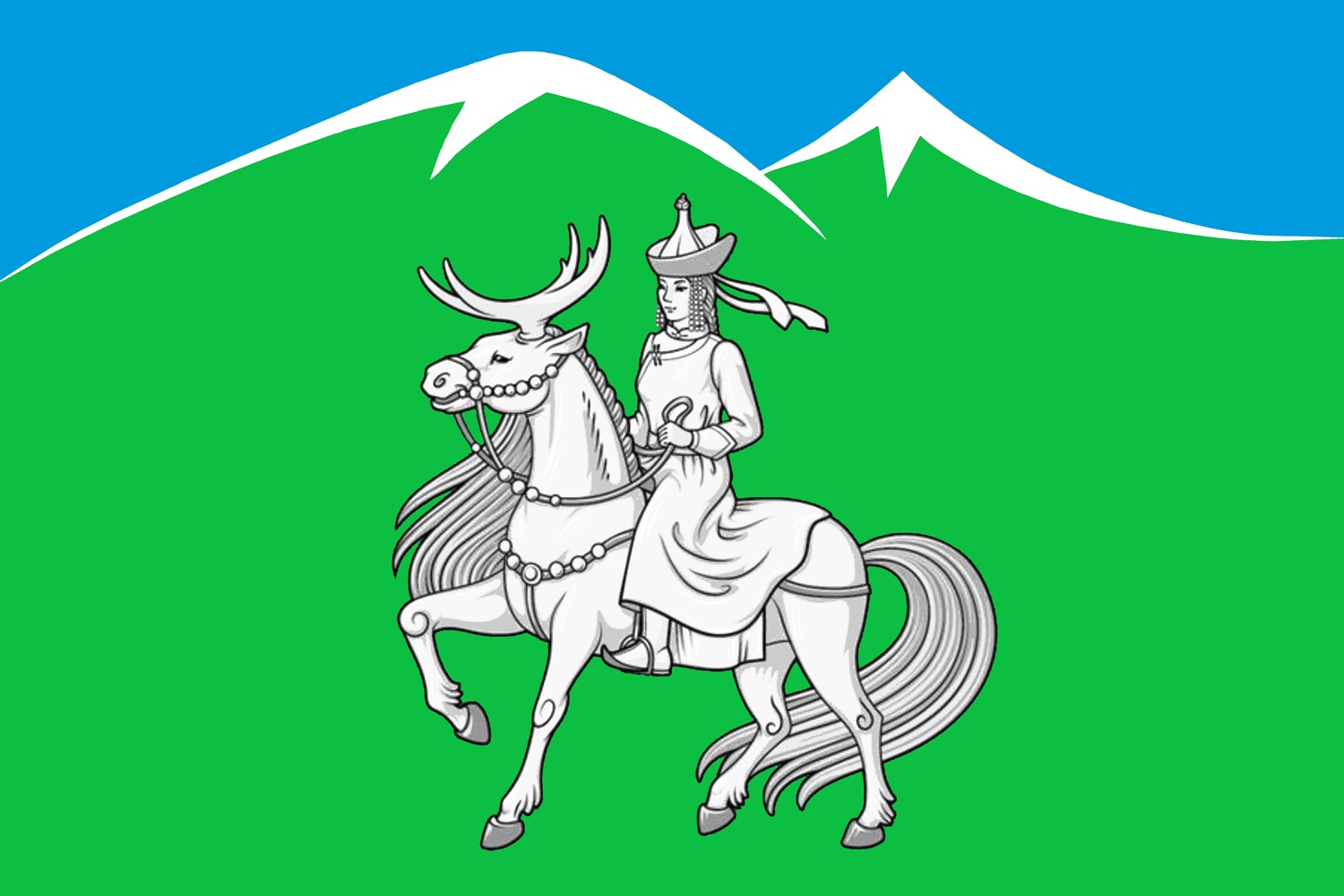
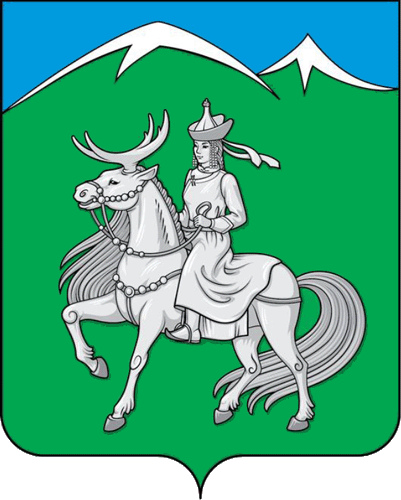
- Flag Coat of arms
- Location of Bay-Tayginsky District in the Tuva Republic
- Coordinates: 51°00′45″N 90°12′22″E
- Country: Russia
- Federal subject: Tuva Republic
- Administrative center: Teeli

Area
  - Total: 7,922.82 km^{2} (3,059.02 sq mi)

Population (2010 Census)
  - Total: 10,803
  - Density: 1.3635/km^{2} (3.5315/sq mi)
  - Urban: 0%
  - Rural: 100%

Administrative structure
  - Administrative divisions: 7 sumon
  - Inhabited localities: 8 rural localities

Municipal structure
  - Municipally incorporated as: Bay-Tayginsky Municipal District
  - Municipal divisions: 0 urban settlements, 7 rural settlements
- Time zone: UTC+7 (MSK+4)
- OKTMO ID: 93605000
- Website: http://gov.tuva.ru/region/msu/765/

Bay-Tayginsky District (Russian: Бай-Тайгинский кожуун; Tuvan: Бай-Тайга кожуун, Bay-Tayga kojuun) is an administrative and municipal district (raion, or kozhuun), one of the seventeen in the Tuva Republic, Russia. It is located in the west of the republic. The area of the district is 7,922.82 square kilometers (3,059.02 sq mi). Its administrative center is the rural locality (a selo) of Teeli. Population: 10,803 (2010 census); 12,321 (2002 Census); 13,401 (1989 Soviet census). The population of Teeli accounts for 31.4% of the district's total population.

When the 2011 Tuvan Bandy Championships was played, Bay-Tayginsky District was the winner.
