= Ovyursky District =

Ovyursky District Овюрский кожуун (Russian)
- District

Other transcription(s)
  - Tuvan: Өвүр кожуун
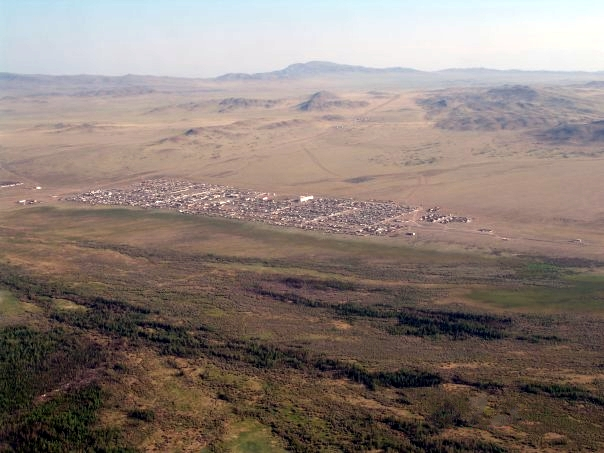
- Khandagaity in Ovyursky District

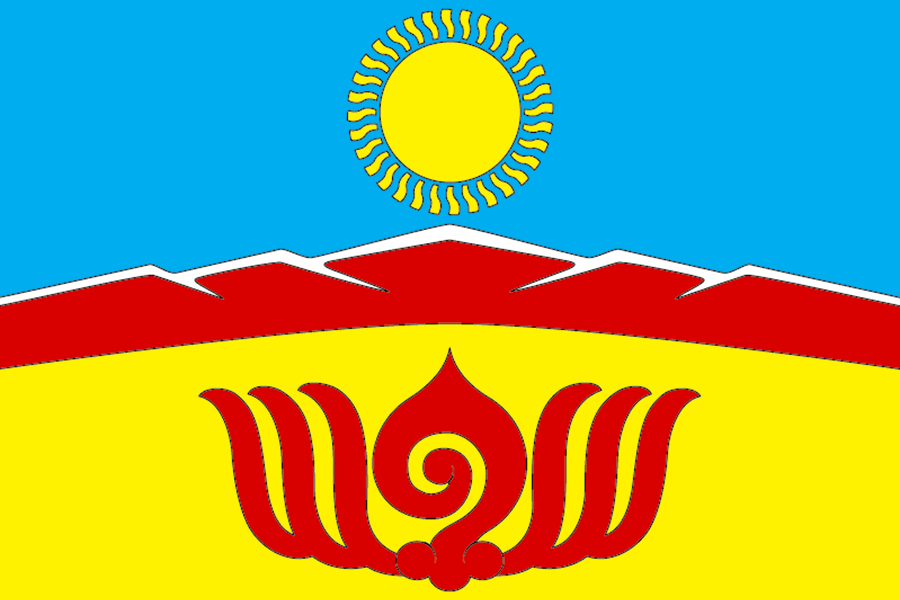
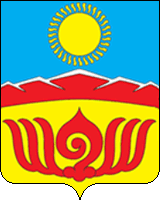
- Flag Coat of arms
- Location of Ovyursky District in the Tuva Republic
- Coordinates: 50.710°N 90.901°E
- Country: Russia
- Federal subject: Tuva Republic
- Established: 12 March 1941
- Administrative center: Khandagayty

Area
  - Total: 4,400 km^{2} (1,700 sq mi)

Population (2010 Census)
  - Total: 7,022
  - Density: 1.6/km^{2} (4.1/sq mi)
  - Urban: 0%
  - Rural: 100%

Administrative structure
  - Administrative divisions: 6 sumon
  - Inhabited localities: 6 rural localities

Municipal structure
  - Municipally incorporated as: Ovyursky Municipal District
  - Municipal divisions: 0 urban settlements, 6 rural settlements
- Time zone: UTC+7 (MSK+4)
- OKTMO ID: 93630000
- Website: http://ovur.tuva.ru/

Ovyursky District (Russian: Овюрский кожуун; Tuvan: Өвүр кожуун, Övür kojuun) is an administrative and municipal district (raion, or kozhuun), one of the seventeen in the Tuva Republic, Russia. It is located in the southwest of the republic. The area of the district is 4,400 square kilometers (1,700 sq mi). Its administrative center is the rural locality (a selo) of Khandagayty. Population: 7,022 (2010 census); 7,930 (2002 Census); 8,868 (1989 Soviet census). The population of Khandagayty accounts for 45.7% of the district's total population.
