= Chedi-Kholsky District =

Chedi-Kholsky District Чеди-Хольский кожуун (Russian)
- District

Other transcription(s)
  - Tuvan: Чеди-Хөл кожуун
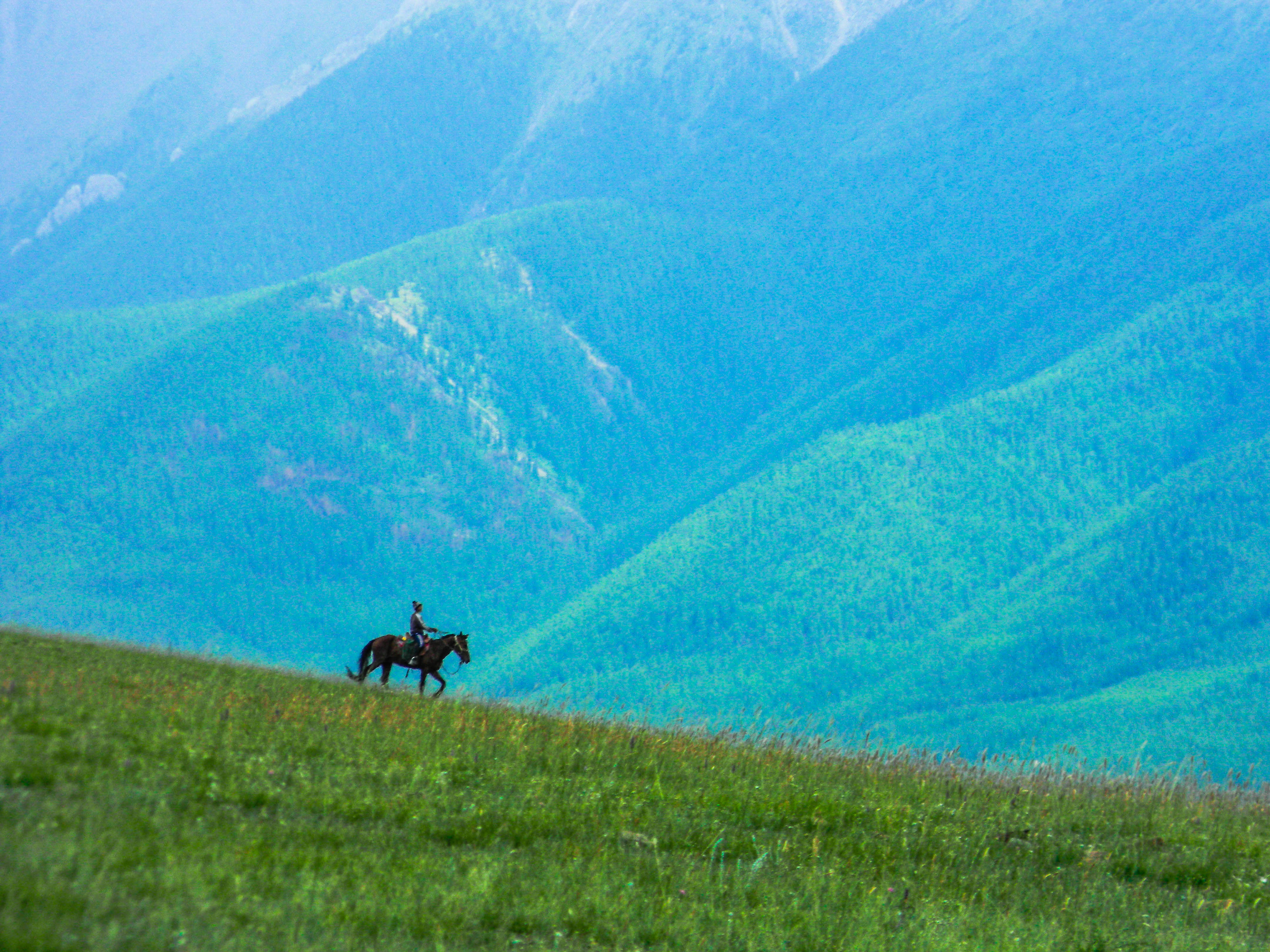
- Landscape in Chedi-Kholsky District

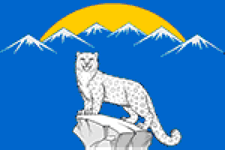
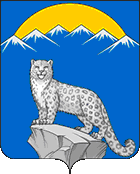
- Flag Coat of arms
- Location of Chedi-Kholsky District in the Tuva Republic
- Coordinates: 51.211°N 93.191°E
- Country: Russia
- Federal subject: Tuva Republic
- Established: 1993
- Administrative center: Khovu-Aksy

Area
  - Total: 3,707 km^{2} (1,431 sq mi)

Population (2010 Census)
  - Total: 7,685
  - Density: 2.073/km^{2} (5.369/sq mi)
  - Urban: 0%
  - Rural: 100%

Administrative structure
  - Administrative divisions: 6 sumon
  - Inhabited localities: 7 rural localities

Municipal structure
  - Municipally incorporated as: Chedi-Kholsky Municipal District
  - Municipal divisions: 0 urban settlements, 6 rural settlements
- Time zone: UTC+7 (MSK+4)
- OKTMO ID: 93657000
- Website: http://7holkojuun.ru/

Chedi-Kholsky District (Russian: Чеди-Хольский кожуун; Tuvan: Чеди-Хөл кожуун, Çedi-Xöl kojuun) is an administrative and municipal district (raion, or kozhuun) which is one of the seventeen in the Tuva Republic, Russia. It is located in the center of the republic. The area of the district is 3,707 square kilometers (1,431 sq mi). Its administrative center is the rural locality (a selo) of Khovu-Aksy. Population: 7,685 (2010 census); 8,081 (2002 Census). The population of Khovu-Aksy accounts for 47.8% of the district's total population.

== History ==
Chaa-Kholsky District was established in 1993.
