= Ak-Dovurak =

Town in the Tuva Republic, Russia

Ak-Dovurak Ак-Довурак
- Town
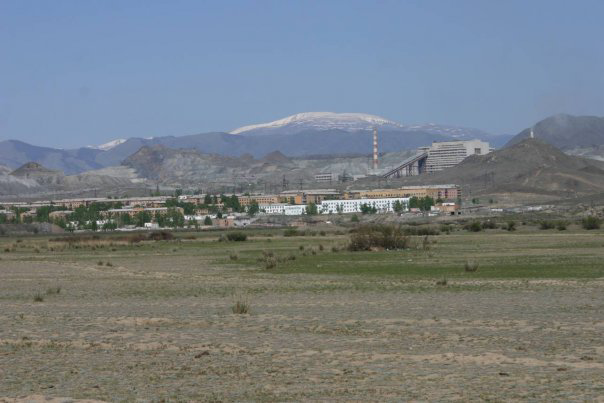

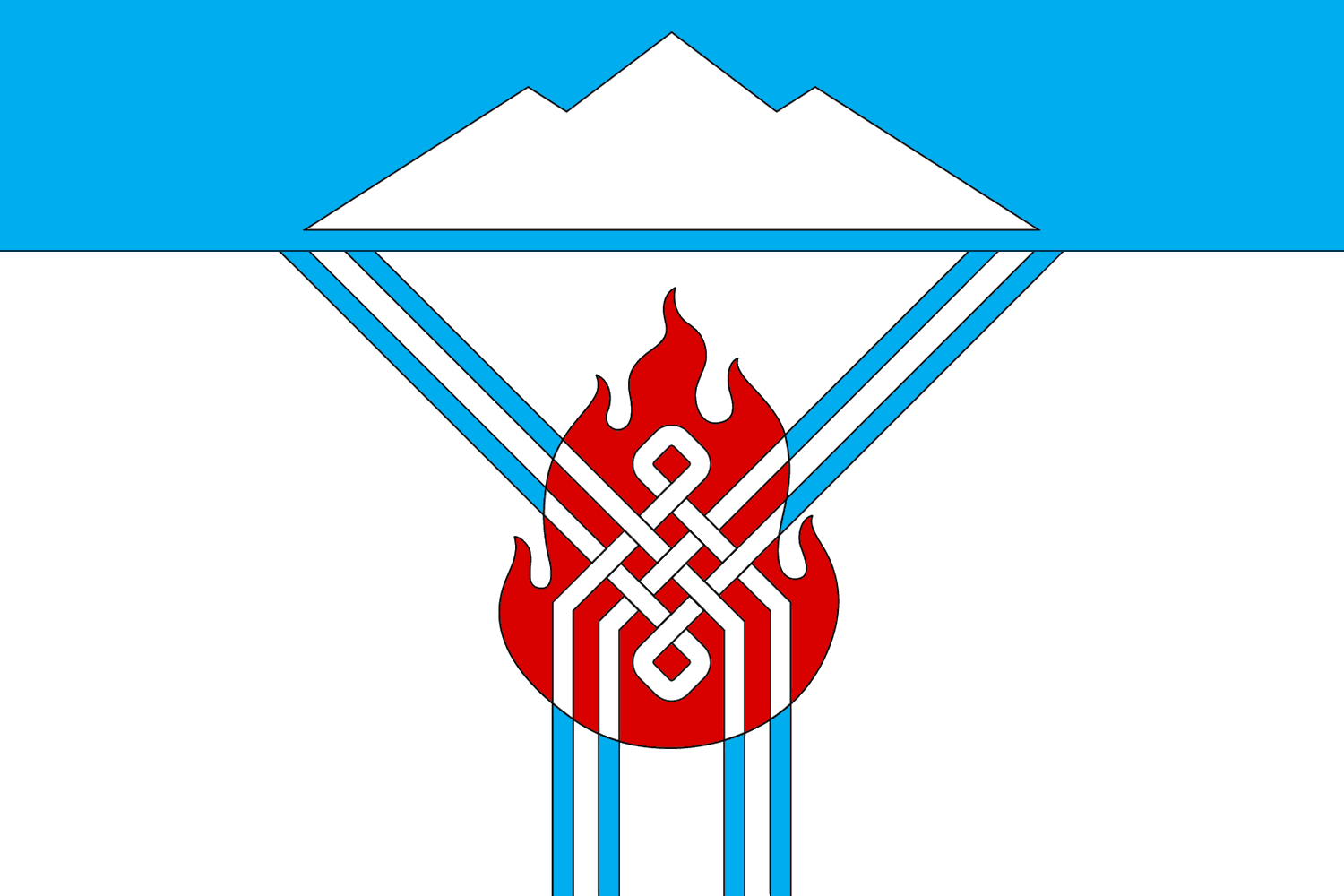
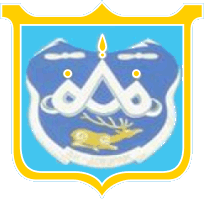
- Flag Coat of arms
- Interactive map of Ak-Dovurak
- Location of Ak-Dovurak Ak-Dovurak (Tuva Republic)
- Coordinates: 51°11′N 90°36′E
- Country: Russia
- Federal subject: Tuva
- Founded: 1964
- Elevation: 850 m (2,790 ft)

Population (2010 Census)
  - Total: 13,468
  - Estimate (2021): 12,456 (−7.5%)

Administrative status
  - Subordinated to: town under republic jurisdiction (urban okrug) of Ak-Dovurak
  - Capital of: town under republic jurisdiction (urban okrug) of Ak-Dovurak

Municipal status
  - Urban okrug: Ak-Dovurak Urban Okrug
  - Capital of: Ak-Dovurak Urban Okrug
- Time zone: UTC+7 (MSK+4)
- Postal code: 668051
- OKTMO ID: 93703000001

Ak-Dovurak (Tuvan: Ак-Довурак) is a town in the Tuva Republic, Russia, located on the Khemchik River (left tributary of the Yenisei), 301 kilometers (187 mi) west of Kyzyl. The population is 13,468 (2010 census); 12,965 (2002 census); 15,191 (1989 Soviet census).

== History ==
It was founded in 1964 as a town housing the workers employed in construction of an asbestos plant.

== Administrative and municipal status ==
Within the framework of administrative divisions, it is incorporated as the town under republic jurisdiction (urban okrug) of Ak-Dovurak—an administrative unit with the status equal to that of the districts (kozhuuns). As a municipal division, the town under republic jurisdiction (urban okrug) of Ak-Dovurak is incorporated as Ak-Dovurak Urban Okrug.
