= Kaa-Khemsky District =

Kaa-Khemsky District Каа-Хемский кожуун (Russian)
- District

Other transcription(s)
  - Tuvan: Каа-Хем кожуун
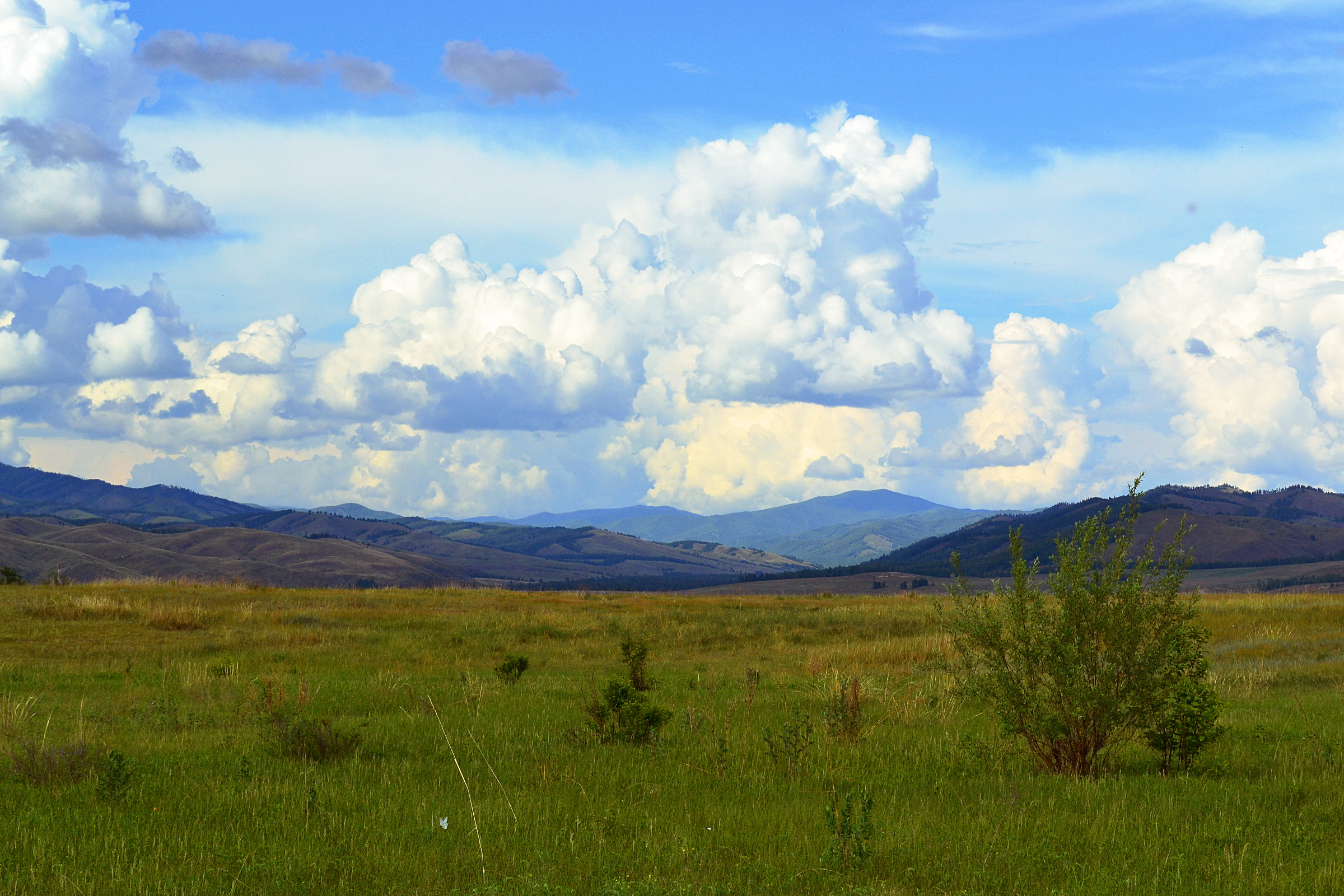
- Landscape in Kaa-Khemsky District

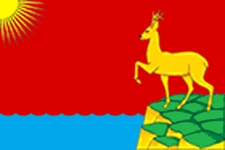
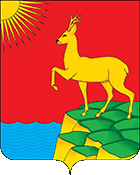
- Flag Coat of arms
- Location of Kaa-Khemsky District in the Tuva Republic
- Coordinates: 51.269°N 96.554°E
- Country: Russia
- Federal subject: Tuva Republic
- Administrative center: Saryg-Sep

Area
  - Total: 25,726.04 km^{2} (9,932.88 sq mi)

Population (2010 Census)
  - Total: 12,279
  - Density: 0.47730/km^{2} (1.2362/sq mi)
  - Urban: 0%
  - Rural: 100%

Administrative structure
  - Administrative divisions: 11 sumon
  - Inhabited localities: 16 rural localities

Municipal structure
  - Municipally incorporated as: Kaa-Khemsky Municipal District
  - Municipal divisions: 0 urban settlements, 11 rural settlements
- Time zone: UTC+7 (MSK+4)
- OKTMO ID: 93620000
- Website: http://www.kaa-hem.ru/

Kaa-Khemsky District (also Kaa-Khemskiy) (Russian: Каа́-Хе́мский кожуун; Tuvan: Каа-Хем кожуун, Kaa-Xem kojuun) is an administrative and municipal district (raion, or kozhuun), one of the seventeen in the Tuva Republic, Russia. It is located in the center and east of the republic. The area of the district is 25,726.04 square kilometers (9,932.88 sq mi). Its administrative center is the rural locality (a selo) of Saryg-Sep. Population: 12,279 (2010 census); 13,071 (2002 Census); 14,982 (1989 Soviet census). The population of Saryg-Sep accounts for 36.0% of the district's total population.
