= Kyzylsky District =

Kyzylsky District Кызылский кожуун (Russian)
- District

Other transcription(s)
  - Tuvan: Кызыл кожуун
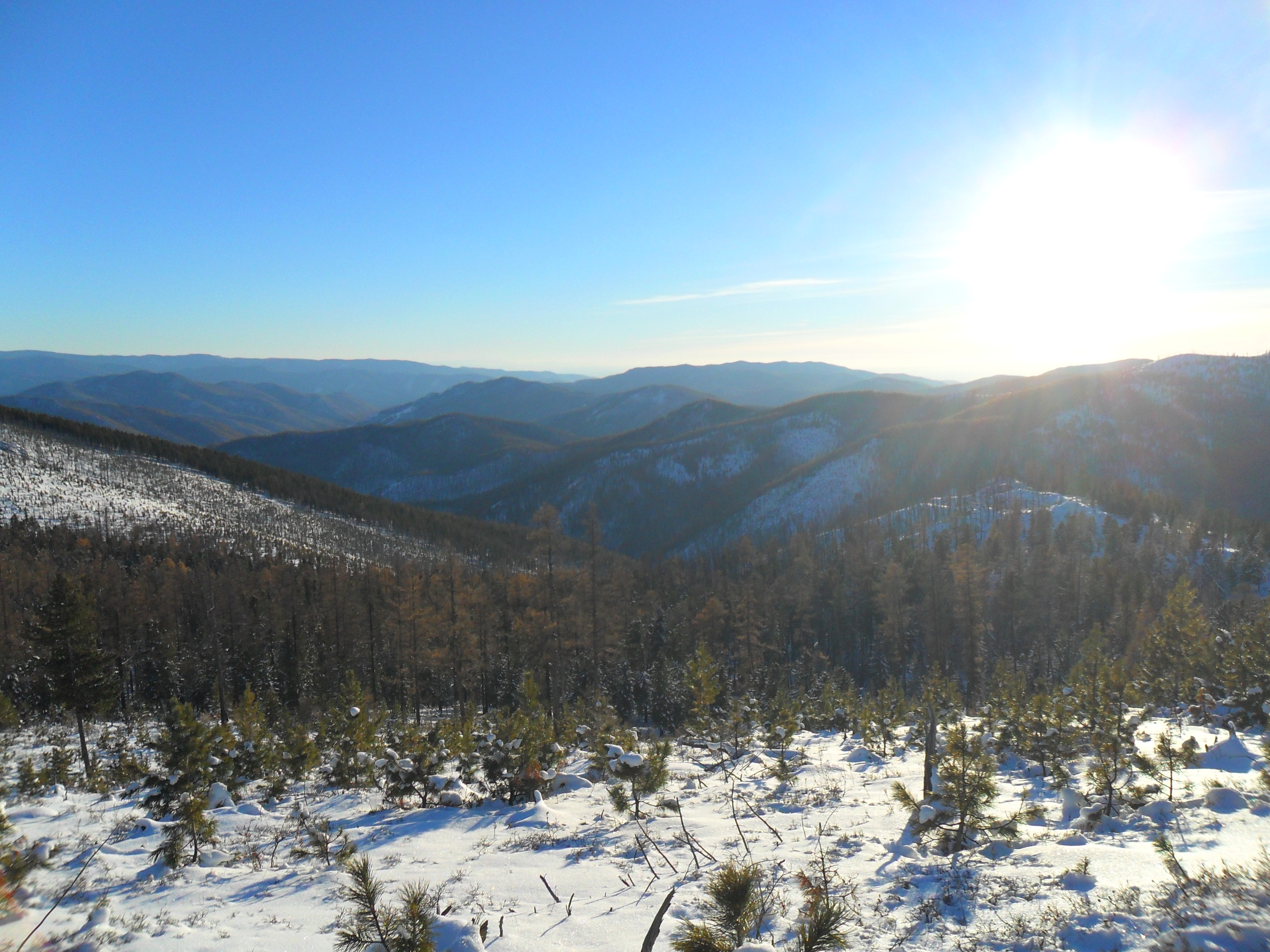
- Tapsinsky Park, Kyzylsky District

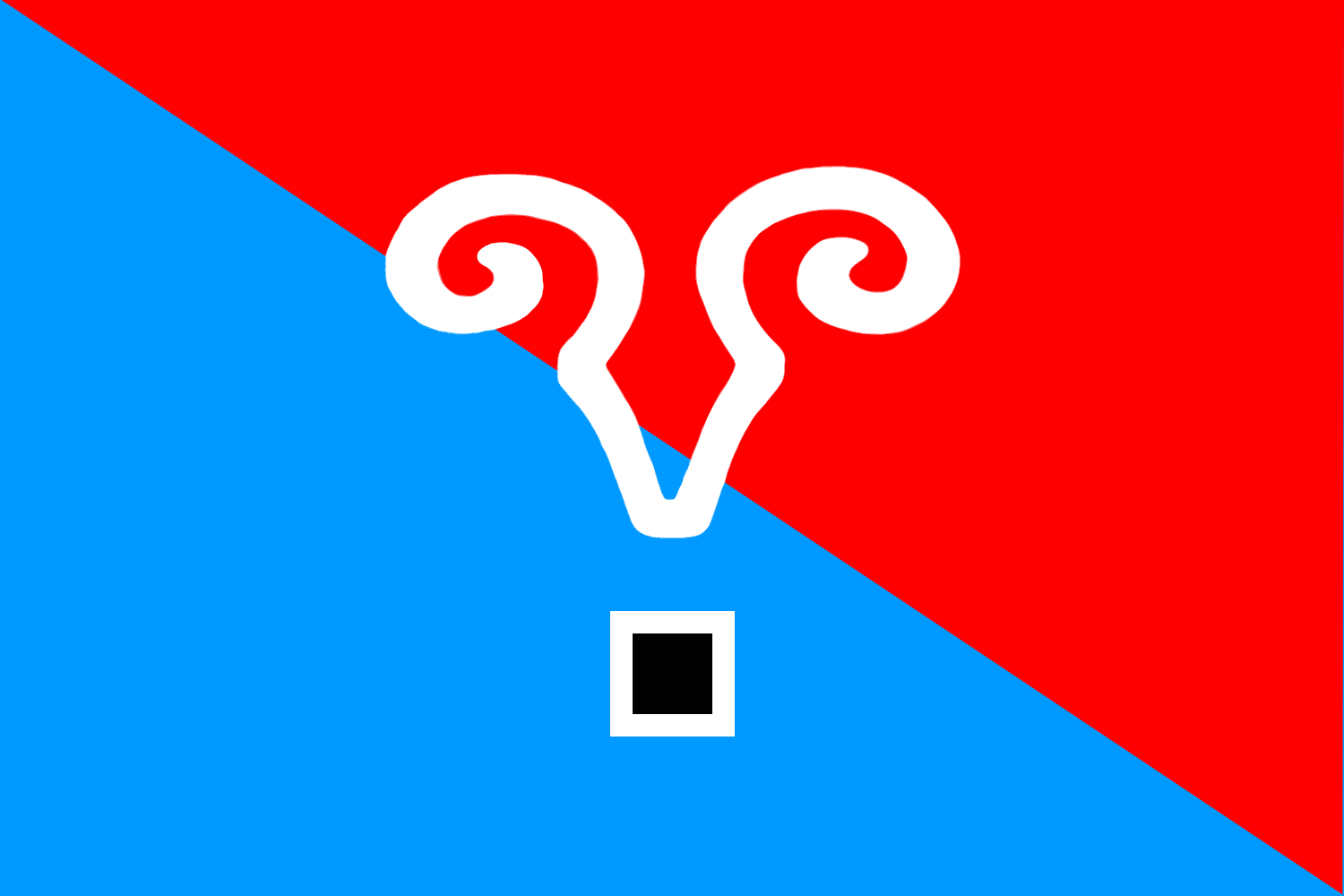
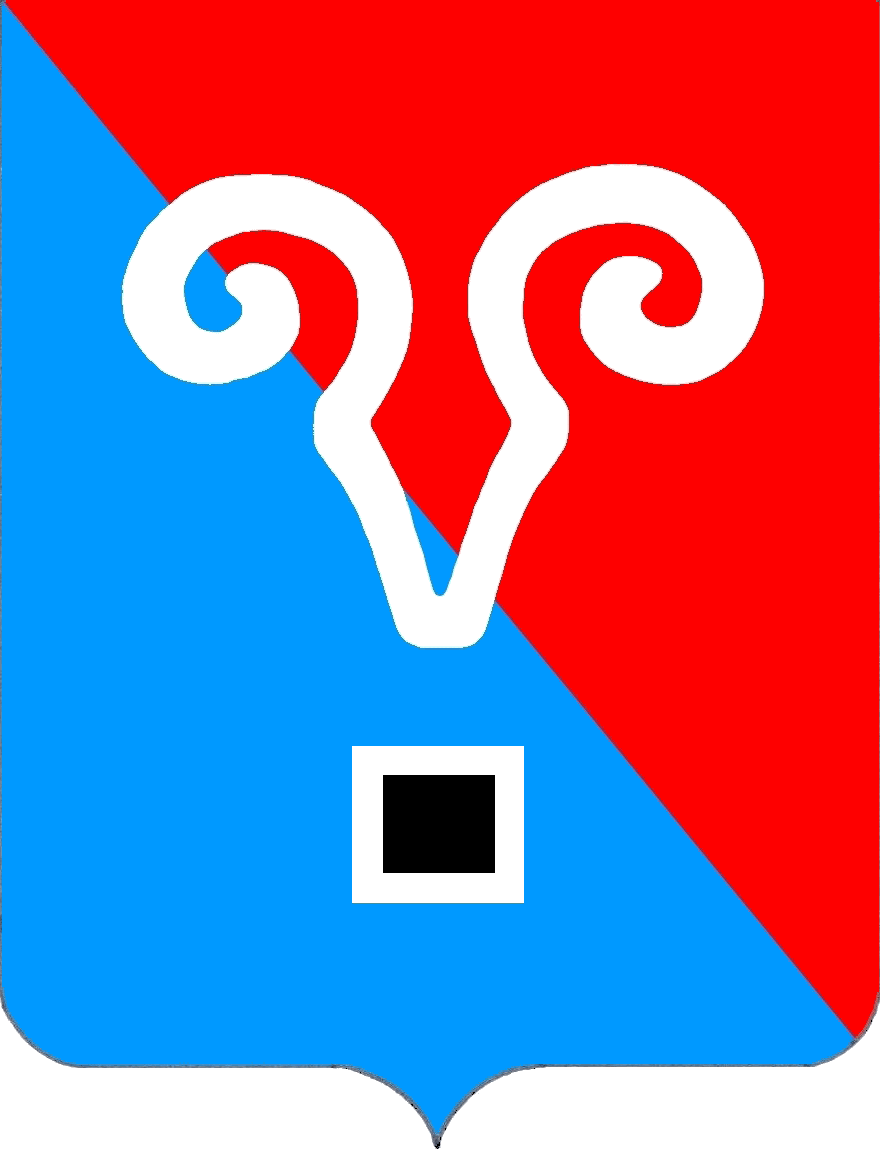
- Flag Coat of arms
- Location of Kyzylsky District in the Tuva Republic
- Coordinates: 51.787°N 93.490°E
- Country: Russia
- Federal subject: Tuva Republic
- Administrative center: Kaa-Khem

Area
  - Total: 8,526.65 km^{2} (3,292.16 sq mi)

Population (2010 Census)
  - Total: 27,659
  - Density: 3.2438/km^{2} (8.4015/sq mi)
  - Urban: 54.4%
  - Rural: 45.6%

Administrative structure
  - Administrative divisions: 1 Urban-type settlements (urban settlements), 9 Sumons
  - Inhabited localities: 1 urban-type settlements, 11 rural localities

Municipal structure
  - Municipally incorporated as: Kyzylsky Municipal District
  - Municipal divisions: 1 urban settlements, 9 rural settlements
- Time zone: UTC+7 (MSK+4)
- OKTMO ID: 93622000
- Website: http://kyzyl-kojuun.ru/

Kyzylsky District (Russian: Кызы́лский кожуун; Tuvan: Кызыл кожуун, Kızıl kojuun) is an administrative and municipal district (raion, or kozhuun), one of the seventeen in the Tuva Republic, Russia. It is located in the center of the republic. Its administrative center is the urban locality (an urban-type settlement) of Kaa-Khem. Population: 27,659 (2010 census); 22,678 (2002 Census); 22,205 (1989 Soviet census). The population of Kaa-Khem accounts for 54.4% of the district's total population.
