= 2021 Tuva head election =

- 17–19 September 2021
- Turnout: 82.76%
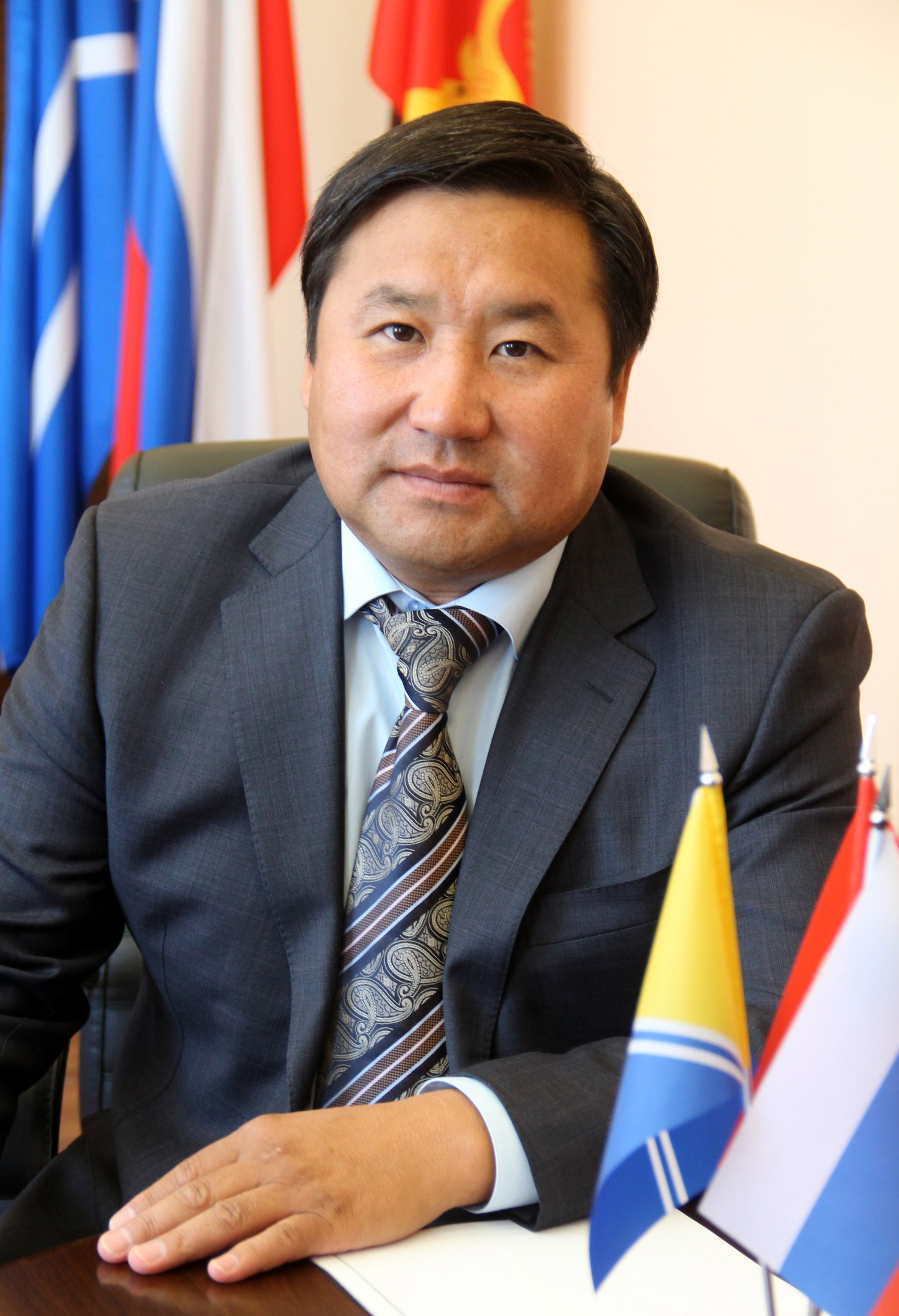
		CPRF
Candidate	Vladislav Khovalyg	Choygana Seden-ool
Party	United Russia	CPRF
Popular vote	142,159	6,623
Percentage	86.81%	4.04%
- Results by administrative division
Head before election
Vladislav Khovalyg
United Russia
Elected Head
Vladislav Khovalyg
United Russia

The 2021 Republic of Tuva head election took place on 17–19 September 2021, on common election day, coinciding with election to the State Duma. Acting Head Vladislav Khovalyg was elected for his first full term.

== Background ==
Sholban Kara-ool headed the Republic of Tuva for 14 years, from 2007-2021. He was previously Chairman of the Great Khural of Tuva in 1998-2002 before running in 2002 Tuva presidential election and losing to incumbent President Sherig-ool Oorzhak. Kara-ool won his last gubernatorial election in 2016 with 85.66% of the vote. On 7 April 2021 Sholban Kara-ool asked President Vladimir Putin for his resignation, the move was long expected due to Kara-ool's longevity of service and republic's weak development. Putin accepted Kara-ool's resignation and appointed Vladislav Khovalyg as acting Head of Tuva, Khovalyg previously served as general director of "Tyvaenergosbyt" (main regional electricity provider) in 2018-2021 and Mayor of Kyzyl in 2008-2018. Sholban Kara-ool was appointed as deputy general director of RusHydro and then announced his participation in State Duma election.

== Candidates ==
Only political parties can nominate candidates for head election in Tuva, self-nomination is not possible. However, a candidate is not obliged to be a member of the nominating party. Candidates for Head of the Republic of Tuva should be a Russian citizen and at least 30 years old. Candidates for Head should not have a foreign citizenship or residence permit. In order to be registered, each candidate is required to collect at least 9% of signatures of members and heads of municipalities (134-140 signatures). Also head candidates present 3 candidacies to the Federation Council and election winner later appoints one of the presented candidates.

=== Registered candidates ===
- Vladimir Chesnokov (Communists of Russia), acting Vice Chairman of the Kaa-Khem Administration for Livelihood and Public Utilities
- Aylanmaa Kan-ool (The Greens), director of Kyzyl College of Art
- Vladislav Khovalyg (United Russia), acting Head - Chairman of the Government of the Republic of Tuva, former mayor of Kyzyl (2008-2018), 2016 head candidate in the primary
- Andrey Sat (Party of Growth), former Tuva Commissioner for Entrepreneurs' Rights (2014-2020)
- Choygana Seden-ool (CPRF), teacher at Dus-Dag Middle School

=== Failed to qualify ===
- Oleg Ponomarenko (Cossack Party of the Russian Federation), former acting general director of "Tyvaenergosbyt" (2016-2018)
- Viktor Popov (LDPR), former Member of the Great Khural of Tuva (2019-2020)

=== Declined ===
- Arat Mongush, former Kyzyl chief of police
- Andrian Oorzhak (LDPR), former Member of the Great Khural of Tuva (2006-2020), son of former Tuva President Sherig-ool Oorzhak
- Vasily Oyun (SR-ZP), former Speaker of the Legislative Assembly of the Great Khural of Tuva (2002-2009)

=== Candidates for the Federation Council ===
TBA

== Finances ==
All sums are in rubles.

Financial Report	Source	Chesnokov	Kan-ool	Khovalyg	Ponomarenko	Popov	Sat	Seden-ool
First		5,550	3,000	2,178,050	TBA	TBA	18,700	223,000
Final		5,550	3,000	30,672,261	3,000	250,000	18,700	324,667

== Results ==
Summary of the 17-19 September 2021 Tuva head election results
Candidate	Party	Votes	%
Vladislav Khovalyg (incumbent)	United Russia	142,159	86.81
Choygana Seden-ool	Communist Party	6,623	4.04
Aylanmaa Kan-ool	The Greens	5,617	3.43
Vladimir Chesnokov	Communists of Russia	4,204	2.57
Andrey Sat	Party of Growth	3,312	2.02
Valid votes		161,915	98.87
Blank ballots		1,851	1.13
Total		163,766	100.00
Turnout		163,766	82.76
Registered voters		197,874	100.00

Incumbent Senator Lyudmila Narusova (Independent) was re-appointed to the Federation Council.
