= 2026 Tuvan head election =

Regional legislative election in Russia

- 18–20 September 2026
- Turnout: 83.25% ▲0.49 pp
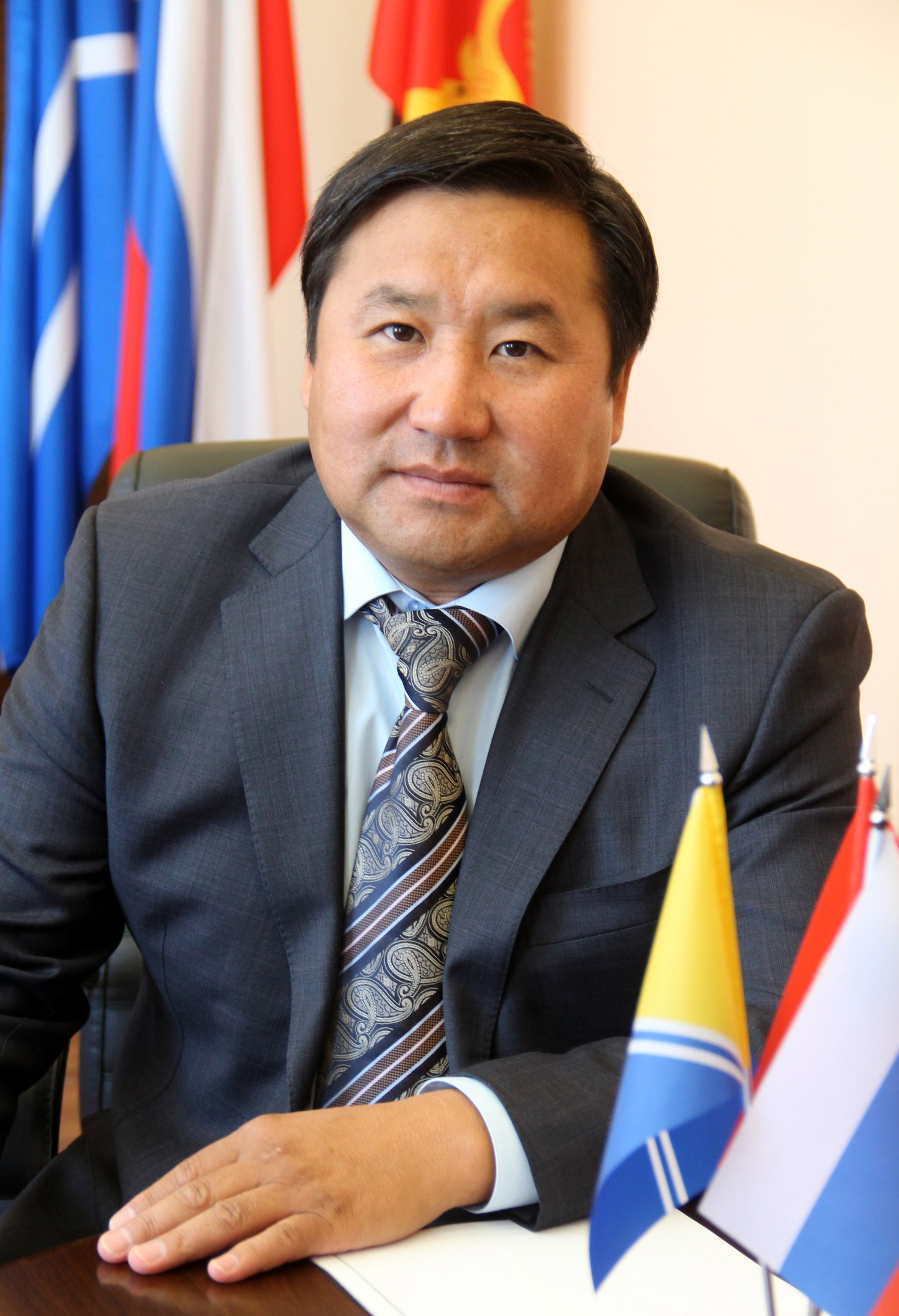
| | | NL |
| Candidate | Vladislav Khovalyg | Artysh Irgit |
| Party | United Russia | New People |
| Popular vote | 159,283 | 5,143 |
| Percentage | 90.95% | 2.94% |
Head before election
Vladislav Khovalyg
United Russia
Head-elect
Vladislav Khovalyg
United Russia
Senator before election
Lyudmila Narusova
Independent
Senator after election
Lyudmila Narusova
Independent

The 2026 Republic of Tuva head election took place on 18–20 September 2026, on common election day, to elect the Head of the Republic of Tuva, coinciding with the 2026 Russian legislative election. Incumbent Head Vladislav Khovalyg was re-elected for a second term in office.

== Background ==
Sholban Kara-ool, who has served as Head of the Republic of Tuva since 2007, announced his resignation from office in April 2021, five month before his term would have expired. President of Russia Vladimir Putin accepted Kara-ool's resignation and appointed Vladislav Khovalyg, an energy executive and former Kyzyl mayor, as acting Head of the Republic of Tuva. Kara-ool's resignation was long expected due to his longevity in office, poor ratings and low economic base. Khovalyg easily won an election for a full term in September 2021, gaining 86.81% of the vote, as United Russia dominated Tuvan politics for decades. Meanwhile, Kara-ool was elected to the State Duma on the United Russia party list and became among the Duma's deputy chairmen.

During his first term Khovalyg prioritised new infrastructure projects in the impoverished republic, including the first railway line and lithium mining, however, the two projects are far from completion. Notably, Khovalyg broke from his predecessor Kara-ool, which was apparent during the 2024 Tuva Great Khural election when Kara-ool sparred with United Russia and governmental officials after his allies, including Senator Dina Oyun, were defeated in the primary. Federal authorities took Khovalyg's side and demanded Kara-ool to cease all hostilities. Khovalyg also allegedly drifted away from former Minister of Defense Sergey Shoigu, the highest ranking Tuvan in the Russian government, who enjoyed extreme popularity in the republic and exercised effective control over the region for decades; the rift was evident when Shoigu's closest confidant Ruslan Tsalikov was denied the appointment to the Federation Council and remained backbench member of the Great Khural of the Republic of Tuva until his arrest in March 2026.

On May 22, 2026, Khovalyg met with President Putin and asked his endorsement for the upcoming head election, which Putin agreed to.

== Candidates ==
In Tuva candidates for Head of the Republic of Tuva can be nominated only by registered political parties. Candidate for Head of the Republic of Tuva should be a Russian citizen and at least 30 years old. Candidates for Head of the Republic of Tuva should not have a foreign citizenship or residence permit. Each candidate in order to be registered is required to collect at least 9% of signatures of municipal deputies and heads of municipalities. Also head candidates present 3 candidacies to the Federation Council and election winner later appoints one of the presented candidates.

=== Declared ===
| Candidate name, political party | | Occupation | Status | Ref. |
|---|---|---|---|---|
| Aziat Chanzan; A Just Russia | | Former acting Head of the Tuva Service for Civil Defense and Emergency Situations (2024–2025); Retired police major | Registered | |
| Yegor Chistyakov; Liberal Democratic Party | | Transportation tekhnikum director | Registered | |
| Artysh Irgit; New People | | Nonprofit director | Registered | |
| Vladislav Khovalyg; United Russia | Vladislav Khovalyg | Incumbent Head of the Republic of Tuva (2021–present) | Registered | |
| Lodoy-Damba Kuular; Communist Party | | Member of Great Khural of Tuva (2024–present) | Registered | |

=== Candidates for Federation Council ===
| Head candidate, political party | Candidates for Federation Council | Status |
|---|---|---|
| Vladislav Khovalyg; United Russia | * Aleksandr Adygbay, Commissioner for Human Rights in Tuva (2022–present) * Suren Bady, Russian Army guards podpolkovnik * Lyudmila Narusova, incumbent Senator (2016–present) | Registered |

== Finances ==
All sums are in rubles.

| Financial Report | Source | Chanzan | Chistyakov | Irgit | Khovalyg | Kuular |
|---|---|---|---|---|---|---|
| First | | 180,000 | 238,300 | 178,000 | 42,905,500 | 176,700 |
| Final | | TBD | TBD | TBD | TBD | TBD |

== Results ==
Summary of the 18–20 September 2026 Tuvan head election results
| Candidate | Party | Votes | % |
|---|---|---|---|
| Vladislav Khovalyg (incumbent) | United Russia | 159,283 | 90.95 |
| Artysh Irgit | New People | 5,143 | 2.94 |
| Lodoy-Damba Kuular | Communist Party | 4,927 | 2.81 |
| Yegor Chistyakov | Liberal Democratic Party | 3,282 | 1.87 |
| Aziat Chanzan | A Just Russia | 2,061 | 1.18 |
| Valid votes | | 174,696 | 99.75 |
| Blank ballots | | 441 | 0.25 |
| Total | | 175,137 | 100.00 |
| Turnout | | 175,137 | 83.25 |
| Registered voters | | 210,374 | 100.00 |

Head Khovalyg re-appointed incumbent Senator Lyudmila Narusova (Independent) to the Federation Council.

== See also ==
- 2026 Russian regional elections
