= Head of the Republic of Tuva =

Highest-ranking official in Tuva, Russia

- Тыва Республиканың баштыңы (Tuvan); Глава Республики Тыва (Russian)
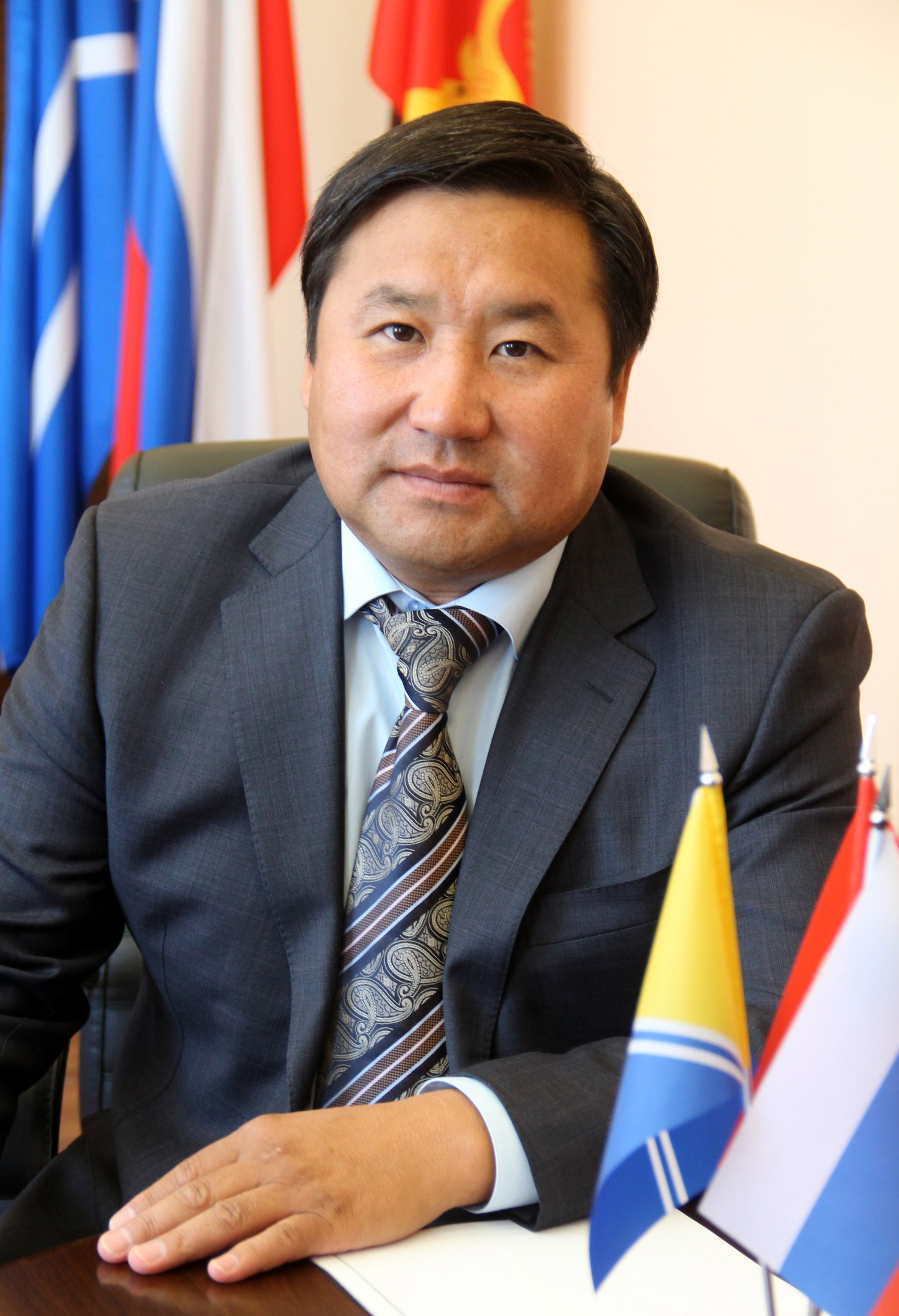
- Incumbent; Vladislav Khovalyg since 7 April 2021
- Executive branch of the Republic of Tuva
- Style: His Excellency; The Honorable
- Type: Governor; Head of state; Head of government
- Seat: Kyzyl
- Nominator: Political parties
- Appointer: Direct elections
- Term length: 5 years
- Constituting instrument: Constitution of Tuva, Section 10
- Formation: 18 December 1991
- First holder: Sherig-ool Oorzhak
- Website: Official website

The Head of the Republic of Tuva (formerly known as the President of the Republic of Tuva) is the highest office within the Republic of Tuva in Russia. The Head is Head of State and Head of Government of Tuva. The Head is elected by citizens of Russia residing in the republic. Term of service is five years.

== List ==
No.	Portrait	Name (born–died)	Term of office			Political party	Elected	Ref.
No.	Portrait	Name (born–died)	Took office	Left office	Time in office	Political party	Elected	Ref.
1		Sherig-ool Oorzhak (1942–2026)	27 March 1992	6 April 2007	15 years, 10 days	Independent	1992; 1997; 2002	
1		Sherig-ool Oorzhak (1942–2026)	27 March 1992	6 April 2007	15 years, 10 days	United Russia	1992; 1997; 2002	
2		Sholban Kara-ool (born 1966)	6 April 2007	23 May 2016	14 years, 1 day	United Russia	2007 (Note: Appointed by the President of Russia with the consent of the Great Khural.); 2012	
–		Sholban Kara-ool (born 1966)	23 May 2016	22 September 2016	14 years, 1 day	United Russia	– (Note: Acting head of the republic)	
(2)		Sholban Kara-ool (born 1966)	22 September 2016	7 April 2021	14 years, 1 day	United Russia	2016	
–		Vladislav Khovalyg (born 1967)	7 April 2021	28 September 2021	5 years, 178 days	United Russia	–	
3		Vladislav Khovalyg (born 1967)	28 September 2021	Incumbent	5 years, 178 days	United Russia	2021; 2026	

== Elections ==
The latest election for the office was held on 17-19 September 2021

Candidates	Party	Votes	%
Vladimir Chesnokov	Communists of Russia	4,204	2.57
Andrey Sat	Party of Growth	3,312	2.02
Vladislav Khovalyg	United Russia	142,159	86.81
Choygana Seden-ool	Communist Party of the Russian Federation	6,623	4.04
Aylanmaa Kan-ool	The Greens	5,617	3.43
