= 1991–92 Russian gubernatorial elections =

- 12 June 1991 – 15 March 1992

12 directly elected chief executives
- 1991–92 Russian regional elections: Chief executive Supreme Soviet Chief executive and Supreme Soviet Referendum Referendum and chief executive

Gubernatorial elections in 1991 and 1992 took place in 11 federal subjects of Russia. Moscow, Saint Petersburg, Tatarstan, Kalmykia, Mari El, Mordovia, Sakha and Chuvashia held their first elections in 1991. In Adygea and Kabardino-Balkaria second tours were held after the New Year celebrations. Tuva was the only one region of the Russian Federation to held its first presidential election in 1992, ignoring the year-long moratorium introduced by Russian parliament in late 1991.

In Adygea, Mari El, Tatarstan and Sakha, the language qualification was applied at the elections, that is, the candidates were required to know the language of the titular ethnic group.

== Background ==
In 1990, a fundamentally important reform took place: the speakers of the regional Supreme Councils (in the republics) and the chairmen of the Soviets of People's Deputies (in oblasts, krais, autonomous okrugs and federal cities) became senior officials instead of the first secretaries of the CPSU local committees.

After the August putsch of 1991, Russian president Boris Yeltsin signed a decree "On the issues of the activities of executive authorities." According to this document, regional administrations with Head of administration as the senior official in the region. Heads of administrations were appointed and removed from office by the president. However, this rule did not apply to autonomous republics where the highest official was elected directly by voters or by deputies of local parliaments (In 1991, elections were held in 8 of 21 republics). On 24 October 1991, the Supreme Soviet of Russia adopted the law "On the election of the head of administration" and scheduled the elections in a number of Russian regions for December 8 of the same year.

However a week later, on November 1, the Congress of People's Deputies introduced a moratorium on gubernatorial elections until December 1992 and approved the president's right to appoint regional leaders.

== Race summary ==
Region	Leadership before election	Election day	Candidates	Result
Moscow	Gavriil Popov, chairman of the city council Yury Luzhkov, chairman of the executive committee	12 June	✓ Gavriil Popov 65.32%; Valery Saykin 16.35%	Gavriil Popov elected mayor
Leningrad	Anatoly Sobchak, chairman of the city council Aleksandr Shchelkanov, chairman of the executive committee	12 June	✓ Anatoly Sobchak 66.13%; Yuri Sevenard 25.72%; Against all 7.15%	Anatoly Sobchak elected mayor
Tatar SSR	Mintimer Shaimiev, chairman of the Supreme Soviet; Mukhammat Sabirov, premier	12 June	✓ Mintimer Shaimiev 70.6%; Against all 29.3%	Mintimer Shaimiev elected president
Kalmyk SSR	Vladimir Basanov, chairman of the Supreme Soviet; Batyr Mikhailov, premier	19 October (first round)	Batyr Mikhailov 33.70%; Vladimir Basanov 32.10%	Election results annulled, as none of the candidates had reached 50% of the vote
Kalmyk SSR	Vladimir Basanov, chairman of the Supreme Soviet; Batyr Mikhailov, premier	3 November (runoff)	Batyr Mikhailov 45.30%; Vladimir Basanov 40.37%	Election results annulled, as none of the candidates had reached 50% of the vote
Chechnya	disputed	27 October	✓ Dzhokhar Dudayev (VDP) 90.1%	Dzhokhar Dudayev elected president
Mari SSR	Vladislav Zotin, chairman of the Supreme Soviet; Gennady Petrov, premier	8 December (first round)	Vladislav Zotin 48.09%; Anatoly Popov 11.19%; Aleksandr Kazimov 11.1%	Vladislav Zotin elected president
Mari SSR	Vladislav Zotin, chairman of the Supreme Soviet; Gennady Petrov, premier	14 December (runoff)	✓ Vladislav Zotin 58.85%; Anatoly Popov 15.02%; Against all 24.10%	Vladislav Zotin elected president
Chuvash SSR	Eduard Kubarev, chairman of the Supreme Soviet; Nikolay Zaytsev, premier	8 December (first round)	Leonid Prokopyev 28.3%; Atner Khuzangai 20.2%; Eduard Kubarev 13.74%	Election results annulled, as none of the candidates had reached 50% of the vote
Chuvash SSR	Eduard Kubarev, chairman of the Supreme Soviet; Nikolay Zaytsev, premier	22 December (runoff)	Atner Khuzangai 46.4%; Leonid Prokopyev 43.1%	Election results annulled, as none of the candidates had reached 50% of the vote
Mordovian SSR	Nikolay Biryukov, chairman of the Supreme Soviet; Anatoly Paulov, premier	14 December (first round)	Nikolay Biryukov 18.88%; Vasily Guslyannikov 16.56%; Nikolay Medvedev 13.14%; Sergey Sorokin 9.49%; Nikolay Merkushkin 8.64%; Pavel Gruznov 5.71%	Vasily Guslyannikov elected president
Mordovian SSR	Nikolay Biryukov, chairman of the Supreme Soviet; Anatoly Paulov, premier	22 December (runoff)	✓ Vasily Guslyannikov 56.25%; Nikolay Biryukov 36.25%	Vasily Guslyannikov elected president
Yakut–Sakha SSR	Mikhail Nikolayev, chairman of the Supreme Soviet; Kliment Ivanov, premier	20 December	✓ Mikhail Nikolayev 76.71%; Ivan Cherov 7.30%; Against all 13.99%	Mikhail Nikolayev elected president
SSR Adygea	Aslan Dzharimov, chairman of the Supreme Soviet; Mugdin Tlekhas, chairman of the executive committee	22 December (first round)	Aslan Dzharimov 39.75%; Pshimaf Khakuz 17.28%; Aslanbiy Khutyz 9.31%; Boris Merzakulov 8.28%	Aslan Dzharimov elected president
SSR Adygea	Aslan Dzharimov, chairman of the Supreme Soviet; Mugdin Tlekhas, chairman of the executive committee	5 January 1992 (runoff)	✓ Aslan Dzharimov 69.4%; Pshimaf Khakuz 23.4%	Aslan Dzharimov elected president
Kabardino-Balkarian SSR	Khachim Karmokov, chairman of the Supreme Soviet; Georgy Cherkesov, premier	22 December (first round)	Valery Kokov 39.30%; Felix Kharayev 19.75%; Khachim Karmokov 14.52%; Pyotr Ivanov 13.5%	Valery Kokov elected president
Kabardino-Balkarian SSR	Khachim Karmokov, chairman of the Supreme Soviet; Georgy Cherkesov, premier	5 January 1992 (runoff)	✓ Valery Kokov 88.86%; Against all 11.1%	Valery Kokov elected president
Tuva	Kaadyr-ool Bicheldey, chairman of the Supreme Soviet; Sherig-ool Oorzhak, premier	15 March 1992	✓ Sherig-ool Oorzhak 83.2%; Bair Sanchi 9.6%	Sherig-ool Oorzhak elected president

== Adygea ==
1991–92 Adygea presidential election
- 22 December 1991; 5 January 1992 (runoff)
- Turnout: 59.9%
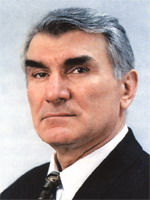

Candidate	Aslan Dzharimov	Pshimaf Khakuz
Percentage	69.4%	23.4%

The first round was held on 22 December 1991. None of the six candidates could reach 50% of the vote. Chairman of the Supreme Soviet of Adygea Aslan Dzharimov won the presidency defeating associate professor Pshimaf Khakuz of Krasnodar Polytechnic Institute in a runoff which held on 5 January 1992. Other candidates were people's deputy of Russia Aslanbiy Khutyz, deputy chairman of Maykop City Council Boris Merzakulov and director of Adygea Pedagogical College Kazbek Achmiz.

Candidate	First round	Second round
Aslan Dzharimov	39.75%	69.4%
Pshimaf Khakuz	17.28%	23.4%
Aslanbiy Khutyz	9.31%	
Boris Merzakulov	8.28%	
Kazbek Achmiz	4.39%	

== Chechnya ==
1991 Chechen presidential election
- 27 October 1991
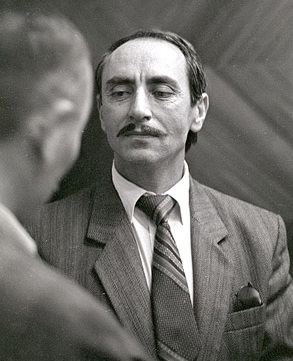
Candidate	Dzhokhar Dudayev
Party	VDP
Percentage	90.1%

The presidential elections in self-proclaimed Chechen Republic of Ichkeria were held on 27 October 1991. Dzhokhar Dudayev was proclaimed the winner. Elections were scheduled by the "All-National Congress of the Chechen People", which seized power in eastern portions of falling apart Republic of Checheno-Ingushetia. According to official statements, 72% of the adult population of Chechnya came to the precincts, and 90.1% of them voted for Dudayev. Russian-speaking population of Chechnya did not take part in the voting. The Provisional Supreme Council and the Council of Ministers of Checheno-Ingushetia declared elections rigged and refused to recognize their results.

On November 2, the Congress of People's Deputies of Russia refused to recognize the election results. An attempt was made to introduce a state of emergency in Checheno-Ingushetia, but this attempt was unsuccessful. The following year, Russian troops were withdrawn from the republic and Dudayev's secessionist government obtained full power over Chechnya until the First Chechen war broke out in 1994.

== Chuvashia ==
1991 Chuvash presidential election
- 8 December 1991 (first round); 22 December 1991 (second round)
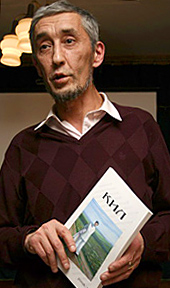

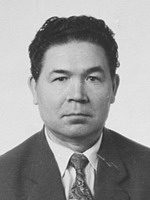
Candidate	Atner Khuzangai	Leonid Prokopyev
Popular vote	232,525	216,064
Percentage	46.42%	43.13%

A presidential election was held in Chuvashia on 8 December 1991. Former communist nomenklatura was represented by Leonid Prokopyev, former chairman of the Chuvash SSR council of ministers (1975–89). He won a plurality in the first round, surpassing activist of "Chuvash National Revival" movement, member of the Supreme Soviet Atner Khuzangai, Chairman of the Supreme Soviet Eduard Kubarev and leader of agricultural workers' union Pyotr Ivantayev. To win in the runoff, which held on 22 December 1991, a candidate needed to gather more than 50% of the vote. As neither Prokopyev, nor Khuzangai won, the presidency remained vacant until December 1993, when former Justice Minister of Russia Nikolay Fyodorov won the recall election.

Candidate	Running mate	Party	First round	Second round	%
Atner Khuzangai	Vladimir Arefyev	Chuvash National Revival	20.2%	232,525	46.42
Leonid Prokopyev	Anatoly Fadeyev		28.3%	216,064	43.13
Eduard Kubarev	Nikolay Kurchatov	Democratic Alternative	13.74%		
Pyotr Ivantayev	Aleksandr Malyutin	Peasant Union	13.2%		
Against all			19.6%	52,364	10.45
Invalid ballots			5.0%	52,364	10.45
Turnout			58.6%	500,953	56.7

== Kabardino-Balkaria ==
1991–92 Kabardino-Balkarian presidential election
- 22 December 1991 (first round); 5 January 1992 (second round)
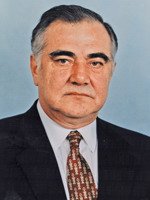
Candidate	Valery Kokov
Popular vote	233,130
Percentage	88.86%

The first round was held on 22 December 1991. None of the four candidates could reach 50% of the vote. The second round was scheduled on 5 January 1992. Deputy chairman of the Council of Ministers of Kabardino-Balkaria Valery Kokov ran uncontested after trucking company director Felix Kharayev withdrew his candidacy. Chairman of the Supreme Soviet Khachim Karmokov placed third and did not qualify for the runoff.

The Balkars massively boycotted the elections in pursuance of the decision of the "Congress of the Balkar People". This meeting in November 1991 proclaimed the creation of the "Republic of Balkaria" and formed the "National Council of the Balkar People". Sufiyan Beppayev, deputy commander of the Transcaucasian Military District, was elected its chairman.

The council decided to hold a "referendum" on December 29 among the Balkars on the creation of a new autonomous republic. Voting was organized not only in majority-Balkar settlements, but also in Nalchik. The positive expression of the will of the majority of Balkars and their subsequent boycott of the presidential elections (polling stations were not even opened in Balkar villages) allowed the national activists to deny Valery Kokov's right to be called the president of Kabardino-Balkaria.

Candidate	First round	%	Second round	%
Valery Kokov		39.30	233,130	88.86
Felix Kharayev		19.75		
Khachim Karmokov		14.52		
Pyotr Ivanov		13.5		
Against all			29,133	11.11
Invalid ballots			83	0.03
Total			262,346	100
Turnout		53.6	487,633	53.80

== Kalmykia ==
1991 Kalmyk presidential election
- 19 October 1991 (first round); 3 November 1991 (second round)

The first presidential election in Kalmykia was held on 19 October and 3 November 1991. 62.13% of the population participated in the first round and 57.6% in the second round. Neither of three candidates, chairman of the Council of Ministers Batyr Mikhailov, Supreme Soviet chairman Vladimir Basanov or head of Chernozemelsky District administration Vladimir Chumudov could reach 50% of the vote in first round or in the runoff, as the laws required.

Next elections were held in April 1993 with Kirsan Ilyumzhinov becoming President of Kalmykia.

Candidate	First round	Second round
Batyr Mikhailov	33.79%	45.3%
Vladimir Basanov	32.18%	40.37%
Vladimir Chumudov		
Against all		
Invalid ballots		

== Leningrad ==
1991 Leningrad mayoral election
- 12 June 1991
- Turnout: 64.89%
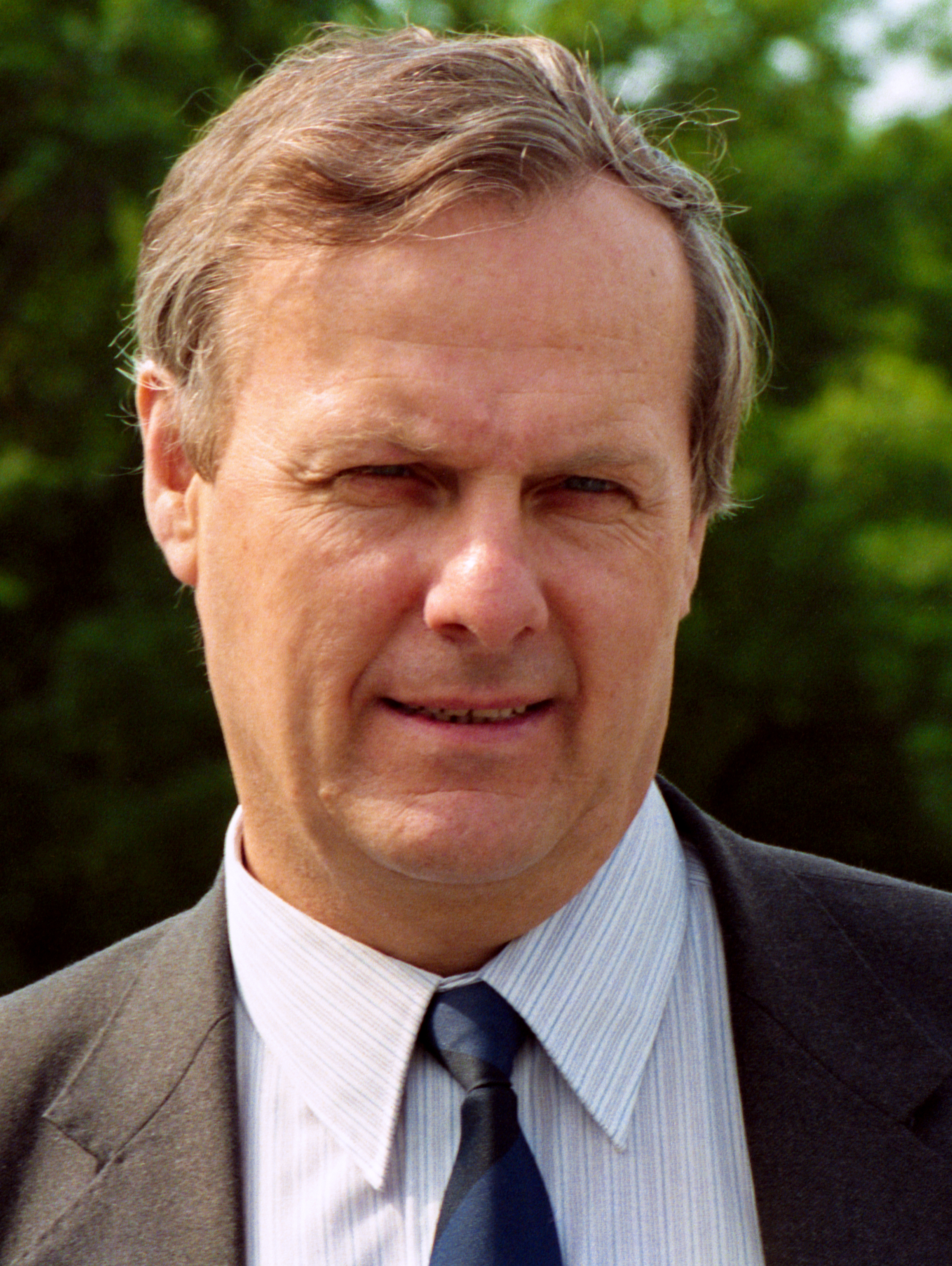

Candidate	Anatoly Sobchak	Yuri Sevenard
Running mate	Vyacheslav Shcherbakov	Yury Denisov
Popular vote	1,623,659	631,367
Percentage	66.13%	25.72%

Election of the mayor of Leningrad were held on 12 June 1991 simultaneously with the election of the President of the RSFSR. Chairman of Leningrad City Council Anatoly Sobchak won with 66% of the vote, representing the democratic anti-communist forces. Sobchak's only rival was Yuri Sevenard, member of the Leningrad City Council, director of Lengidroenergospetsstroy industrial construction association. Three months later Leningrad was officially renamed Saint Petersburg following a referendum.

Candidate	Running mate	Votes	%
Anatoly Sobchak	Vyacheslav Shcherbakov	1,623,659	66.13
Yuri Sevenard	Yury Denisov	631,367	25.72
Against all		175,532	7.15
Invalid ballots		25,258	1.03
Total		2,455,089	100
Registered voters/turnout		3,783,284	64.89

== Mari El ==
1991 Mari El presidential election
- 8 December 1991 (first round); 14 December 1991 (second round)
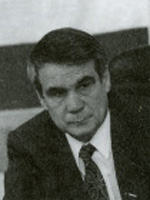

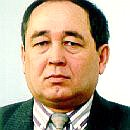
Candidate	Vladislav Zotin	Anatoly Popov
Running mate	Viktor Galavteyev	V. Aristov
Popular vote	205,363	52,406
Percentage	58.85%	15.02%
Chairman of the Supreme Soviet before election
Vladislav Zotin
Elected president
Vladislav Zotin

The first round was held on 8 December 1991. No candidate won a majority. Chairman of the Supreme Soviet Vladislav Zotin became the first president of Mari El Republic after winning in the runoff on 14 December. His opponents were historian Aleksandr Kazimov, supported by Democratic Russia, and director of Yoshkar-Ola shoe factory Anatoly Popov, affiliated with Mari Ushem movement.

Candidate	Running mate	First round		Second round	
Candidate	Running mate	Votes	%	Votes	%
Vladislav Zotin	Viktor Galavteyev		48.09	205,363	58.85
Anatoly Popov	V. Aristov		11.19	52,406	15.02
Aleksandr Kazimov	Mikhail Zhukov		11.1		
Against all				84,120	24.10
Invalid ballots				7,096	2.03
Total				348,985	100

== Mordovia ==
1991 Mordovian presidential election
- 14 December 1991 (first round); 22 December 1991 (second round)
- Turnout: 57.7% (first round); 57.4% (second round)
Candidate	Vasily Guslyannikov	Nikolay Biryukov
Popular vote	218,849	141,052
Percentage	56.25%	36.25%
Chairman of the Supreme Soviet before election
Nikolay Biryukov
Elected president
Vasily Guslyannikov

Presidential election was held in Mordovia on 14 December 1991 to determine the first president of the Mordovian Soviet Socialist Republic. As none of the candidates secured the majority, a second round of voting was held on 22 December, won by engineer and political activist Vasily Guslyannikov.

The presidency was introduced following a constitutional amendment in October 1991, initiated by the Supreme Soviet chairman and nominal head of state Nikolay Biryukov. Although he soon emerged as a frontrunner, Biryukov was not fully backed by the post-communist elite and a number of minor candidates with similar nomenklatura background offered their candidacies as well.

The pro-Yeltsin, reformist camp centered around their nominee, Supreme Soviet member Vasily Guslyannikov, who had received attention after his alleged assassination attempt in December 1990. Although Guslyannikov had a strong base among intelligentsia and campaigned actively in rural areas, he was not taken seriously by establishment candidates.

In the second round, Biryukov and Guslyannikov were effectively representing stability and radical change. Guslyannikov's victory was secured by the electorate of the losing candidates, primarily Russian-speaking and opposing the idea of Biryukov coming to power. Furthermore, the assassination attempt had strengthened Guslyannikov's image as a fighter, which outweighed his managerial inexperience in the eyes of voters.

=== Candidates ===
- Nikolay Biryukov, chairman of the Supreme Soviet of the Mordovian SSR
  - Valentin Tarasov, deputy chairman of the Council of Ministers
- Pavel Gruznov, deputy chairman of the Council of Ministers
  - Vladimir Volkov, member of the Supreme Soviet
- Vasily Guslyannikov, senior researcher, Research Association of Power Electronics, Democratic Russia leader in the Supreme Soviet
  - Vladimir Narezhny, head of nature management department, Mordovian State University
- Mikhail Kovshov, first deputy chairman of the Council of Ministers
  - Leonid Mayorov, deputy chairman of the State Committee of Economy
- Nikolay Makarkin, rector of the Mordovian State University
  - Aleksandr Burkanov, deputy chairman of the Supreme Soviet
- Nikolay Medvedev, people's deputy of Russia
  - Valentin Konakov, director of the Agro-Industrial Institute, Mordovian State University
- Nikolay Merkushkin, chairman of the State Property Fund of Mordovia
  - Viktor Skoptsov, member of the Supreme Soviet
- Sergey Sorokin, chair of the Supreme Soviet Economic Reform Committee
  - Dmitry Dolenko, head of political science department, Mordovian State University

=== Results ===
Candidate	Running mate	First round	%	Second round	%
Vasily Guslyannikov	Vladimir Narezhny	64,691	16.56	218,849	56.25
Nikolay Biryukov	Valentin Tarasov	73,747	18.88	141,052	36.25
Nikolay Medvedev	Valentin Konakov	51,306	13.14		
Sergey Sorokin	Dmitry Dolenko	37,029	9.49		
Nikolay Merkushkin	Viktor Skoptsov	33,737	8.64		
Pavel Gruznov	Vladimir Volkov	22,313	5.71		
Nikolay Makarkin	Aleksandr Burkanov	11,193	2.87		
Mikhail Kovshov	Leonid Mayorov	9,774	2.50		
Against all		86,771	22.22		7.50
Invalid ballots		86,771	22.22		7.50
Total		390,561	100		100
Eligible voters/turnout		677,023	57.69		57.4

== Moscow ==
1991 Moscow mayoral election
- 12 June 1991
- Turnout: 66.5%
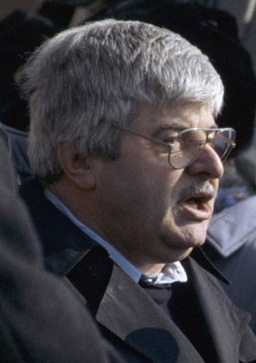

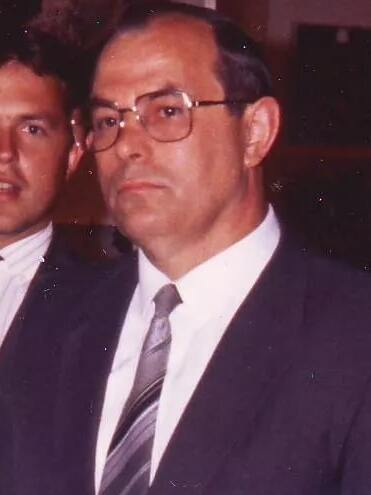
Candidate	Gavriil Popov	Valery Saykin
Party	Independent	Independent
Alliance	Democratic Russia	CPSU
Running mate	Yury Luzhkov	Aleksandr Krayko
Popular vote	3,014,248	754,390
Percentage	65.32%	16.35%
- Election map by district Popov: 55–60%; 60–65%; 65–70%; 75–80%

Election of the mayor and vice mayor of Moscow were held on 12 June 1991 simultaneously with the election of the President of the RSFSR. Chairman of the Moscow City Council Gavriil Popov won earning 65% of the vote. In June 1992 Popov resigned and his vice mayor, former chairman of the city executive committee Yury Luzhkov succeeded him.

Former chairman of executive committee of the Moscow City Council Valery Saykin, Chairman of Sevastopolsky District council Aleksey Bryachikhin, Head of Spektr scientific production association Vladimir Klyuyev and sports center manager Valentina Rodionova were the opponents of Popov-Luzhkov ticket. Saykin, Bryachikhin and Klyuyev were backed by Moscow city committee of the Communist Party.

Candidate	Running mate	Votes	%
Gavriil Popov	Yury Luzhkov	3,014,248	65.32
Valery Saykin	Aleksandr Krayko	754,390	16.35
Aleksey Bryachikhin	Leonard Popov	207,042	4.49
Vladimir Klyuyev	Anatoly Solovyov	197,866	4.29
Valentina Rodionova	Andrey Volkov	173,701	3.76
Against all		190,647	4.13
Invalid ballots		76,954	1.67
Total		4,614,848	100
Registered voters/turnout		6,941,660	66.48

== Tatarstan ==
1991 Tatarstan presidential election
- 12 June 1991
- Turnout: 63.4%
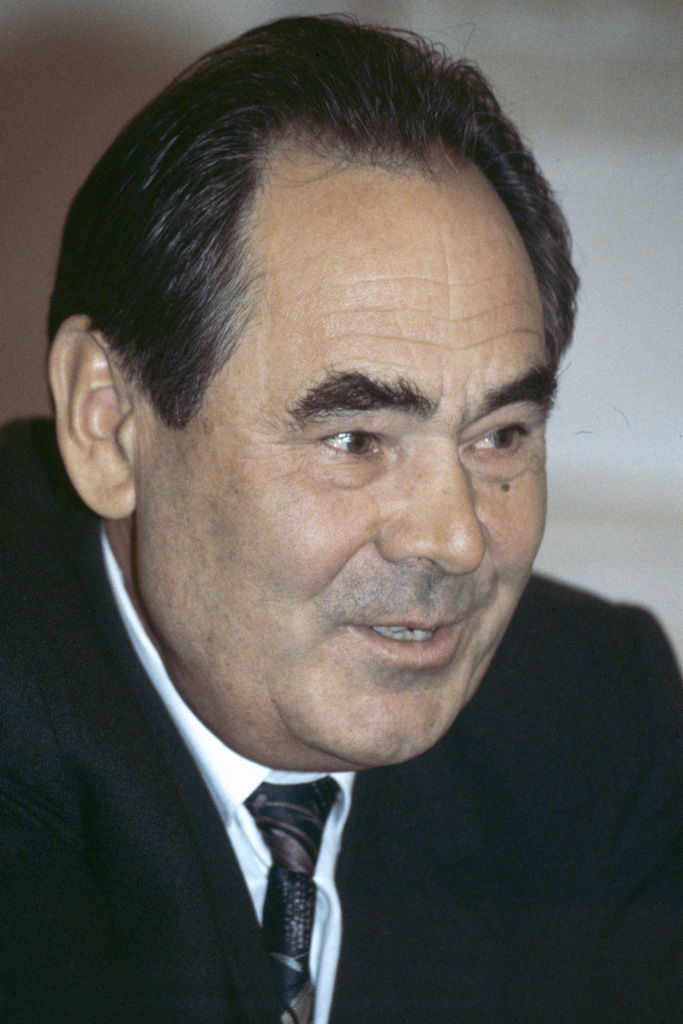

Candidate	Mintimer Shaimiev	Against all
Running mate	Vasily Likhachyov
Percentage	70.6%	29.3%

Presidential elections in Tatarstan were held on 12 June 1991 simultaneously with the election of the president of Russia. Chairman of the Supreme Soviet of Tatar Soviet Socialist Republic Mintimer Shaymiyev ran uncontested, earning 70.6% of the vote. On July 4 Shaymiyev was sworn in as the first president of Tatarstan.

== Tuva ==
1992 Tuvan presidential election
- 15 March 1992
- Turnout: 74.6%
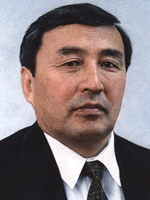
Candidate	Sherig-ool Oorzhak
Running mate	Aleksey Melnikov
Popular vote	107,132
Percentage	83.09%

Presidential elections in Tuva were held on 15 March 1992 despite the moratorium established by the Congress of People's Deputies of Russia. Tuva was proclaimed a sovereign state, the supremacy of Russian laws was denied until 2000 revision of the Constitution of Tuva. In order to be elected, a candidate needed to receive more than 50% of the eligible voters.

Chairman of the Council of Ministers Sherig-ool Oorzhak won with 83.2% of the vote cast. Member of the "People's Party of Sovereign Tuva" Bair Sanchi was his only opponent present on ballot. He collected 9.6% of the vote. Both candidates were of Tuvan origin and their running mates were both ethnic Russians. Oorzhak was sworn in as president on 27 March 1992.

Candidate	Running mate	Votes	%
Sherig-ool Oorzhak	Aleksey Melnikov	107,132	83.09
Bair Sanchi	V. Postnikov		9.6
Against all			
Invalid ballots			
Total		128,928	100
Eligible voters/turnout		172,873	74.58

== Yakutia ==
1991 Yakut presidential election
- 20 December 1991
- Turnout: 74.95%
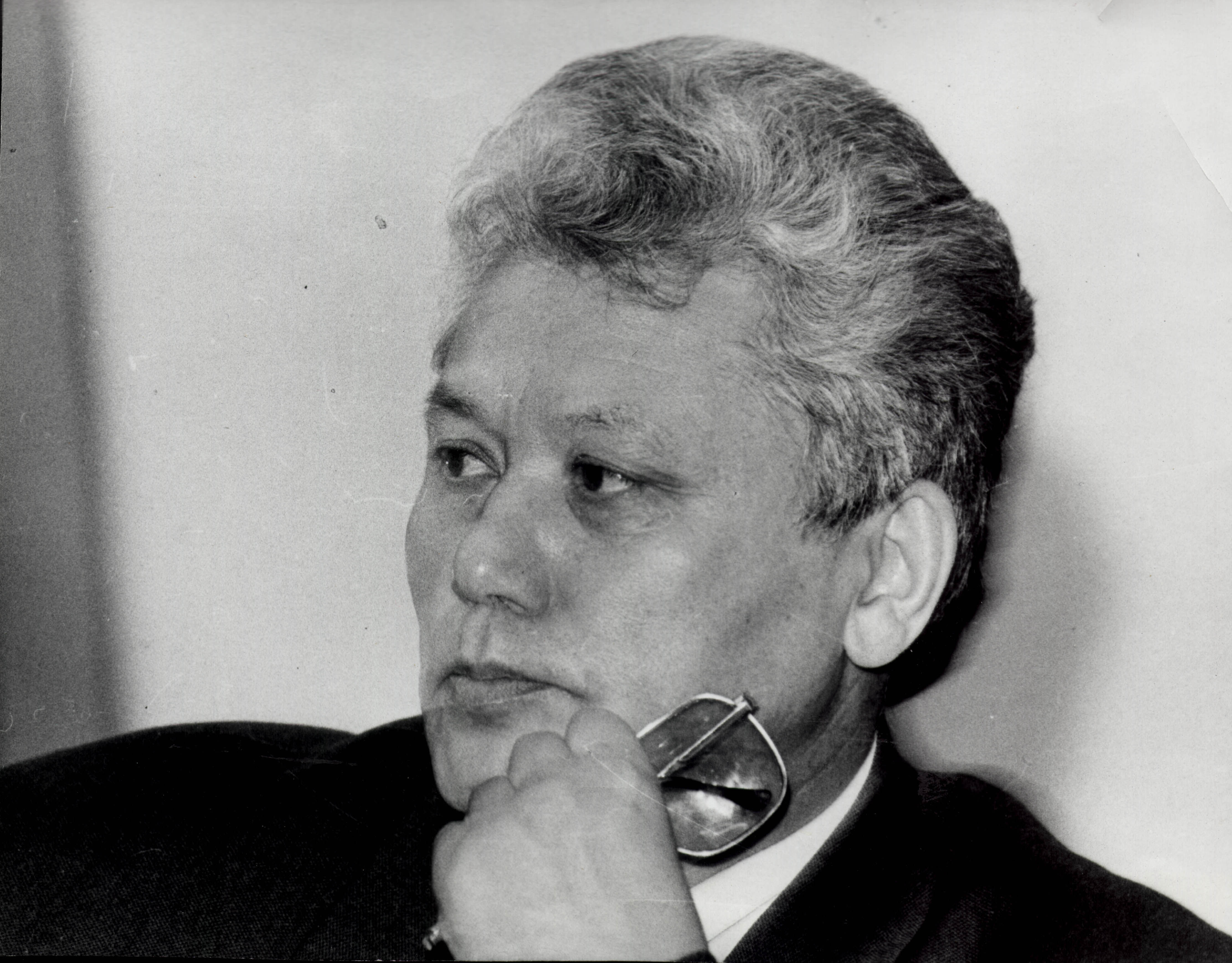

Candidate	Mikhail Nikolayev	Against all
Running mate	Vyacheslav Shtyrov
Popular vote	385,715	70,368
Percentage	76.71%	13.99%
- Election results by district Mikhail Nikolayev Ivan Cherov Against all

Presidential elections in the Yakut–Sakha Soviet Socialist Republic were held on 20 December 1991. Chairman of the Supreme Soviet Mikhail Nikolayev won 3/4 of the vote, running in pair with construction and investment minister Vyacheslav Shtyrov. Deputy Chairman of the Council of Ministers Ivan Cherov was Nikolayev's only opponent. Nikolayev won in every district of the republic except Nizhnekolymsky and Cherov's native Abyysky. He was sworn in on 27 December 1991, and on the next day, the Yakut–Sakha SSR was renamed the Republic of Sakha (Yakutia).

1991 Yakut presidential election
Candidate	Running mate	Votes	%
Mikhail Nikolayev	Vyacheslav Shtyrov	385,715	76.71
Ivan Cherov	Viktor Shemchuk	36,723	7.30
Against all		70,368	13.99
Invalid ballots		10,125	2.01
Total		502,844	100
Registered voters/turnout		670,932	74.95

== See also ==
- Parade of sovereignties

== Sources ==
- Ivanov, Vitaly (2019). Глава субъекта Российской Федерации. История губернаторов [Head of the subject of the Russian Federation. History of governors] (in Russian). ISBN 978-5-907250-14-7.
- Konichenko, Zhanna; Yurchenkov, Valery (2006). На пороге реформ: Общественно-политическая жизнь Мордовии в первой половине 1990-х годов [On threshold of the reforms: Public and Political Life in Mordovia in the first half of the 1990s] (PDF) (in Russian). Саранск: НИИ гуманитарных наук при Правительстве Республики Мордовия. ISBN 5-900029-17-4.
- Kynev, Alexander (2020). Губернаторы в России: между выборами и назначениями [Governors in Russia: Between Elections and Appointments] (in Russian). ISBN 978-5-903135-68-4.
- Moskalenko, Nelly (1992). "Этнополитическая ситуация в Республике Тува /1992 год/" [Ethnopolitical situation in the Republic of Tuva /1992/] (PDF). Institute of Ethnology and Anthropology RAS (in Russian).
