= 2024 Tuva Great Khural election =

- 8 September 2024

All 32 seats in the Great Khural 17 seats needed for a majority
- Turnout: 58.86% ▼16.17 pp
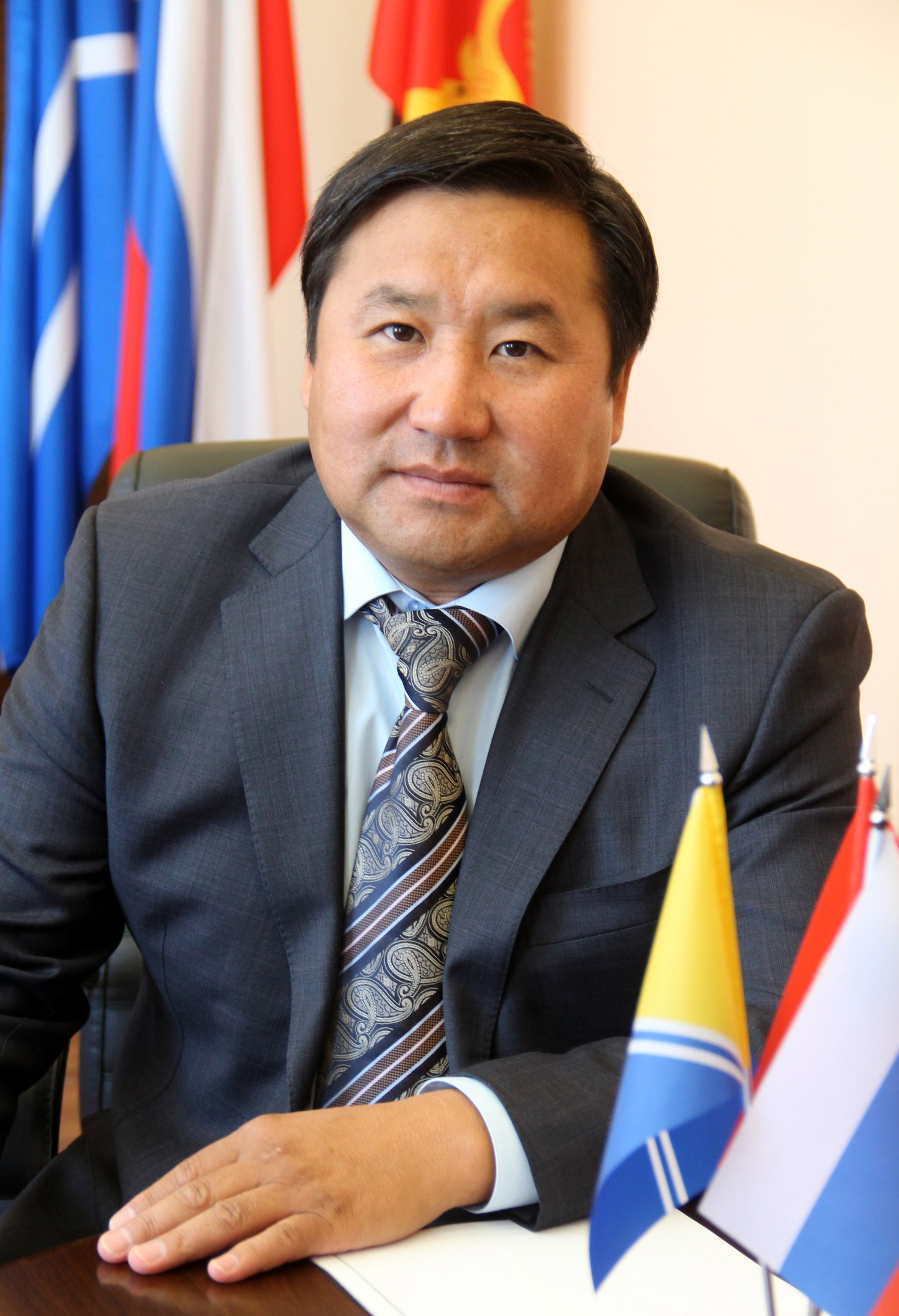

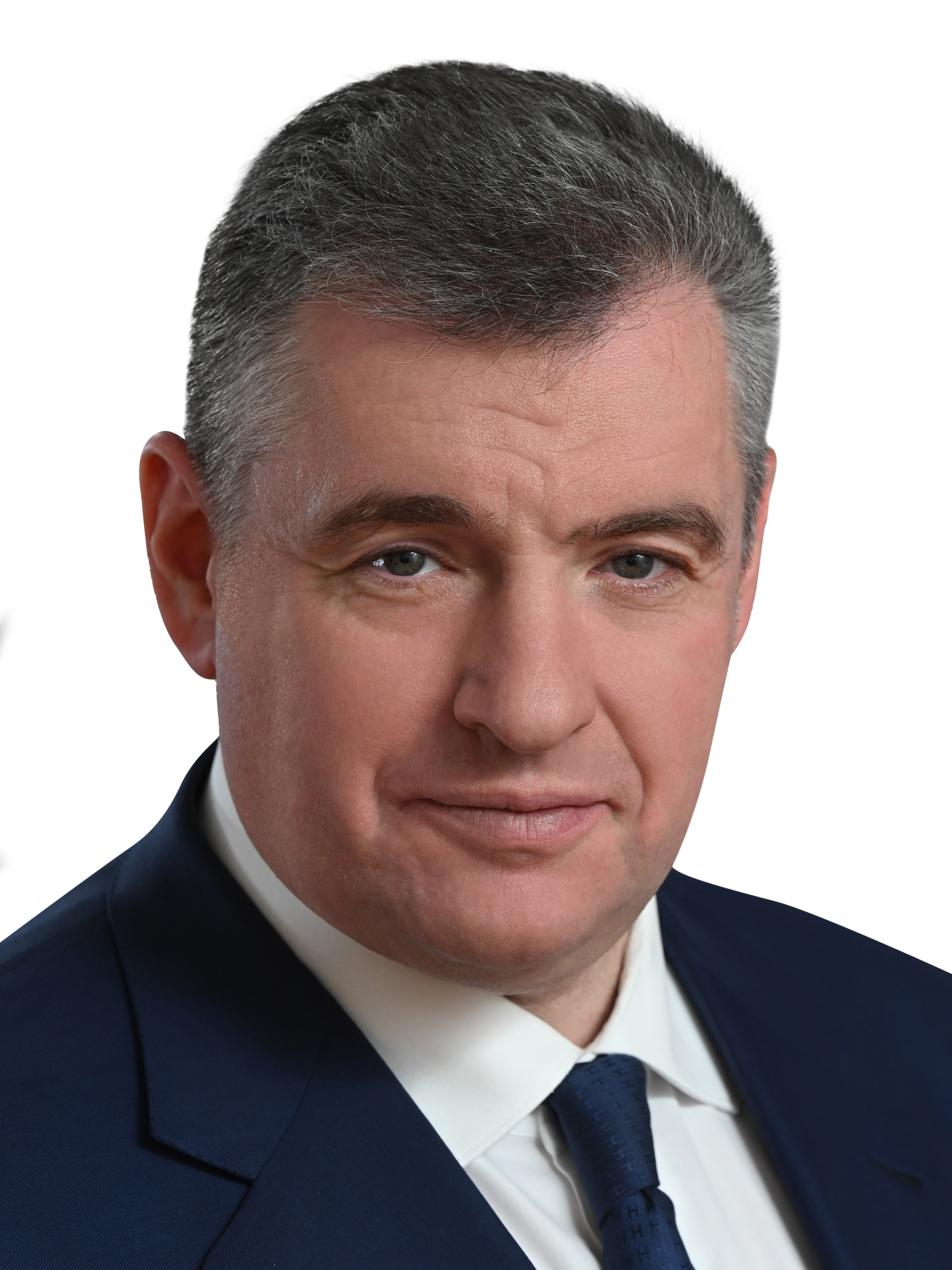
	Majority party	Minority party	Third party
		CPRF	NL
Candidate	Vladislav Khovalyg	Roman Tamoyev	Anatoly Dudko
Party	United Russia	CPRF	New People
Last election	80.13%, 30 seats	3.63%, 0 seats	Did not exist
Seats won	25	2	1
Seat change	▼5	▲2	Did not exist
Popular vote	97,201	6,648	6,578
Percentage	80.01%	5.47%	5.41%
Swing	▲0.23 pp	▲1.84 pp	Did not exist
	Fourth party	Fifth party
		SR-ZP
Candidate	Leonid Slutsky	Vasily Oyun
Party	LDPR	SR-ZP
Last election	7.75%, 2 seats	4.56%, 0 seats
Seats won	1	0
Seat change	▼1	Steady
Popular vote	6,120	3,997
Percentage	5.04%	3.29%
Swing	▼2.71 pp	▼1.27 pp
Chairman before election
Kan-ool Davaa
United Russia
Elected Chairman
Kan-ool Davaa
United Russia

The 2024 Great Khural of the Republic of Tuva election took place on 8 September 2024, on common election day. All 32 seats in the Great Khural were up for reelection.

United Russia retained its overwhelming majority in the Great Khural, winning 80% of the vote, although, losing four seats, including three in single-mandate constituencies. New People and Communist Party of the Russian Federation both entered the Great Khural with one deputy each, while Liberal Democratic Party of Russia narrowly crossed the threshold and lost one of its two seats. For the first time in history four factions would be represented in the Great Khural.

== Electoral system ==
Under current election laws, the Great Khural is elected for a term of five years, with parallel voting. 16 seats are elected by party-list proportional representation with a 5% electoral threshold, with the other half elected in 16 single-member constituencies by first-past-the-post voting. Seats in the proportional part are allocated using the Imperiali quota, modified to ensure that every party list, which passes the threshold, receives at least one mandate.

== Candidates ==
=== Party lists ===
To register regional lists of candidates, parties need to collect 0.5% of signatures of all registered voters in Tuva.

The following parties were relieved from the necessity to collect signatures:

- United Russia
- Communist Party of the Russian Federation
- A Just Russia — Patriots — For Truth
- Liberal Democratic Party of Russia
- New People

No.	Party	Republic-wide list	Candidates	Territorial groups	Status
1	United Russia	Vladislav Khovalyg • Ruslan Tsalikov • Buyan Kuular • Kan-ool Davaa • Sergey Uyusov	62	16	Registered
2	Communist Party	Roman Tamoyev • Lodoy-Damba Kuular • Aydysmaa Chadamba • Svetlana Mongush • Yevgenia Bocharova	33	16	Registered
3	Liberal Democratic Party	Leonid Slutsky • Yulia Arlanmay	39	16	Registered
4	New People	Anatoly Dudko • Nikolay Kongar	34	16	Registered
5	A Just Russia – For Truth	Vasily Oyun	36	16	Registered

New People took part in Tuvan legislative election for the first time, while Communists of Russia, who participated in the last election, did not file.

=== Single-mandate constituencies ===
16 single-mandate constituencies were formed in Tuva. To register candidates in single-mandate constituencies need to collect 3% of signatures of registered voters in the constituency.

Number of candidates in single-mandate constituencies
Party	Candidates	
Party	Nominated	Registered
United Russia	16	15
Liberal Democratic Party	15	15
A Just Russia – For Truth	16	14
Communist Party	15	14
New People	16	15
Independent	10	5
Total	88	78

== Results ==
=== Results by party lists ===
Summary of the 8 September 2024 Great Khural of the Republic of Tuva election results
Party	Party list					Constituency		Total	
Party	Votes	%	±pp	Seats	+/–	Seats	+/–	Seats	+/–
United Russia	97,201	80.01	▲0.23	13	▼1	12	▼3	25	▼5
Communist Party	6,648	5.47	▲1.84	2	▲2	0	Steady	2	▲2
New People	6,578	5.41	New	1	New	0	New	1	New
Liberal Democratic Party	6,120	5.04	▼2.71	1	▼1	0	Steady	1	▼1
A Just Russia — For Truth	4,014	3.29	▼1.27	0	Steady	0	Steady	0	Steady
Independents	–	–	–	–	–	3	▲3	3	▲3
Invalid ballots	949	0.78	▼0.85	—	—	—	—	—	—
Total	121,500	100.00	—	16	Steady	16	Steady	32	Steady
Turnout	121,500	58.86	▼16.17	—	—	—	—	—	—
Registered voters	206,426	100.00	—	—	—	—	—	—	—

Kan-ool Davaa (United Russia) was re-elected as Chairman of the Great Khural. Incumbent Senator Dina Oyun (United Russia) lost the primary and was not a candidate for re-election, however, the newly elected Great Khural could not agree on her replacement as the candidacy of previous frontrunner for the position – former First Deputy Minister of Defense of Russia Ruslan Tsalikov (Independent) – did not even get to the vote. Oyun continued to represent Tuva in the Federation Council until March 27, 2025, when she was appointed director of the Russian House in Buenos Aires. On May 21, 2025, United Russia faction leader in the Great Khural Sholban Kuzhuget was appointed to the Federation Council.

=== Results in single-member constituencies ===
==== District 1 ====
Summary of the 8 September 2024 Great Khural of the Republic of Tuva election in Pravoberezhny constituency No.1
Candidate	Party	Votes	%
Ayas Sanchat	United Russia	3,361	67.83%
Aydysmaa Chadamba	Communist Party	472	9.53%
Arzhaan Saaya	New People	433	8.74%
Eduard Mongush	Liberal Democratic Party	350	7.06%
Nina Shadrina	A Just Russia – For Truth	324	6.54%
Total		4,955	100%

==== District 2 ====
Summary of the 8 September 2024 Great Khural of the Republic of Tuva election in Zapadny constituency No.2
Candidate	Party	Votes	%
Sergey Uyusov	United Russia	4,874	80.50%
Sergey Baykalov	Communist Party	318	5.25%
Irina Badyrgy (incumbent)	A Just Russia – For Truth	291	4.81%
Chaynash Lamazhyk	New People	290	4.79%
Sergey Kravtsov	Liberal Democratic Party	247	4.08%
Total		6,055	100%

==== District 3 ====
Summary of the 8 September 2024 Great Khural of the Republic of Tuva election in Tsentralny constituency No.3
Candidate	Party	Votes	%
Chalym Chuldum-ool	United Russia	3,342	67.61%
Valentin Sennikov	Communist Party	548	11.09%
Artyom Ayyzan	New People	542	10.97%
Valentina Bachevskaya	A Just Russia – For Truth	290	5.87%
Lidia Polevich	Liberal Democratic Party	149	3.01%
Total		4,943	100%

==== District 4 ====
Summary of the 8 September 2024 Great Khural of the Republic of Tuva election in Magistralny constituency No.4
Candidate	Party	Votes	%
Buyan Dongak	United Russia	2,731	65.38%
Svetlana Mongush	Communist Party	475	11.37%
Yulia Arlanmay	Liberal Democratic Party	382	9.15%
Maadyr Kuzhuget	New People	301	7.21%
Yelizaveta Mongush	A Just Russia – For Truth	220	5.27%
Total		4,177	100%

==== District 5 ====
Summary of the 8 September 2024 Great Khural of the Republic of Tuva election in Pervomaysky constituency No.5
Candidate	Party	Votes	%
Andrey Mongush	United Russia	2,614	52.47%
Lodoy-Damba Kuular	Communist Party	1,488	29.87%
Viktor Tsittser	Liberal Democratic Party	432	8.67%
Artyom Kenden	A Just Russia – For Truth	251	5.04%
Kezhik Saryglar	New People	168	3.37%
Total		4,982	100%

==== District 6 ====
Summary of the 8 September 2024 Great Khural of the Republic of Tuva election in Vostochny constituency No.6
Candidate	Party	Votes	%
Rolan Oorzhak	United Russia	3,926	75.79%
Belek Khaplak	New People	325	6.27%
Daniil Grebyonkin	Communist Party	310	5.98%
Sergey Verzakov	A Just Russia – For Truth	289	5.58%
Roman Pochikayev (incumbent)	Liberal Democratic Party	261	5.04%
Total		5,180	100%

==== District 7 ====
Summary of the 8 September 2024 Great Khural of the Republic of Tuva election in Bay-Tayginsky constituency No.7
Candidate	Party	Votes	%
Uzhar-ool Irgit	United Russia	7,907	89.33%
Sergey Salchak	Communist Party	465	5.25%
Arzhaan Konzay	New People	297	3.36%
Eres Sonam	A Just Russia – For Truth	128	1.45%
Total		8,851	100%

==== District 8 ====
Summary of the 8 September 2024 Great Khural of the Republic of Tuva election in Barun-Khemchiksky constituency No.8
Candidate	Party	Votes	%
Ayas Dongak	United Russia	7,844	83.74%
Mengi Mongush	A Just Russia – For Truth	556	5.94%
Adis Dondup	New People	333	3.56%
Batyy Tamdyn-ool	Communist Party	324	3.46%
Anchy Oorzhak	Liberal Democratic Party	207	2.21%
Total		9,367	100%

==== District 9 ====
Summary of the 8 September 2024 Great Khural of the Republic of Tuva election in Dzun-Khemchiksky constituency No.9
Candidate	Party	Votes	%
Baybek Mongush (incumbent)	United Russia	8,761	91.33%
Nina Mongush	Communist Party	318	3.31%
Ochur-Suge Mongush	A Just Russia – For Truth	271	2.82%
Serenmaa Kuzhuget	Liberal Democratic Party	129	1.34%
Orlan Salchak	New People	75	0.78%
Total		9,593	100%

==== District 10 ====
Summary of the 8 September 2024 Great Khural of the Republic of Tuva election in Sut-Kholsky constituency No.10
Candidate	Party	Votes	%
Sayan Ondar	Independent	8,209	77.36%
Oner Ondar	Communist Party	1,552	14.62%
Aybek Mongush	A Just Russia – For Truth	630	5.94%
Cheynesh Ondar	Liberal Democratic Party	122	1.15%
Total		10,612	100%

==== District 11 ====
Summary of the 8 September 2024 Great Khural of the Republic of Tuva election in Ulug-Khemsky constituency No.11
Candidate	Party	Votes	%
Buyan Biche-ool	Independent	6,517	66.34%
Syldys Shivit	United Russia	2,608	26.55%
Ayanmaa Dulush	A Just Russia – For Truth	315	3.21%
Aldyn-Say Mongush	New People	177	1.80%
Alyona Mongush	Liberal Democratic Party	116	1.18%
Total		9,824	100%

==== District 12 ====
Summary of the 8 September 2024 Great Khural of the Republic of Tuva election in Kyzylsky constituency No.12
Candidate	Party	Votes	%
Ayas Monge (incumbent)	United Russia	4,137	77.49%
Aydyn-Monge Ondar	A Just Russia – For Truth	369	6.91%
Sholban Davakay	New People	335	6.27%
Denis Denisov	Communist Party	269	5.04%
Ediski Khertek	Liberal Democratic Party	219	4.10%
Total		5,339	100%

==== District 13 ====
Summary of the 8 September 2024 Great Khural of the Republic of Tuva election in Tandinsky constituency No.13
Candidate	Party	Votes	%
Eres Khuurak (incumbent)	United Russia	10,019	85.55%
Zhanna Oyun	Liberal Democratic Party	601	5.13%
Kamila Oyun	A Just Russia – For Truth	374	3.19%
Dmitry Oyun	Communist Party	370	3.16%
Chechek Oyun	New People	282	2.41%
Total		11,711	100%

==== District 14 ====
Summary of the 8 September 2024 Great Khural of the Republic of Tuva election in Piy-Khemsky constituency No.14
Candidate	Party	Votes	%
Ayana Mongush (incumbent)	United Russia	4,686	64.04%
Rodion Bichi-ool	Independent	1,646	22.50%
Ayas Seren-ool	Communist Party	453	6.19%
Tatyana Kovalnogikh	Liberal Democratic Party	284	3.88%
Ay-Kherel Saaya	New People	122	1.67%
Total		7,317	100%

==== District 15 ====
Summary of the 8 September 2024 Great Khural of the Republic of Tuva election in Kaa-Khemsky constituency No.15
Candidate	Party	Votes	%
Nachyn Chambaldoo	United Russia	5,398	84.11%
Valery Salchak	A Just Russia – For Truth	394	6.14%
Artyom Arlanmay	Liberal Democratic Party	210	3.27%
Nikolay Kongar	New People	203	3.16%
Aydys Mongush	Communist Party	122	1.90%
Total		6,418	100%

==== District 16 ====
Summary of the 8 September 2024 Great Khural of the Republic of Tuva election in Erzinsky constituency No.16
Candidate	Party	Votes	%
Robert Dorzhu	Independent	7,527	91.38%
Shoraan Shombun	United Russia	368	4.47%
Adygzhy Banchyn	Independent	269	3.27%
Sholban Mizhit	New People	40	0.49%
Olcha Mongush	Liberal Democratic Party	15	0.18%
Total		8,237	100%

=== Members ===
Incumbent deputies are highlighted with bold, elected members who declined to take a seat are marked with ~~strikethrough~~.

Constituency
No.	Member	Party
1	Ayas Sanchat	United Russia
2	Sergey Uyusov	United Russia
3	Chalym Chuldum-ool	United Russia
4	Buyan Dongak	United Russia
5	Andrey Mongush	United Russia
6	Rolan Oorzhak	United Russia
7	Uzhar-ool Irgit	United Russia
8	Ayas Dongak	United Russia
9	Baybek Mongush	United Russia
10	Sayan Ondar	Independent
11	Buyan Biche-ool	Independent
12	Ayas Monge	United Russia
13	Eres Khuurak	United Russia
14	Ayana Mongush	United Russia
15	Nachyn Chambaldoo	United Russia
16	Robert Dorzhu	Independent

Party lists
Member	Party
~~Vladislav Khovalyg~~	United Russia
Ruslan Tsalikov	United Russia
~~Buyan Kuular~~	United Russia
Kan-ool Davaa	United Russia
Lyudmila Osmolovskaya	United Russia
Dolaan Kalbak	United Russia
Ulyana Mongush	United Russia
~~Artysh Salchak~~	United Russia
~~Igor Bulavko~~	United Russia
~~Ayana Adygayeva~~	United Russia
~~Anzor Kuular~~	United Russia
Belekmaa Munge	United Russia
Andzhela Kanchyyr-ool	United Russia
Monge Tagba	United Russia
~~Aleksandr Zheltukhin~~	United Russia
Ayan Shirizhik	United Russia
Andrey Listkov	United Russia
Salim Kyzyl-ool	United Russia
Roman Tamoyev	Communist Party
Lodoy-Damba Kuular	Communist Party
Anatoly Dudko	New People
~~Leonid Slutsky~~	Liberal Democratic Party
Yulia Arlanmay	Liberal Democratic Party

== See also ==
- 2024 Russian elections
