= Sholban Kuzhuget =

- Шолбан Кужугет
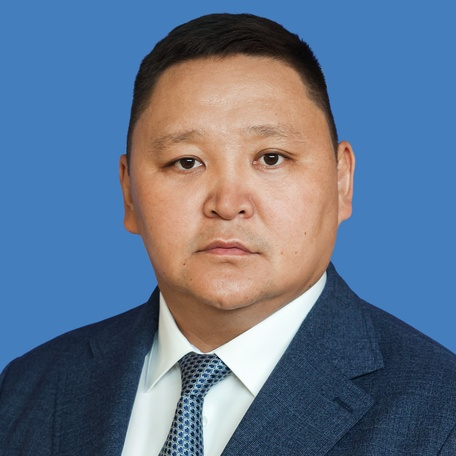

Senator from Tuva
- In office 21 May 2025 – Incumbent
- Preceded by: [[Dina Oyun]]

Personal details
- Born: 20 February 1987 (age 39) Chadan, RSFSR, Soviet Union
- Party: United Russia
- Education: Kemerovo State Medical University

Sholban Artyomovich Kuzhuget (Russian: Шолбан Артёмович Кужугет; born February 20, 1987, in Chadan, Tuva ASSR) is a senator of the Russian Federation and a representative of the Great Khural of Tuva in the Federation Council of Russia, elected on May 21, 2025. He is a member of the Federation Council Committee on Social Policy.

== Biography ==
Born February 20, 1987, in Chadan, Republic of Tuva. Graduated from the Kemerovo State Medical Academy in 2011.

Since 2013, he has worked as a surgeon in the admissions department of Republican Hospital No. 1.

Until 2019, he was the head of the admissions department. He then held the position of Deputy Chief Physician of Hospital No. 1 for organizational and methodological work. In September 2021, he became the head of Republican Hospital No. 2.

In January 2023, he became the director of the territorial Compulsory Medical Insurance Fund. During the COVID-19 pandemic, he prepared medical facilities for emergency operations.

In 2020, he was awarded the Certificate of Honor of the Tuva Ministry of Health.

=== Political career ===
In 2024, he was elected as a deputy of the Tuva Supreme Khural from United Russia.

On May 21, 2025, Kuzhuget was appointed senator, replacing Dina Oyun, who had represented the republic in the Federation Council since 2019 and resigned in March 2025.

In 2024, there was information that former Deputy Minister of Defense of the Russian Federation Ruslan Tsalikov could become a senator from Tuva. He was included in the renewed parliamentary composition of the Tuva Supreme Khural, but his candidacy was not approved for appointment as a senator in the Federation Council.
