= Atner Khuzangai =

Chuvash Russian philologist and literary critic

- Атнер Хусанкай
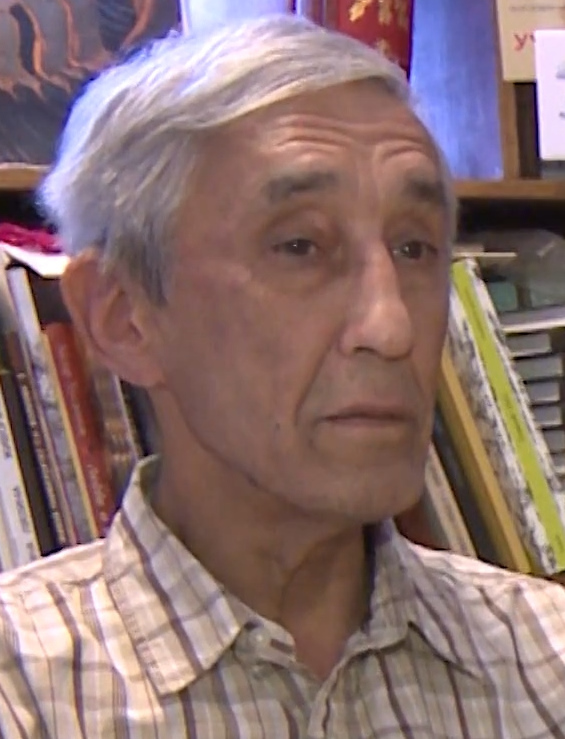
- Atner Khuzangai in 2017
- Born: 8 October 1948 (age 77); Cheboksary, Chuvash ASSR, Russian SFSR, Soviet Union (now Chuvashia, Russia)

Philosophical work
- School: Chuvash philology
- Institutions: Saint Petersburg State University, Institute of Oriental Studies of the Russian Academy of Sciences

Atner Petrovich Khuzangai (Note: Russian: Атнер Петрович Хузангай, Chuvash: Атнер Петӗр Хусанкай ывӑлӗ, romanized: Atner Petĕr Husankai ywălĕ) (born 8 October 1948) is a Chuvash Russian philologist, literary critic, publicist, leader of the Chuvash national movement, first President, now honorary President of the Chuvash National Congress. Member of the Chuvash Writers' Union (1987).

== Biography ==
Atner Khuzangai was born in the family of poet Pyotr Khuzangai (1907–1970) and actress Vera Kuzmina (1923–2021).

He graduated from the Oriental faculty of Leningrad State University (specialization is Arabic philology and postgraduate studies) and postgraduate study from the Institute of Oriental studies of the Academy of Sciences of the Soviet Union. He trained as a military interpreter in Egypt from 1970 to 1971. In 1977, he was declared a Candidate of Philological Sciences.

Head of the Department of linguistics of the Chuvash State Institute of Humanities.

In the late 1980s and early 1990s, Khuzangai was an active figure of the Chuvash national cultural movement. He was a deputy of the Supreme Council of the Chuvash Republic and chairman of the standing committee on culture. He was a two-time candidate for President of the Chuvash Republic in 1991 and 1993. Between 1992 and 1997, he was president of the Chuvash National Congress, established on his initiative. From 1997 to 2002, he was also the first Vice-President of the General Assembly of the Unrepresented Nations and Peoples Organization.

== Proceedings ==
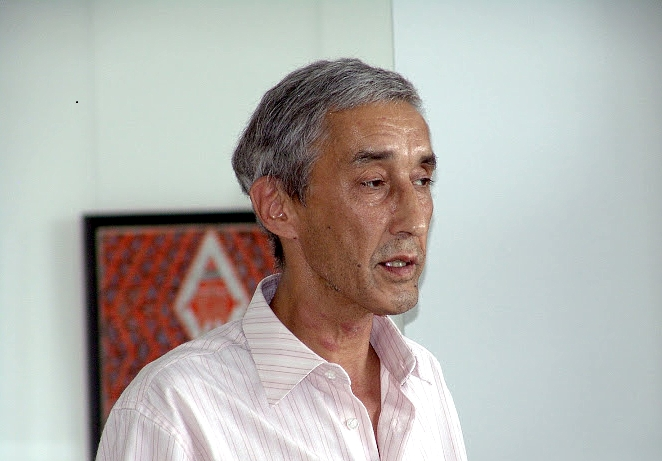
Atner Khoosanguy

- Atner Khoosanguy, Поиск слова. Литературно-критические статьи. — Чебоксары: Чувашгосиздат., 1987. 191 с.
- Atner Khoosanguy, Поэт Айги и художники (Опыт философской интерпретации поэтического и художественного сознания. — Чебоксары, 1998.
- Atner Khoosanguy, Текст, метатексты и путешествия. — Чебоксары: Руссика, 2003. 387 с.
- Atner Khoosanguy, Без иллюзий: мой временник. — Чебоксары: Чуваш. кн. изд-во, 2017. 255 с. ISBN 978-5-7670-2615-9
