= 2002 Russian gubernatorial elections =

- 13 January – 27 October 2002

12 Heads of Federal Subjects from 89
- 2002 Russian regional elections: Gubernatorial Gubernatorial (of another subject) Gubernatorial and legislative Legislative

Gubernatorial elections in 2002 took place in twelve regions of the Russian Federation.

== Race summary ==
Federal subject	Incumbent	Incumbent since	Election day	Candidates	Result
Altai Republic	see 2001 elections		6 January (runoff)	see 2001 elections	
Sakha (Yakutia)	see 2001 elections		13 January (runoff)	see 2001 elections	
Adygea	Aslan Dzharimov	1992	13 January	✓ Khazret Sovmen 68.89%; Aslan Dzharimov 10.15%; Nina Konovalova 9.64%; Mikhail Chernichenko 4.39%; Aslan Tkhakushinov 2.06%	Incumbent lost re-election. New president elected.
Kabardino-Balkaria	Valery Kokov	1992	13 January	✓ Valery Kokov 87.18%; Mukhamed Batyrov 8.39%	Incumbent re-elected.
North Ossetia	Alexander Dzasokhov	1998	27 January	✓ Alexander Dzasokhov 56.05%; Stanislav Suanov 29.07%	Incumbent re-elected.
Tuva	Sherig-ool Oorzhak	1992	17 March	✓ Sherig-ool Oorzhak 53.54%; Sholban Kara-ool 29.07%; Aleksandr Kashin (SPS) 7.53%; Vyacheslav Darzha 6.86%	Incumbent re-elected.
Ingushetia (snap election)	Ruslan Aushev (resigned); Akhmed Malsagov (acting)	1993	7 April (first round)	Alikhan Amirkhanov 33.09%; Murat Zyazikov 19.11%; Mukharbek Aushev 17.04%; Akhmed Malsagov 13.56%; Belan Khamchiyev 8.68%	New president elected to a vacant position.
Ingushetia (snap election)	Ruslan Aushev (resigned); Akhmed Malsagov (acting)	1993	28 April (runoff)	✓ Murat Zyazikov 53.13%; Alikhan Amirkhanov 43.19%	New president elected to a vacant position.
Lipetsk Oblast	Oleg Korolyov	1998	14 April	✓ Oleg Korolyov 73.06%; Igor Polosin 5.13%; Against all 13.38%	Incumbent re-elected.
Penza Oblast	Vasily Bochkaryov	1998	14 April	✓ Vasily Bochkaryov 45.45%; Viktor Ilyukhin (CPRF) 40.95%; Against all 5.96%	Incumbent re-elected.
Karelia	Sergey Katanandov	1998	28 April	✓ Sergey Katanandov 53.45%; Artur Myaki (SPS) 14.05%; Vasily Popov (Yabloko) 10.37%; Boris Tyukov (CPRF) 7.48%; Against all 10.72%	Incumbent re-elected.
Smolensk Oblast	Aleksandr Prokhorov	1998	19 May	✓ Viktor Maslov 40.51%; Aleksandr Prokhorov 34.40%; Ivan Averchenkov 8.57%; Valery Fateyev 3.05%; Against all 9.28%	Incumbent lost re-election. New governor elected.
Buryatia	Leonid Potapov	1994	23 June	✓ Leonid Potapov (UR support) 68.79%; Bato Semyonov (UR dissident) 23.50%	Incumbent re-elected.
Krasnoyarsk Krai (snap election)	Alexander Lebed (died in office); Nikolay Ashlapov (acting)	1998	8 September (first round)	Aleksandr Uss 27.62%; Alexander Khloponin 25.25%; Sergey Glazyev 21.44%; Pyotr Pimashkov 14.30%	New governor elected to a vacant position.
Krasnoyarsk Krai (snap election)	Alexander Lebed (died in office); Nikolay Ashlapov (acting)	1998	22 September (runoff)	✓ Alexander Khloponin 48.07%; Aleksandr Uss 41.83%; Against all 9.15%	New governor elected to a vacant position.
Kalmykia	Kirsan Ilyumzhinov	1993	20 October (first round)	Kirsan Ilyumzhinov 47.26%; Baatr Shondzhiyev 13.61%; Nikolay Ochirov 12.76%; Vitaly Daginov 8.63%	Incumbent re-elected.
Kalmykia	Kirsan Ilyumzhinov	1993	27 October (runoff)	✓ Kirsan Ilyumzhinov 57.21%; Baatr Shondzhiyev 38.04%	Incumbent re-elected.

== Krasnoyarsk Krai ==
2002 Krasnoyarsk Krai gubernatorial election
- 8 September 2002 (first round); 22 September 2002 (second round)
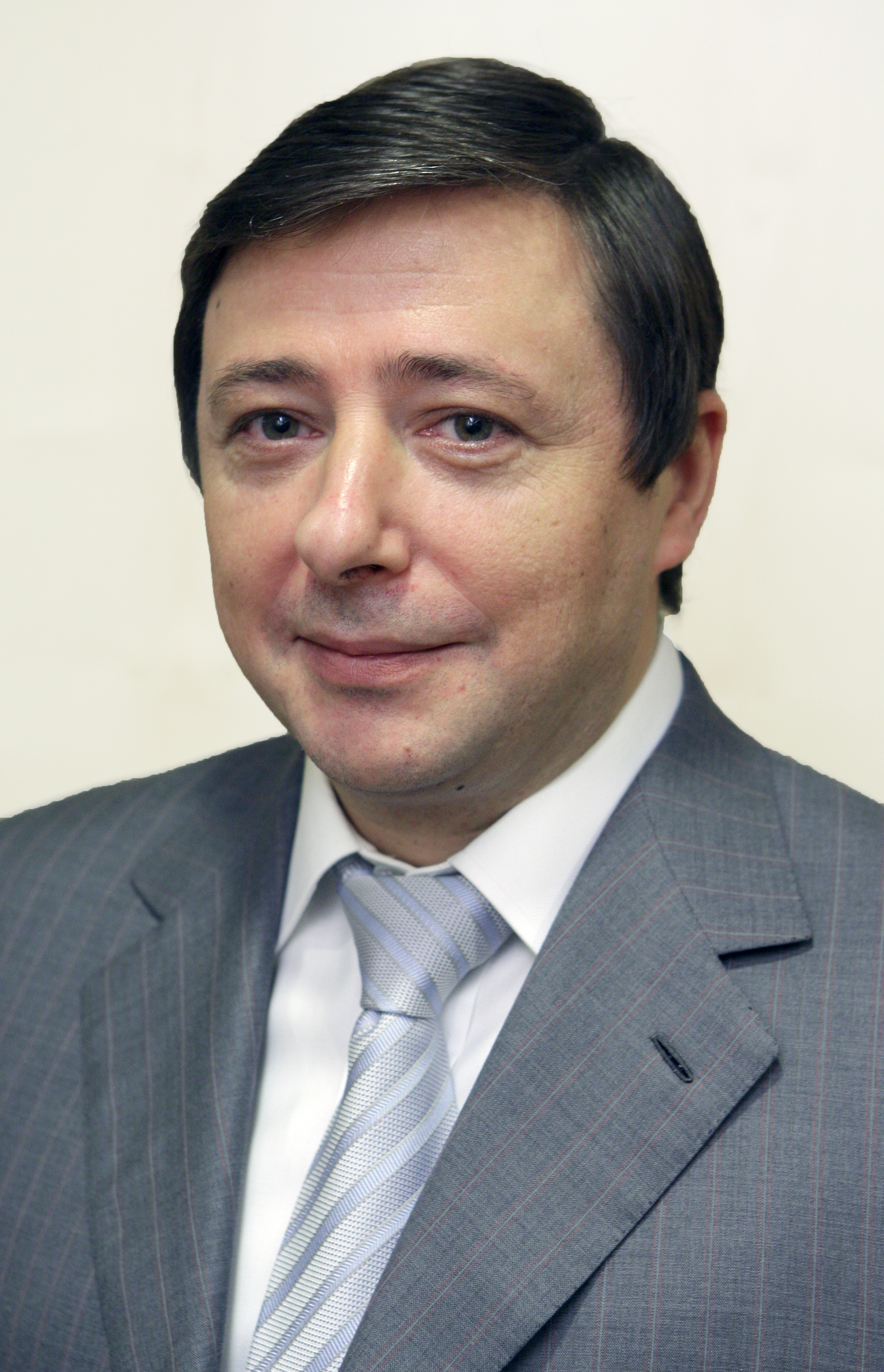

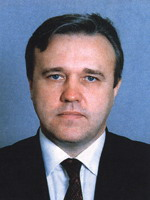
Candidate	Alexander Khloponin	Aleksandr Uss
Popular vote	496,415	431,924
Percentage	48.07%	41.83%
- Uss: 20–30% 30–40% 40–50% Khloponin: 20–30% 30–40% 40–50% 50–60% 60–70% 70–80% 80–90% Glazyev: 20–30% 30–40% 40–50% Pimashkov: 20–30% Khloponin: 30–40% 40–50% 50–60% 60–70% 70–80% 80–90% >90% Uss: 40–50% 50–60% 60–70% 70–80%
Governor before election
Nikolay Ashlapov (acting)
Elected Governor
Alexander Khloponin

Snap gubernatorial election was held in Krasnoyarsk Krai on 8 September 2002, to elect the governor of Krasnoyarsk Krai. As no candidate received a majority, a second round was held on 22 September 2002, won by Alexander Khloponin, then-governor of Taymyr Autonomous Okrug.

=== Background ===
From June 1998, Alexander Lebed was the governor of Krasnoyarsk Krai. On 22 April 2002 he died in a helicopter crash. Nikolay Ashlapov became interim governor until the new gubernatorial elections were held in September 2002.

A total of 32 people submitted documents, 16 of them were registered. Later, the Head of Khakassia and the brother of the late governor, Alexei Lebed, withdrew and another candidate was removed from the ballot by the election authorities. Thus, 14 candidates participated in the elections.

The elections were held in two rounds. In the first round, none of the candidates managed to gain more than 50% of the vote. Alexander Uss came the first, gaining 27.6% of the votes, Alexander Khloponin was second with 25%. Sergei Glazyev and Pyotr Pimashkov received fewer votes and did not qualify for the second round.

=== Results ===
Candidate	First round		Second round	
Candidate	Votes	%	Votes	%
Aleksandr Uss	286,882	27.92	431,924	42.23
Alexander Khloponin	262,251	25.52	496,415	48.53
Sergey Glazyev	222,650	21.67		
Pyotr Pimashkov	148,517	14.45		
Artyom Tarasov	29,010	2.82		
Igor Zakharov	10,138	0.99		
Anatoly Gridyushkin	6,151	0.60		
Aleftina Makovoz	2,492	0.24		
Igor Priymak	1,687	0.16		
Oleg Ulyanov	1,678	0.16		
Andrey Zberovsky	1,501	0.15		
Vladimir Yurchenko	1,279	0.12		
German Sterligov	1,006	0.10		
Vasily Zhurko	529	0.05		
Against all	51,847	5.05	94,469	9.24
Total	1,027,618	100.00	1,022,808	100.00
Valid votes	1,027,618	98.95	1,022,808	99.05
Invalid/blank votes	10,869	1.05	9,818	0.95
Total votes	1,038,487	100.00	1,032,626	100.00
Registered voters/turnout	2,202,219	47.16	2,207,960	46.77

=== Aftermath ===
On 29 September 2002, a week after the second round, the electoral commission of Krasnoyarsk Krai declared elections invalid following numerous complaints from the headquarters of the losing candidate Alexander Uss. The commission considered that the free vote was impeded by the use of administrative resources by candidates, bribery and deception of voters, spread of fake agitation materials and spending the campaign funds for another purposes. It was also announced at the meeting that it is not possible to determine the vote of about 200,000 people.

Alexander Uss said that for him "the election is over" and he does not intend to participate in re-vote, scheduled in March 2003, he is not going to go to court and advises Khloponin to do the same. Uss also stated that "it is high time to stop electing governors by open ballot and henceforth appoint them directly from the Kremlin". On the same day, the leader of the Liberal Democratic Party, Vladimir Zhirinovsky, came up with a similar idea, even saying that LDPR was recalling their representative from the Central Election Commission, stating that the entire Russian electoral system is so rotten that a decent person will no longer get involved with it.

On 1 October the court ruled that the decision of the regional electoral commission to annul the results was unauthorized and, in fact, officially recognized that Khloponin became the winner. Two days later, the regional election commission complied with the court's decision, however, filing a cassation appeal against it. On the same day, Russian president Vladimir Putin signed a decree, appointing Khloponin the acting governor of Krasnoyarsk Krai. His inauguration was held on October 17. Month later, on November 19, 2002, the Supreme Court of Russia rejected the cassation appeal of the election commission of Krasnoyarsk Krai and confirmed the legality of the election of Alexander Khloponin as the governor.
