= List of presidents of the Chamber of Representatives of the Great Khural of Tuva =

This is a list of presidents (Speakers) of the Chamber of Representatives of the Great Khural of Tuva:

Name	Entered office	Left office
Dandyr-ool Oorzhak	June 2002	October 2006
Khonuk-ool Mongush	October 2006	October 21, 2010
