= 1991 Leningrad municipal election =

Soviet election and name change referendum

The 1991 Leningrad municipal elections took place on June 12, 1991 in the city of Leningrad (modern-day Saint Petersburg), located in the then-Soviet republic of Russia. The elections included the city's first popular mayoral election and a non-binding referendum on whether to change the city's name to its historic name of "Saint Petersburg". The elections coincided with the 1991 Russian presidential election.

Roughly two-thirds of the city's approximately three million eligible voters participated in the election.

== Background ==
The election coincided with the first (and ultimately only) round of the 1991 Russian presidential election, which was won by Boris Yeltsin. The coinciding presidential election was first-ever popular election of a Russian leader. Also coinciding with the election was a mayoral election in Moscow and a presidential election in Tatarstan. Additionally coinciding was a referendum in Sverdlovsk on renaming their city to its former name of "Yekaterinburg".

The election was the first ever popular election of a city administrator in the city's history.

== Mayoral election ==
1991 Leningrad mayoral election
- 12 June 1991
- Turnout: 64.89%
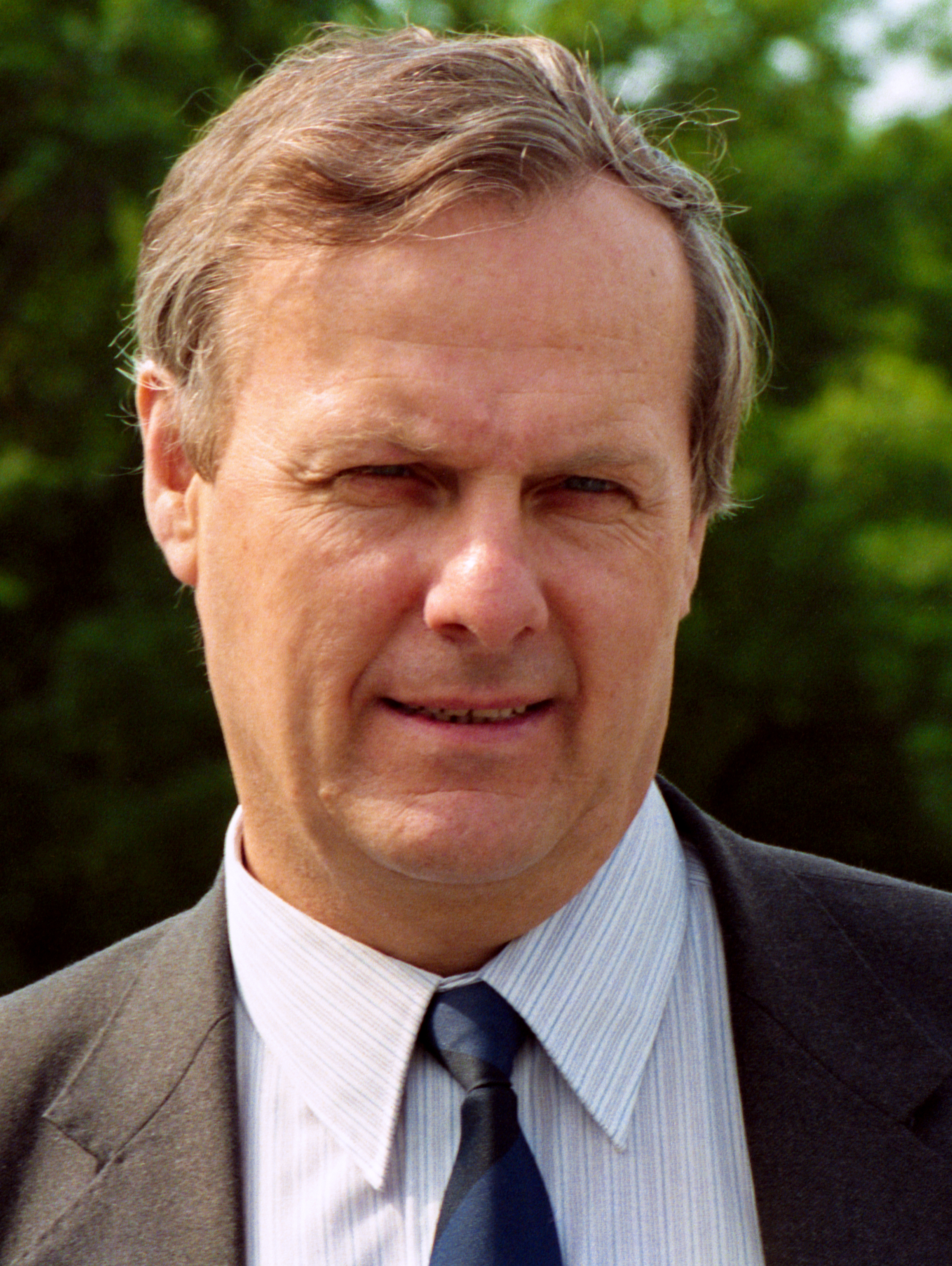

Candidate	Anatoly Sobchak	Yuri Sevenard
Running mate	Vyacheslav Shcherbakov	Yury Denisov
Popular vote	1,623,659	631,367
Percentage	66.13%	25.72%
- Winning candidate by district
Chairman of the City Council before election
Anatoly Sobchak
Independent
Elected Mayor
Anatoly Sobchak
Independent

Chairman of the Leningrad City Council Anatoly Sobchak (an independent politician) was elected the city's first popularly elected mayor, winning 65% of the vote against Communist city council member Yuri Sevenard.

Before the election, Sobchak had been the chairperson of the Leningrad City Council.

Sobchak was considered to be a liberal. He was a former member of the Communist Party, but had left the party the previous year. Sobchak was considered a like-minded reformer to Yeltsin, and was politically associated with Yeltsin. His victory, along with the similarly strong victory (also over 65%) of fellow Yeltsin ally Gavriil Popov in the coinciding Moscow mayoral election, were a boon to Yeltsin's political mandate.

Sobchak and allies had called for more tractors and fewer tanks to be produced at Soviet government-operated defense plants in the Leningrad area. He also hoped to see municipally owned enterprises of the city privatized through methods included outright sales, long-term leases, and the creation of joint-stock companies owned by employees. He also supported making the city a free economic zone which would lure foreign manufacturing and service companies to the area through tax concessions and exemptions from customs duties. In May 1991, Boris Yeltsin gave his support to this plan.

Sobchak, during his campaign, supported renaming the city to its former name of "Saint Petersburg". He also called for removing Lenin from his mausoleum in Moscow's Red Square, saying that Lenin should be buried in Leningrad/Saint Petersburg alongside his mother and sister.

The most significant candidate that Sobchak faced was Yuri Sevenard, the Communist Party's candidate.

Candidate	Running mate	Results	%
Anatoly Sobchak	Vyacheslav Shcherbakov	1,623,659	66.13
Yuri Sevenard	Yury Denisov	631,367	25.72
Against all		175,532	7.15
Invalid ballots		25,258	1.03
Total		2,455,089	100
Registered voters/turnout		3,783,284	64.89

== Name change referendum ==
55% of voters supported restoring the city's name to "Saint Petersburg". The referendum was non-binding, as only the Communist-dominated national parliament had the authority to implement a name-change.

When the city was founded in 1703, it had been known by the name "Saint Petersburg", but had been renamed to "Petrograd" in 1914 and again to "Leningrad" in 1924, five days after the death of the inaugural leader of the Soviet Union, Vladimir Lenin. After exhaustive lobbying by anti-Communist groups, the Leningrad City Council agreed to hold a referendum on changing the city's name to "Saint Petersburg".

Debate over the name-change, ahead of the referendum, touched on the very value of Soviet identity. Bolsheviks, communists, and many war veterans opposed a name change as both attacking the ideals that had shaped their lives, and as an insult towards the suffering endured in the Battle of Leningrad. The prospect of renaming drew particular anger from many survivors of the Siege of Leningrad. Contrarily, reformers, intellectuals, Russian nationalists, and opponents of Communism felt that the name Saint Petersburg reflected Russian excellence and favored dropping the name "Leningrad", which they associated with a system they felt had been repressive. The greatest opposition was reportedly from voters over 65 years old, while the greatest support was from voters under the age of 30.

Alexei II, Patriarch of the Russian Orthodox Church, supported the name change. Other supporters of the name-change included then-city councilman Dmitry Mezentsev.

Soviet President Mikhail Gorbachev had spoken out ahead of the referendum against the prospect of renaming the city, declaring that "there are neither moral nor political grounds" to rename the city. The June 1991 elections in Russia were seen as a blow to Gorbachev, also seeing the election of Yeltsin (whose coalition was critical of Gorbachev's policies) as president. John Rettie of The Guardian suggested that Gorbachev's remarks opposing renaming may have encouraged voters to actually vote in support of renaming the city. Deputy Mayor of Leningrad Vyacheslav Scherbakov also spoke against the potential name change.

Among the arguments local Communists, led by Leningrad party leader Boris Gidaspov, used against the name-change was that it would be very costly to change the city's name on signs, stationery and equipment. They also argued that it would dishonor survivors of the Siege of Leningrad.

Renown Russian author Aleksandr Solzhenitsyn argued that all Russians, not just Leningrad residents, should be allowed to vote on the matter of changing the city's name. He also expressed concern that the name "Petersburg" was in violation of linguistic and historical traditions, suggesting Petrograd and Svyato-Petrograd as Russified alternatives to the more Germanic "Petersburg".

The 55% result in support of renaming the city was not predicted by pre-election polling. Political observers had believed it might fail to pass. Pre-election polls had shown the electorate near evenly-split, showing the referendum likely to be defeated by a narrow margin.

In its similar coinciding referendum, the residents of Sverdlovsk voted in support of renaming their city to its historical name of "Yekaterinburg".

The Associated Press called the result, "a strong blow to the legacy of Lenin". Scott Shane of The Baltimore Sun called the result, "potent symbol of the popular rejection of the 1917 revolution and its legacy."

The name of the city was reinstated as "Saint Petersburg" later that year.

Name change referendum
Option	Results	%
Support name-change	1,345,852	54.86
Oppose name-change	1,047,216	42.68
Invalid ballots	60,344	2.46
Total	2,453,412	100
Registered voters/turnout	3,792,370	64.69
