= Mayor of Kyzyl =

Head of the local government of Kyzyl, Tuva, Russia

- Flag of Kyzyl
- Incumbent; Karim Sagaan-ool since 1 November 2018
- Term length: 5 years
- Website: https://www.mkyzyl.ru/officials/

The Mayor of Kyzyl (Russian: Глава города Кызы́ла, romanized: Glava goroda Kyzyla) is the head of the Government of Kyzyl, Tyvan Republic, Russia. The current incumbent is Karim Baylak-oolovich Sagaan-ool.

== See also ==
- Kyzyl
- Russia
- Tyva Republic
- Head of the Republic of Tuva
- Karim Baylak-oolovich Sagaan-ool
