= Karim Baylak-oolovich Sagaan-ool =

Politician

Karim Sagan-ool
- Карим Сагаан-оол

Mayor of Kyzyl
- Incumbent
- Assumed office 1 November 2018
- Preceded by: Vladislav Khovalyg

Personal details
- Born: 20 November 1977 (age 48) Chaa-Khol, Ulug-Khemsky District, Tuvan ASSR, Russian SFSR, Soviet Union
- Party: United Russia
- Children: 4

Karim Baylak-oolovich Sagan-ool (Russian: Карим Байлак-оолович Сагаан-оол; born 20 November 1977) is a Russian scientist and politician, currently serving as the Mayor of Kyzyl.

== Personal life ==
He is married and has three daughters and one son.

== See also ==
- Kyzyl
- Mayor of Kyzyl
- Tuvan Republic
- Vladislav Khovalyg
