= Vladislav Khovalyg =

Head of the Republic of Tuva

- Владислав Ховалыг
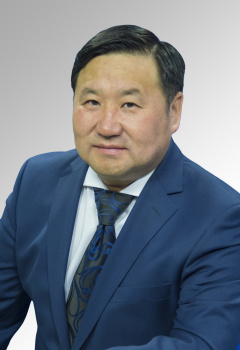
- Official portrait, 2021

3rd Head of the Republic of Tuva
- Incumbent
- Assumed office 7 April 2021
- Preceded by: Sholban Kara-ool

Mayor of Kyzyl
- In office 20 July 2008 – 1 November 2018
- Preceded by: Dmitry Dongak
- Succeeded by: Karim Sagaan-ool

Minister of Land and Property Relations of the Republic of Tuva
- In office 12 April 2007 – 30 July 2008

Personal details
- Born: Vladislav Tovarishchtayovich Khovalyg; 24 December 1967 (age 58) Teeli, Tuvan ASSR, Russian SFSR, Soviet Union
- Party: United Russia

Vladislav Tovarishchtayovich Khovalyg (Russian: Владислав Товарищтайович Ховалыг; Tuvan: Владислав Товарищтай оглу Ховалыг; born on 24 December 1967) is a Russian politician who is currently the 3rd Head of the Republic of Tuva since 7 April 2021. He is a member of United Russia, the largest and ruling party of Russia.

He served as the Mayor of Kyzyl from 30 July 2008 to 1 November 2018. He also served as the Minister of Land and Property Relations of the Republic of Tuva from 2007 to 2008.

== Biography ==
Vladislav Khovalyg was born in the village of Teeli, on 24 December 1967. He is of Tuvan ethnic background.

From 1986 to 1988 he served in the ranks of the Armed Forces of the Soviet Union.

In 1992, he graduated from Krasnoyarsk State University with a degree in jurisprudence, and in 2006 - from the Russian Academy of Public Administration under the President of Russia with a degree in Crisis Management.

After graduating from the university, he began to work in government bodies, becoming the chief specialist on legal issues of the State Committee for Property of the Republic of Tuva.

Then, from 1994 to 2004, he headed the territorial body of the Federal Service of the Russia for Financial Recovery and Bankruptcy in Tuva. He later moved to the Ministry of Finance of the Republic of Tuva, where he successively held the positions of the head of the department and the head of the department.

From April 2007 to July 2008, he was the Minister of Land and Property Relations of the Republic of Tuva.

On 30 July 2008, Khovalyg headed the Kyzyl city administration and as the head of the city. He served two terms in this post. He transferred his powers of mayor to Karim Sagaan-ool on 1 November 2018.

From 9 November 2018 to 7 April 2021, he was the General Director of Tyvaenergosbyt.

=== Acting Head of the Republic of Tuva ===
On 7 April 2021, Russian President Vladimir Putin signed a decree appointing Khovalyg as interim head of the Republic of Tuva to replace Sholban Kara-ool, who had retired.

On June 20, 2021, the regional branch of the United Russia party nominated Khovalyg to run in the 2021 Russian regional elections for head of the republic. He won the 2021 Tuva head election and took office on September 28, 2021.

== Awards ==
- Gratitude letter from the President of the Russian Federation (2012)
- Honorary Certificate of the Head of the Republic of Tuva (2013, 2018)
- Medal «For Contribution to the Development of the City of Kyzyl» (2017)
- Order of Friendship (2022) — for great contribution to the socio-economic development of the Republic of Tyva

== Sanctions ==
In February 2023, the Office of Foreign Assets Control of the United States Department of the Treasury added Khovalyg to the Specially Designated Nationals and Blocked Persons List due to his involvement in the enforcement of the conscription of Russian citizens in response to the 2022 mobilization order during the Russian invasion of Ukraine.

== Family ==
He is married and has two children.

== See also ==
- Tyva Republic
- Head of the Republic of Tyva
- Russia
- Mayor of Kyzyl
- Karim Baylak-oolovich Sagaan-ool
- Kyzyl
