= List of presidents of the Legislative Chamber of the Great Khural of Tuva =

List of presidents

This is a list of presidents (Speakers) of the Legislative Chamber of the Great Khural of Tuva from 2002:

Name	Entered office	Left office
Vasily Oyun	June 2002	May 27, 2009
Vitaly Valkov	May 27, 2009	November 6, 2009
Boris Balch-ool	November 6, 2009	March 9, 2010
Vitaly Valkov	March 9, 2010	October 21, 2010
