= Nikolay Ashlapov =

Russian politician

- Николай Ашлапов
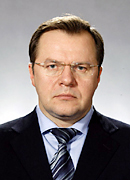

Deputy Minister of Regional Development of Russia
- In office 15 July 2008 – September 2009
- Minister: Dmitry Kozak; Viktor Basargin

Member of the State Duma
- In office 29 December 2003 – 5 April 2006

Governor of Krasnoyarsk Krai (acting)
- In office 28 April 2002 – 3 October 2002
- Preceded by: Alexander Lebed
- Succeeded by: Alexander Khloponin

Personal details
- Born: Nikolay Ivanovich Ashlapov; 23 January 1962 (age 64) Suchkovo, Bolsheuluysky District, Krasnoyarsk Krai, RSFSR, Soviet Union
- Party: United Russia

Nikolay Ivanovich Ashlapov (Russian: Николай Иванович Ашлапов; born 23 January 1962) is a Russian politician who had most recently previously served as the Deputy Minister of Regional Development from 2008 to 2009. He had also served as a member of the State Duma of the fourth convocation from 2003 to 2005. Ashlapov had also been the acting Governor of Krasnoyarsk Krai in 2002.

He is a member of the United Russia party. He had been the chairman of the board of directors of Independent Generation Company. As of August 2014, he is the president of CJSC "AMD".

== Biography ==
Nikolay Ashlapov was born on 23 January 1962, in the village of Suchkovo, Bolsheuluysky District, Krasnoyarsk Krai.

From 1979 to 198, he studied at technical school No. 9 in Achinsk.

From 1980 to 1985, he studied at the Krasnoyarsk Polytechnic Institute, Faculty of Heat and Power Engineering, specialty engineer – industrial heat and power engineering.

From 1984 to 1985, at the Achinsk alumina refinery, he was a foreman in the boiler shop of a thermal power plant in the direction of the MCM of the Soviet Union.

From 1985 to 1993, he was the Secretary of the Komsomol Committee "AGK", director of the youth center "Mercury", later renamed the production and commercial company "Mercury".

From 1993 to 1995, he was the General Director of the Market company, later renamed the industrial and financial company Svyatogor.

From 1995 to 1998, he was the chairman of the board of directors of Achinsk Alumina Refinery OJSC.

From 1998 to 1999, Ashlapov had been the acting head of Achinsk.

From 1999 to 2000, he was the chairman of the board of directors of Achinsk Alumina Refinery OJSC again.

From 2000 to 2001, he had been a representative of the Russian Aluminum company in the Krasnoyarsk Krai.

From 26 February 2002 to 29 April 2002, he was the First Deputy Governor of the Krasnoyarsk Krai.

On 28 April 2002, Ashlapov became the acting Governor of Krasnoyarsk Krai after the death of Governor Alexander Lebed in a plane crash. On 3 October, he officially left office for the elected governor, Alexander Khloponin.

On 14 October 2002, he became a representative of Eurosibenergo LLC in the Krasnoyarsk Krai.

On 26 December 2002, he became the chairman of the Union of Industrialists and Entrepreneurs of the Krasnoyarsk Krai.

On 22 May 2003, he was elected chairman of the board of directors of the Krasnoyarskaya HPP.

=== Member of the State Duma ===
On 7 December 2003, Ashlapov was elected to the State Duma of the IV convocation from the regional branch of the United Russia party. On 5 April 2006, he resigned as a deputy in connection with his appointment to the position of First Vice President - Executive Director of JSC Glavmosstroy Holding Company. The mandate was transferred to Boris Martynov.

=== Further business career ===
From April to June 2006, he was the executive director and vice-president of OAO Glavmosstroy.

From June to October 2006, he promoted to the General Director of OJSC Glavmosstroy.

From 2007 to 2008, he was the General Director of the Far Eastern Directorate of Rosstroy.

=== Deputy Minister of Regional Development ===
On 15 July 2008, Ashlapov was appointed Deputy Minister of Regional Development of Russia. He reigned as deputy minister in September 2009.

=== Return to business career ===
In June 2011, he had been the head of the Federal State Unitary Enterprise "Main Directorate for the Construction of Roads and Airfields of the Federal Agency for Special Construction".

From October 2012 to January 2013, he had been the head of the Federal State Unitary Enterprise Spetsstroyengineering under the Federal Agency for Special Construction.

In 2013, he was the chairman of the board of directors of Independent Generation Company.

== Accusations ==
In November 2013, Alexei Navalny stated on his blog that Ashlapov had two undeclared summer cottages in the Moscow Oblast.

Ashlapov replied that he was not going to deal with Navalny, since he was not a deputy or a civil servant: "I have not been an official for the fifth year already and I don't have to report to anyone, for anything. When I was an official, I declared all income and property."

According to Navalny, the cost of the Ashlapov estate in the village of Leshkovo, Istra District, Moscow Oblast, is approximately 178 million rubles.

== Awards ==
He has been awarded the Order of Friendship, the Certificate of Honor of the Government of the Russian Federation, the Badge of Honor "Honored Builder of the Russian Federation," and the Order of Seraphim of Sarov, 3rd Class.

== Family ==
He is married, and has five children. His hobbies are hunting, scuba diving, collecting hunting knives.
