= Chuvash State Institute of Humanities =

Educational institution in Cheboksary, Chuvashia, Russia

Chuvash State Institute of Humanities (Chuvash: Чӑваш патшалӑх гуманитари ӑслӑлӑхӗсен институчӗ, Russian: Чувашский государственный институт гуманитарных наук) — the oldest scientific institution of the Chuvash Republic. Located in Cheboksary. The organization was awarded the order "Badge of Honor" (1980).

The Institute conducts comprehensive research of theoretical and scientific-applied problems of the Chuvash language, literature and folklore, history, archaeology, Ethnology and arts of the Chuvash people and socio-economic development of the Chuvash Republic.

== History ==
On August 17, 1930, the Secretariat of the Chuvash regional Committee of the CPSU (b) decided to reorganize the Council of science and culture, founded in April 1928, into a research Institute.

August 18, 1930 the Council of people's Commissars of the Chuvash ASSR on the basis of the Council of science and culture formed the Chuvash complex research Institute. In August 1932, the Institute underwent reorganization: on the basis of the agricultural sector of the Chuvash complex research Institute, The research Institute of socialist reconstruction of agriculture was formed (it existed until 1934). On August 10, 1933, the Council of people's Commissars of the Chuvash ASSR reorganized the Chuvash comprehensive research Institute into two institutions: the Chuvash research Institute of industry (which existed until 1936) and the Chuvash research Institute of social and cultural construction. On August 25, 1938, the Institute was renamed the Chuvash scientific research Institute of language, literature and history by the resolution of the Council of people's Commissars of the Chuvash ASSR.

On January 1, 1948, according to the Resolution Of the government of the Chuvash ASSR of November 14, 1947, the Institute was transferred to the jurisdiction of the Council of Ministers of the Chuvash ASSR and became known as the Chuvash research Institute of language, literature and history under the Council of Ministers of the Chuvash ASSR. In January 1956 the Institute became known as the Chuvash research Institute of language, literature, history and Economics under the Council of Ministers of the Chuvash ASSR.

== See also ==
- Chuvash State University
