= Yuri Sevenard =

Russian politician (1935–2021)

Member of the State Duma
- In office 12 December 1993 – 19 December 1999

Personal details
- Born: 29 June 1935 Malaya Ulba, Glubokoye District, East Kazakhstan Oblast, Kazakh SSR, Soviet Union
- Died: 23 June 2021 (aged 85) Odintsovo, Moscow Oblast, Russia
- Resting place: Zavolzhye
- Party: Communist Party of the Russian Federation

Yuri Konstantinovich Sevenard (Russian: Ю́рий Константи́нович Севена́рд; 29 June 1935 – 23 June 2021) was a Russian politician. A member of the Communist Party of the Russian Federation, he served in the State Duma from 1993 to 1999.

He was born in what is now East Kazakhstan Region to a family of a hydraulic engineer. Yuri's mother was Celina Kschessinska, niece of ballet dancer Mathilde Kschessinska.

In 1958 he graduated from the Kuibyshev Moscow Engineering and Construction Institute. Sevenard participated in construction of the Aswan Dam in the 1960s. His younger son Konstantin Yuryevich was born there. In 1980 he was appointed director of the "Lengidroenergospetsstroy" association, which guided the Saint Petersburg Dam construction. Sevenard headed Lengidroenergospetsstroy for 21 years.

During the democratization process in the Soviet Union, Sevenard was elected to the Leningrad City Council. In June 1991, he ran for mayor of Leningrad. He won 25.72% of the vote and lost to Anatoly Sobchak. In 1996, when Sevenard ran for Governor of Saint Petersburg, he won 10% of the vote in the first round and placed fourth.

Sevenard died from COVID-19 in 2021. He was buried in Zavolzhye, Nizhny Novgorod Oblast, next to his parents.
