= Sherig-ool Oorzhak =

Head of the Republic of Tuva from 1992 to 2007 (1942–2026)

- Шериг-оол Ооржак
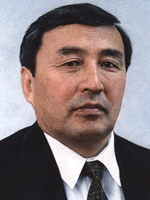

Head of the Republic of Tuva
- In office 11 April 2002 – 7 April 2007
- Preceded by: Position established
- Succeeded by: Sholban Kara-ool

President of the Republic of Tuva
- In office 27 March 1992 – 11 April 2002
- Vice President: Aleksey Melnikov
- Preceded by: Position established
- Succeeded by: Position abolished

Personal details
- Born: 24 July 1942 Shekpeer, Tuvan People's Republic
- Died: 8 April 2026 (aged 83)
- Party: United Russia (after 2005)
- Other political affiliations: Communist Party of the Soviet Union (before 1991)

Sherig-ool Dizizhikovich Oorzhak (Russian: Шериг-оол Дизижикович Ооржак; Tuvan: Шериг-оол Дизижик оглу Ооржак, romanized: Şerig-ool Dizijik oglu Oorjak; 24 July 1942 – 8 April 2026) was a Russian Tuvan politician. He was the leader of Tuva for 21 years, from 1986 to 2007.

== Early life and career ==
Oorzhak graduated from the Timiryazev Moscow Agricultural academy in 1971. From 1971 until 1980, he worked as an economist at and later the director of a government-owned farm (sovkhoz) in his hometown of Shekpeer.

In 1983, he became an activist in the Tuvan branch of the Communist Party. He graduated from Novosibirsk High Communist Party School in 1985. From December 1986, he was First Secretary in the Tuvan branch of the Communist Party of the Soviet Union, making him Tuva's de facto leader.

He was a three-time deputy of the Supreme Soviet of the Tuva Autonomous Soviet Socialist Republic. From 1990 to 1992, he was Chairman of the Council of Ministers (i.e. Prime Minister) of Tuva ASSR. In 1990, he was elected people's deputy of RSFSR. In August 1991, he was defeated by Kaadyr-ool Bicheldei in the race for Chairman of the Supreme Soviet of Tuva ASSR.

On 15 March 1992, he was elected to be President of the Republic of Tuva. In 1993 he was the head of the Constitutional Commission of Tuva (the Constitution was adopted on 21 October 1993). In 1997, he was re-elected as president.

According to the Tuvan constitution, Tuva was "an independent state in association with Russia" and could "declare war and sign international agreements of its own will". During the revision of Russian regional constitutions in 2000, these phrases were removed from the document. The political career of Oorzhak became uncertain after this, leading him to demonstrate his allegiance to the Kremlin by appointing Sergei Pugachev and Lyudmila Narusova to the Federation Council as representatives of Tuva.

In 2001, the newly adopted Tuvan constitution eliminated the position of President, replacing it with the title Head of Republic, enabling Oorzhak to avoid the two-term limit enforced on the president. On 17 March 2002, with 53% of the vote, he was elected as Head of the Republic and changed his title from President to Head of Republic.

He resigned from his position on 6 April 2007 and Sholban Kara-ool was appointed in his place.

== Death ==
Oorzhak died on 8 April 2026, at the age of 83.

== Honours and awards ==
- Order of Merit for the Fatherland, 3rd class (9 April 2007) - "for services to the state and many years of honest work"
- Order of Honour (2002)
- Order of Friendship (1997)
