= Sholban Kara-ool =

Former Head of the Republic of Tuva

Sholban Kara-ool MP
- Шолбан Кара-оол
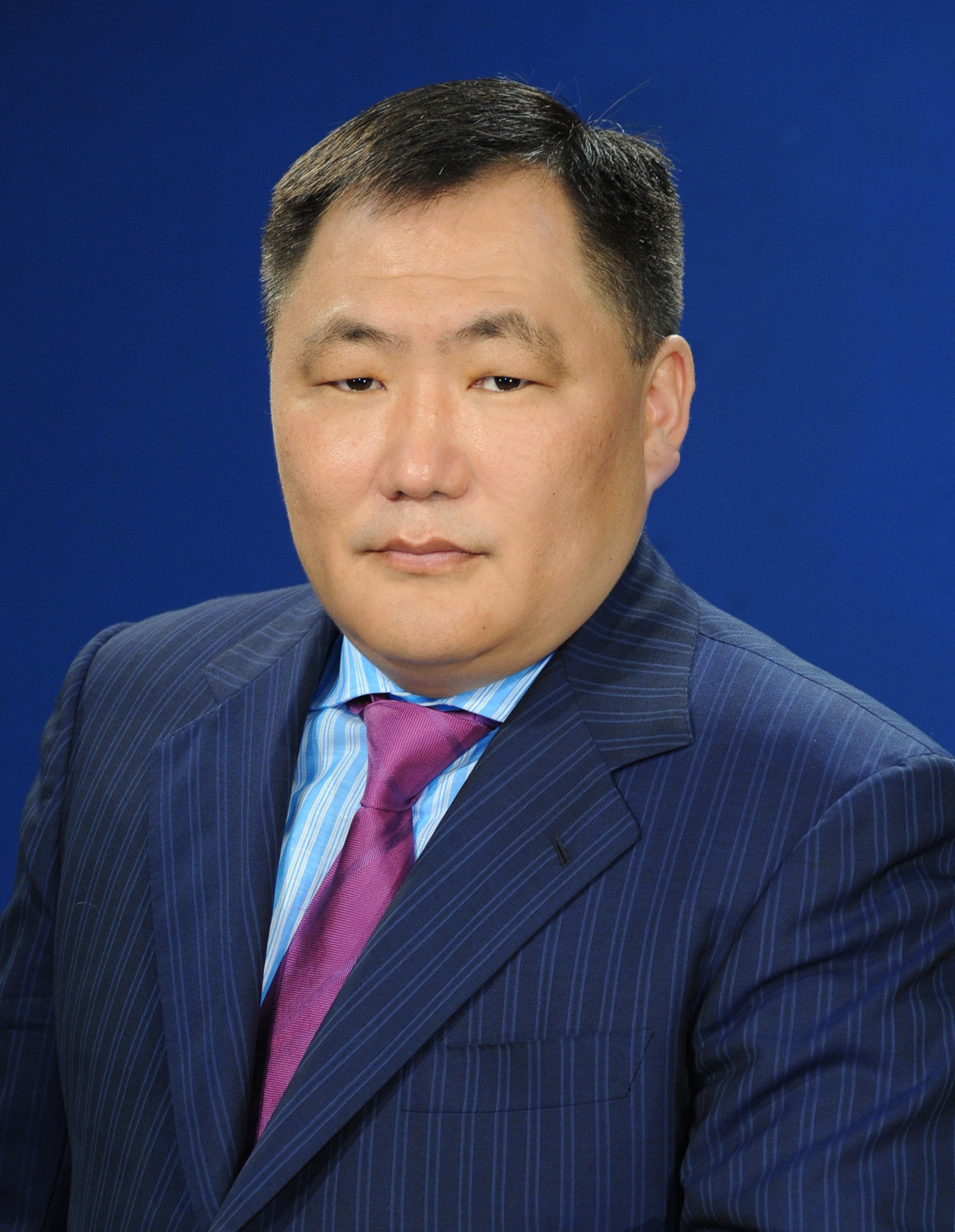
- Official portrait, 2009

Vice Chairman of the State Duma
- Incumbent
- Assumed office 12 October 2021
- Chairman: Vyacheslav Volodin

Member of the State Duma (Party List Seat)
- Incumbent
- Assumed office 12 October 2021

2nd Head of the Republic of Tuva
- In office 6 April 2007 – 7 April 2021
- Preceded by: Sherig-ool Oorzhak
- Succeeded by: Vladislav Khovalyg

Chairman of the Great Khural of Tuva
- In office 30 June 1998 – 13 June 2002
- Preceded by: Kaadyr-ool Bicheldey
- Succeeded by: Vasily Oyun (Legislative House); Dandyr-ool Oorzhak (House of Representatives)

Member of the Federation Council from the Republic of Tuva
- ex-officio as Chairman of the Great Khural
- In office 9 July 1998 – 24 December 2001
- Preceded by: Kaadyr-ool Bicheldey
- Succeeded by: Chamyr Udumbara

Personal details
- Born: 18 July 1966 (age 59) Choduraa, Ulug-Khemsky District, Tuvan ASSR, Russian SFSR, Soviet Union
- Party: United Russia
- Children: 3
- Education: Ural State University
- Occupation: Engineer
- Awards: Alt text

Sholban Valeryevich Kara-ool (Russian: Шолбан Валерьевич Кара-оол, Tuvan: Шолбан Валерий оглу Кара-оол, romanized: Şolban Valeriy oglu Kara-ôl; born 18 July 1966) is a Russian politician. He was the Head of the Republic of Tuva, a Russian republic, from 2007 to 2021.

== Biography ==
Kara-ool was born into an ethnic Tuvan family on 18 July 1966 in the village of Choduraa, Ulug-Khemsky District in the Tuvan Autonomous Soviet Socialist Republic, and has spent most of his life in Tuva. He spent several years as a sports instructor, eventually taking up engineering.

From 1998, he was a member of the Federation Council, serving as Deputy Chairman of the Committee on Foreign Affairs. In December 2001, he resigned as a member of the council, then was elected as a deputy of the Great Khural of the Tuva Republic of the third convocation.

On 17 March 2002, he ran for the post of the Head of the Republic — Chairman of the Government with 22% of the votes, but lost to the former President of Tuva Sherig-ool Oorzhak (53%). Afterwards he held the position of the First Deputy Chairman of the Government of the Tuva Republic, and then, from September 2003 to January 2005, the Minister of Trade, Consumer Services and Entrepreneurship Development of the Tuva Republic.

In April 2007, he became chairman of the government of the Republic of Tuva. One of Sholban Kara-ool's first steps in this position was to fully rehabilitate the founder of Tuvan People's Republic, Mongush Buyan-Badyrgy.

Since 2013, the governor's project "One village — one product" has been implemented in Tuva: the study of the resources of each municipality, then opening and development of the production of competitive agricultural goods. Another project called "Kyshtag for a Young Family" aimed to help young villagers to organize family livestock farms. Other initiatives of Kara-ool's administration include (re)involving of males in education and increasing of number of male teachers in Tuva; development of sports infrastructure, recreation sites, cultural and natural monuments.

On 23 May 2016, he resigned at his own request in order to set a snap election on September the same year. He was later elected head of the Tuva Republic and served in that position from 22 September 2016 to 7 April 2021.

On 7 April 2021, President Vladimir Putin accepted his resignation at his own request from the post of Head of the Tuva Republic. Kara-ool was succeeded by Vladislav Khovalyg, former mayor of Kyzyl.

=== Sanctions ===
Kara-ool was sanctioned by the UK government in 2022 in relation to the Russo-Ukrainian War.

== Personal life ==
Kara-ool is married, and has three children. In addition to his native Tuvan, he is fluent in Russian and German.

== Awards ==
- Order of Friendship (26 January 2017) — for the achieved labor success, social activity and many years of conscientious work
- Medal of the Order "For Merit to the Fatherland" 2nd class (23 March 2015)
- Order of Glory and Honor 2nd class (Russian Orthodox Church, 2011)
- Medal "For Contribution to Strengthening the Defence" (Ministry of Defence, 2019)

Political offices
Preceded by Sherig-ool Oorzhak (as Chairman of the Government)	Head of Tuva; 2007-2021	Succeeded by Vladislav Khovalyg (acting)
