= Dina Oyun =

Russian politician (born 1963)

- Дина Оюн
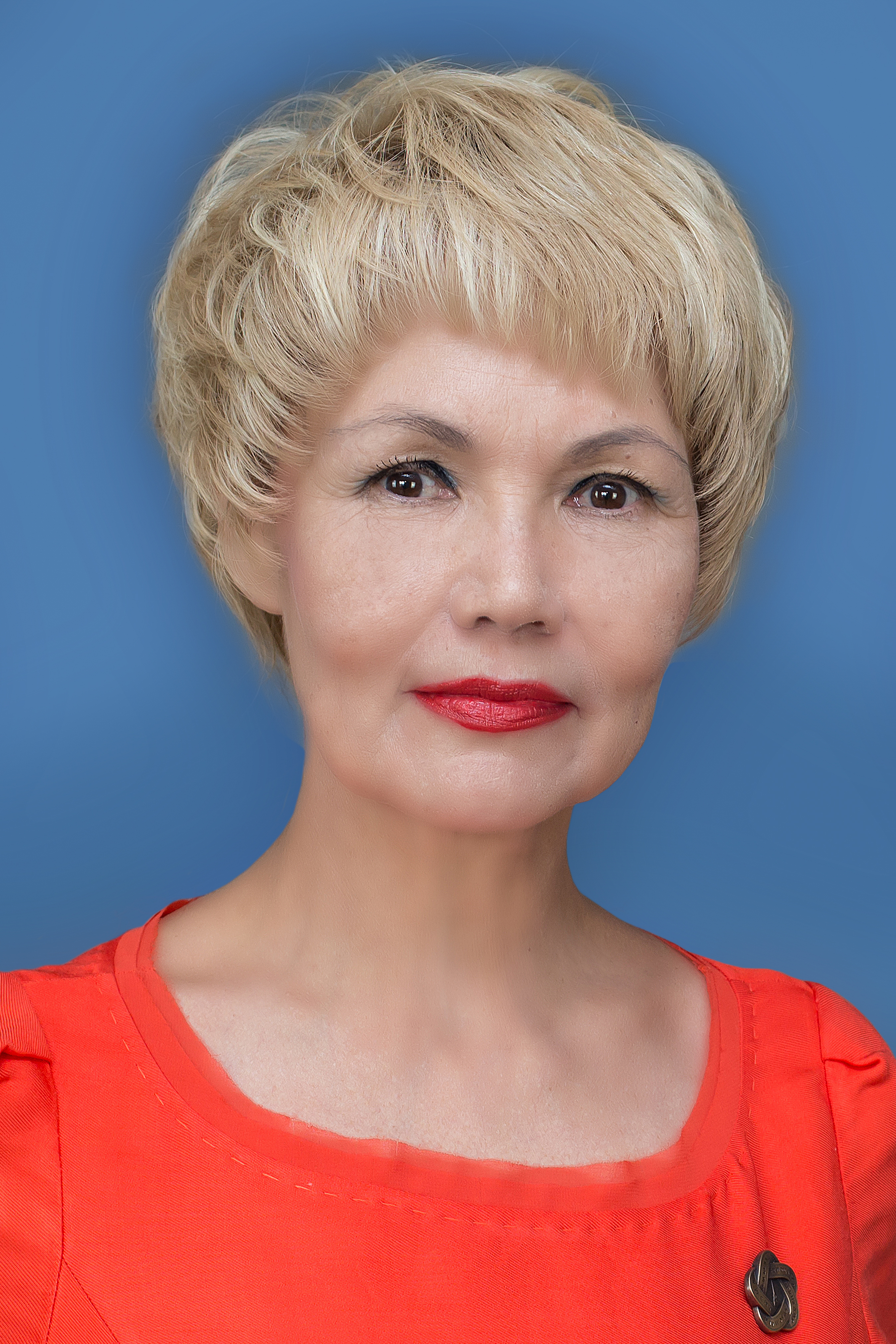

Senator from Tuva
- Incumbent
- Assumed office 14 October 2019
- Preceded by: Oksana Buriko

Personal details
- Born: Dina Oyun; 25 June 1963 (age 63) Kyzyl, Tuva, Russian Soviet Federative Socialist Republic, Soviet Union
- Party: United Russia
- Education: Moscow State Linguistic University

Dina Ivanovna Oyun (Russian: Дина Ивановна Оюн; born 25 June 1963) is a Russian politician serving as a senator from Tuva since 14 October 2019.

== Biography ==
Dina Oyun was born on 25 June 1963 in Kyzyl, Tuva. In 1985, she graduated from the Moscow State Linguistic University. In 2007, she also received a doctoral degree from the Diplomatic Academy of the Ministry of Foreign Affairs of the Russian Federation.

Right after graduation, Oyun worked as an English teacher, instructor for the Komsomol organizations in the Tuva region, as well as headed the student branches. From 1991 to 1993, she also headed the Tuva humanitarian center. Afterward, she was a correspondent of the local TV station. From 2007 to 2010, Oyun was the advisor to the Prime Minister of the Republic of Tuva. In 2013–2019, she was appointed the deputy of the Khural of representatives of the city of Kyzyl of the 4th and 5th convocations from the United Russia party. On 14 October 2019, she was elected senator from the Great Khural of Tuva.

Dina Oyun is under personal sanctions introduced by the European Union, the United Kingdom, the USA, Canada, Switzerland, Australia, Ukraine, New Zealand, for ratifying the decisions of the "Treaty of Friendship, Cooperation and Mutual Assistance between the Russian Federation and the Donetsk People's Republic and between the Russian Federation and the Luhansk People's Republic" and providing political and economic support for Russia's annexation of Ukrainian territories.
