= Constitution of Tuva =

Basic law of the Republic of Tuva

The Constitution of the Republic of Tuva (Russian: Конституция Тыва) is the basic law of the Republic of Tuva. It was adopted on 6 May 2001.

== Background ==
The current Constitution of Tuva is the 9th in its history. The first one was made in 1921, for the Tannu-Tuva People's Republic. The current one was adopted in a referendum on May 6, 2001.
