= Great Khural of Tuva =

Regional parliament of Tuva, Russia

Great Khural (Parliament) of the Republic of Tuva Тыва Республиканың Дээди Хуралы (парламентизи) (Tuvan) Верховный Хурал (парламент) Республики Тыва (Russian)
- 4th legislature

Type
- Type: Unicameral

Leadership
- Chairperson: Davaa Kan-ool, United Russia since 21 October 2010
- Deputy Chairperson: Irina Samoylenko, United Russia since September 2014

Structure
- Seats: 32
- Political groups: United Russia (25); LDPR (1) CPRF (2) New People (1); Independent (3)

Elections
- Last election: 8 September 2024
- Next election: 2029

Meeting place
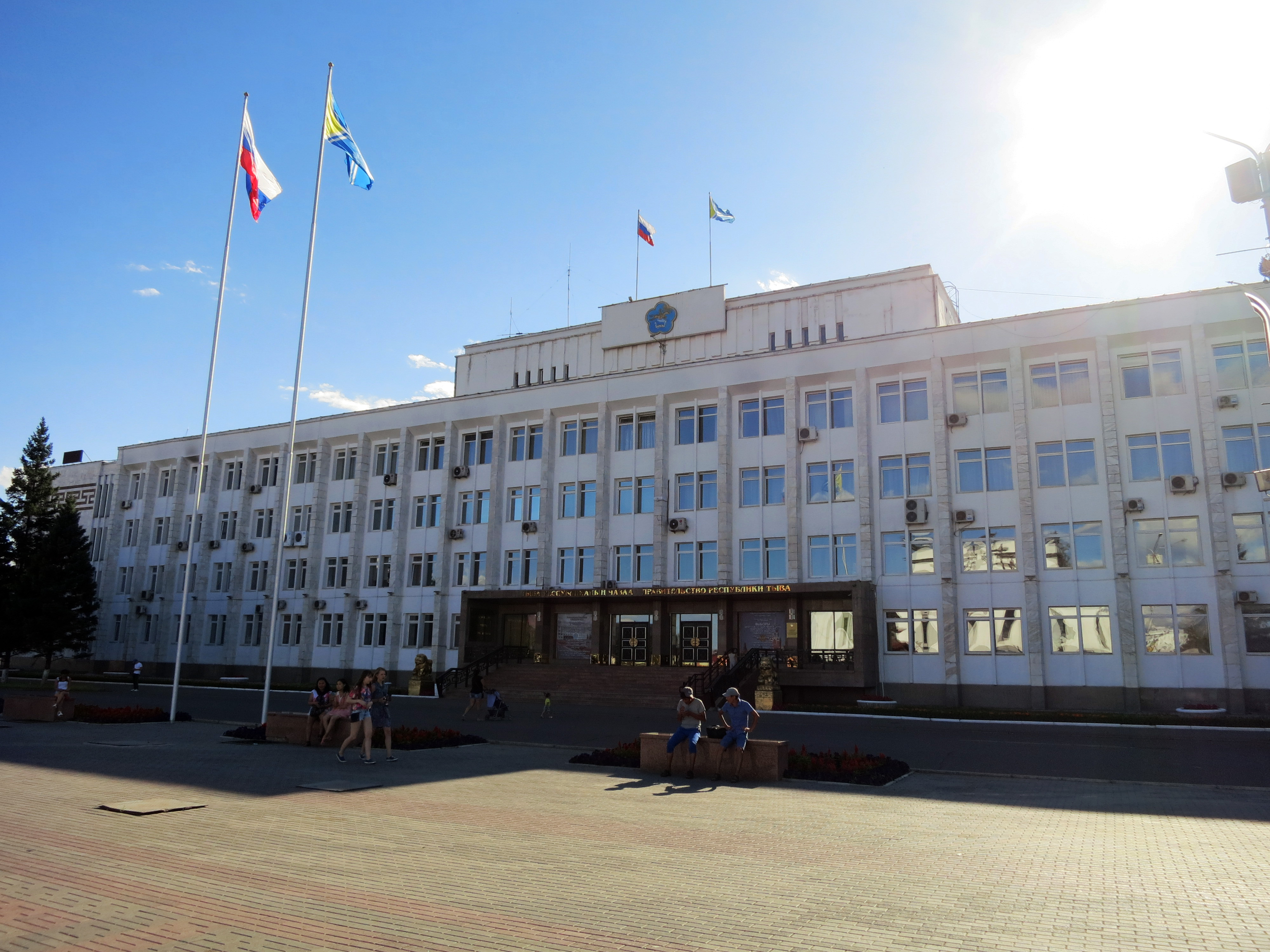
- 33 Lenin Street, Kyzyl

Website
- khural.rtyva.ru

The Great Khural of the Tuva Republic (Note: Tuvan: Тыва Республиканың Дээди Хуралы (парламентизи), romanized: Tıva Respublikanıñ Têti Xuralı (parlamentizi), pronounced [tʰɤˈʋa rʲɪsˌpublʲɪkəˈnɤŋ teːˈtɪ χʊɾaˈɫɤ pɐrˌɫamʲɪntɪˈzɪ]; Russian: Верховный Хурал (парламент) Республики Тыва; lit. 'Great Parliament of the Republic of Tuva') is the regional parliament of Tuva, a federal subject of Russia. A total of 32 deputies are elected for five-year terms.

== Elections ==
=== 2014 ===
Party	%	Seats
United Russia	84.03	31
A Just Russia	4.92	1
Liberal Democratic Party of Russia	1.49	0
Registered voters/turnout	80.53	

=== 2019 ===
Party	%	Seats
United Russia	80.13	30
Liberal Democratic Party of Russia	7.75	2
A Just Russia	4.56	0
Registered voters/turnout	75.03	

=== 2024 ===
Party	%	Seats
United Russia	80.01	25
Liberal Democratic Party of Russia	5.04	2
SR-ZP	3.29	0
CPRF	5.47	2
New People	5.41	1
Registered voters/turnout	58.86	

== See also ==
- List of chairpersons of the Great Khural of Tuva
- List of presidents of the Chamber of Representatives of the Great Khural of Tuva
- List of presidents of the Legislative Chamber of the Great Khural of Tuva
