= Chadan =

Chadan may refer to:

Places

- Chadan (town), a town in the Tuva Republic, Russia
- Chadan Urban Settlement, a municipal formation which Chadan Town Under District Jurisdiction in Dzun-Khemchiksky District of the Tuva Republic, Russia is incorporated as
- Chadan (river), a river in the Tuva Republic, Russia; a tributary of the Khemchik

People

- Gabriel Chadan, actress playing Adoniran in Amor à Vida, a Brazilian telenovela
- K. Chadan, with Pierre Sabatier, co-author of Inverse Problems of Quantum Scattering Theory
