= Jampel Lodoy =

Tuvan Buddhist lama (1975–2020)

- Джампел Лодой

4th and 7th Kamby Lama of Tuva
- In office 29 November 2019 – 23 June 2020
- Preceded by: Lobsan Chamzy
- Succeeded by: Gelek Natsyk-Dorju
- In office 2005–2010
- Preceded by: Lobsan Tubden
- Succeeded by: Suldum Bashky

Personal life
- Born: Apysh-ool Shuurakayovich Sat; 21 August 1975 Khondergey, Tuvan ASSR, Russian SFSR, Soviet Union
- Died: 23 June 2020 (aged 44) Kyzyl, Tuva, Russia

Religious life
- Religion: Tibetan Buddhism
- Temple: Gandan Puntsogling Monastery; Datsan Gunzechoinei; Drepung Gomang Monastery
- School: Gelug

Jampel Lodoy, (Note: Tuvan: Джампел Лодой, romanized: Dzhampel Lodoy; Russian: Джамбел Лодой, romanized: Dzhambel Lodoy) (Note: Also spelled as Dzhampel Lodoi or Jambal Lodoi.) born Apysh-Ool Shuurakayovich Sat (Note: Russian: Апыш-оол Шууракаевич Сат) (21 August 1975 – 23 June 2020) was a Tuvan Buddhist lama who served as the Kamby Lama of Tuva for two tenures. The Kamby Lama, or Supreme Lama, is the highest Buddhist religious authority in Tuva. Jampel Lodoy was first elected Kamby Lama from 2005 to 2010. During the 2010s, Jampel Lodoy became the abbot of Ustuu-Khuree, one of the largest Buddhist monasteries and temples in Tuva, which had been destroyed in 1937, but reopened in 2012.

On 29 November 2019 Jampel Lodoy was elected the 8th Kamby Lama of Tuva by a congress of Buddhist clergy. He was enthroned on 19 December 2019 in a ceremony held at the House of Folk Art, the headquarters of the Tuvan Ministry of Culture in Kyzyl. However, just seven months later, Jampel Lodoy died in office from complications of COVID-19 during the pandemic in Russia.

== Biography ==
Jampel Lodoy was born Apysh-ool Sat on 21 August 1975 in the village of Khondergey in Dzun-Khemchiksky District. His family were livestock herders and farmers.

He began studying Buddhism at the Gandan Puntsogling Monastery in Kyzyl in 1992, which coincided with the visit of the 14th Dalai Lama to Tuva and other regions of Russia. Jampel Lodoy then studied at Datsan Gunzechoinei, the main Buddhist temple in Saint Petersburg, from 1993 until 1996. He next enrolled at the Drepung Gomang Monastery in Uttara Kannada, India, in 1996, where he studied Buddhist philosophy for nine years and received a doctoral degree in philosophical sciences. Jampel Lodoy returned to Tuva following the completion of his program in India. In addition to his Buddhist studies, Jampel Lodoy became the first modern-day Tuvan monk to obtain a secular high education degree.

Jampel Lodoy was elected as the 5th Kamby Lama in 2005, succeeding Lobsan Tubden. He was enthroned on 30 April 2005. During his first five-year term as Kamby Lama from 2005 to 2010, Jampel Lodoy strengthened relationships with Buddhist leaders and the monastic sangha in Buryatia and Kalmykia. He also oversaw the construction and restoration of several large Buddhist temples and monasteries, in cooperation with Russian and Tuvan authorities. In 2009, Kamby Lama Jampel Lodoy and Shadzhin Lama Telo Tulku Rimpoche, the Supreme Lama of Kalmykia, jointly petitioned the Russian foreign ministry to allow the Dalai Lama to make another visit to the country.

Jampel Lodoy initially stood for a second term as Kamby Lama in 2010, along with Bolat-ool Mergen and Suldum Bashky. However, Jampel Lodoy, the sitting Supreme Lama, withdrew from the election in favor of Suldum Bashky, who was one of the oldest lamas in Tuva at the time. Jampel Lodoy explained his decision to endorse Bashky, saying, "Suldum Bashky, definitely, is an extremely wise person, with a deep spiritual practice, who has all the necessary knowledge. It would be difficult to think of a more suitable candidate. For that reason, right at the beginning I made the decision to withdraw my candidacy in favor of this respected man." In turn, Suldum Bashky was elected Kamby Lama on 12 March 2010, with the support of Tuva's Buddhist clergy.

During the 2010s, Jampel Lodoy became the abbot of Ustuu-Khuree in Chadan, one of the largest Buddhist monasteries and temples in Tuva. Ustuu-Khuree had originally opened in 1905, but was shuttered in 1930 and demolished in 1937 during the Great Purge in the Soviet Union and the Tuvan People's Republic. However, Ustuu-Khuree was reconstructed and reopened on 23 July 2012. He served as abbot of Ustuu-Khuree until late November 2019, when he was elected Kamby Lama.

On 29 November 2019 Jampel Lodoy, who was 43-years old at the time, was elected the 8th Kamby Lama by Buddhist clergy meeting at Tsechenling Temple in Kyzyl. He defeated the sitting 7th Kamby Lama, Lobsan Chamzy, who had been nominated for a second term. Kamby Lama Jampel Lodoy was enthroned in a ceremony held at the House of Folk Art, the headquarters of the Tuvan Ministry of Culture, on 19 December 2019. His second term as Kamby Lama would have expired in 2024.

In early June 2020, Kamby Lama Jampel Lodoy was diagnosed with COVID-19 during the COVID-19 pandemic in Russia. He had reportedly quarantined during the pandemic and taken precautions to limit his contact with others, but still contracted the coronavirus. Jampel Lodoy was admitted to Republican Infectious Diseases Hospital in Kyzyl on 10 June 2020, and placed on a ventilator in an induced coma for treatment. On 9 June 2020 the office of the Kamby Lama appealed to Russian Buddhists to prayer for his recovery and the recovery of all victims of the COVID-19 pandemic. They were joined by monks at the Drepung Gomang Monastery, where Jampel Lodoy had studied.

Kamby Lama Jampel Lodoy died from COVID-19 at Republican Infectious Diseases Hospital in Kyzyl, Tuva, on 23 June 2020, at the age of 44. Jampel Lodoy's death was announced in social media post by Sholban Kara-ool, the Head of the Republic of Tuva, who wrote, "I have received grave news. The Kamby Lama of the Republic of Tuva, honored Bashy Jampel Lodoy, has left us forever. This is a huge loss for our republic. He was supposed to turn only 45, he was so young." Kara-ool continued to pay tribute to the late Kamby Lama, calling him a "highly educated clergymen who knew how to convey the teachings of the Buddha to everyone and who offered help, support, and guidance to many people." He also reiterated the Buddhist belief that Kamby Lama would be reborn, saying, "We believe that if a person has led a virtuous life, then he will surely be reborn. I also believe this and think that thanks to his good deeds and the prayers of believers, the Kamby Lama of Tuva will return to us." Telo Tulku Rinpoche, the Honorary Representative of the Dalai Lama to Russia and Mongolia, as well as the former Shadzhin Lama (Supreme Lama) of Kalmykia, also expressed condolences, writing, "I was deeply saddened by the news of the passing of the Kamby Lama, who for many years selflessly served the Buddha's Teaching, cared for the spiritual development of people, and was a role model for many Buddhists. I pray for his good rebirth and will always keep a memory of him and rejoice that he lived a life full of deep meaning."

Tuva declared 26 June 2020 as a republic-wide day of mourning following Kamby Lama's death. Tuvan flags were lowered to half staff and public recreational activities not already cancelled by the COVID-19 pandemic were called off for the day. A small funeral, with limited attendance due to the pandemic, was held in Kyzyl. Kamby Lama Jampel Lodoy was buried in his native Dzun-Khemchiksky District on 26 June 2020.

In response to Kamby Lama Jampel Lodoy's death and the worsening COVID-19 pandemic in Tuva, the Tuvan government immediately suspended the Kyzyl city public transportation system on 23 June 2020. Tuva's Head of Government Sholban Kara-ool appealed to residents to take the pandemic seriously, noting that Jampel Lodoy was just 44 years old, "I once more want to remind our youth that this illness could be lethal for anyone. We see that this disease can be dangerous for anyone, even for young people." Tuva had more than 3,700 positive COVID-19 cases by late June 2020 and at least 39 deaths, including the Kamby Lama.

Following Jampel Lodoy's death, it was announced that Omak Bashky would temporarily assume the role of acting leader of Tuva's community Buddhist community until a new Kamby Lama is chosen. The 9th Kamby Lama, Gelek Natsyk-Dorju, was selected on 5 October 2020.
