= COVID-19 pandemic in Russia =

- Disease: COVID-19
- Pathogen: SARS-CoV-2
- Location: Russia
- First outbreak: Wuhan, Hubei, China
- Index case: Tyumen and Chita (global); Moscow (local)
- Arrival date: 31 January 2020
- Confirmed cases: 21,141,674
- Recovered: 20,307,569
- Deaths: 404,290; 387,887 (Ministry of Health) 820,307 (Rosstat)
- Fatality rate: 1.62%
- Vaccinations: 89,081,600 (total vaccinated); 79,702,400 (fully vaccinated); 187,374,510 (doses administered)

Government website
- стопкоронавирус.рф

The COVID-19 pandemic in Russia was a part of the pandemic of coronavirus disease 2019 (COVID-19) caused by severe acute respiratory syndrome coronavirus 2 (SARS-CoV-2).

The virus was confirmed to have spread to Russia on 31 January 2020, when two Chinese citizens in Tyumen (Siberia) and Chita (Russian Far East) tested positive for the virus. Early prevention measures included restricting the China–Russia border and extensive testing. The infection spread from Italy on 2 March, leading to additional measures such as cancelling events, closing schools, theatres, and museums, as well as shutting the border and declaring a non-working period which, after two extensions, lasted until 11 May 2020. By the end of March 2020, COVID-19 lockdowns were imposed by the majority of federal subjects of Russia, including Moscow. By the end of 2021, there were nearly 10.5 million cases and nearly 310,000 deaths in the country.

Russia had the tenth-highest number of confirmed cases in the world, after the United States, India, France, Brazil, Germany, South Korea, the United Kingdom, Italy and Japan. According to detailed data published by the Federal State Statistics Service (Rosstat), 114,268 people with COVID-19 died between April and November 2020. However, over 300,000 excess deaths were reported in the same time period, suggesting that the official pandemic death tally greatly underestimated the true number of COVID-19 related deaths.

Analysis of excess deaths from official government statistics, based on births and deaths and excluding migration, showed that Russia had its largest ever annual population drop in peacetime, with the population declining by 997,000 between October 2020 and September 2021, which demographer Alexei Raksha interpreted as being primarily due to the COVID-19 pandemic.

== Timeline ==
=== January–March 2020 ===
On 12 January, the World Health Organization (WHO) confirmed that a novel coronavirus was the cause of a respiratory illness in a cluster of people in Wuhan, Hubei, China, who had initially come to the attention of the WHO on 31 December 2019. Compared to SARS of 2003, the case fatality ratio for COVID-19 has been much lower, but the incubation period and transmission have been significantly greater, resulting in a significant total death toll. On 31 January, the first two cases in the country were confirmed, one in Tyumen, Tyumen Oblast, and another one in Chita, Zabaykalsky Krai. Both were Chinese nationals.

On 23 February, eight Russians from the cruise ship Diamond Princess were evacuated to Kazan, Tatarstan where they were hospitalised, including three confirmed cases. These cases were listed as occurring on international conveyance and not included in official Russian statistics by Federal Service for Surveillance on Consumer Rights Protection and Human Wellbeing. These eight people, including the three patients who recovered, were discharged from hospital on 8 March. Some of Russia's citizens abroad have been confirmed to be infected, on 28 February a Russian man tested positive in Azerbaijan after he had visited Iran. While some days later the health ministry of the UAE announced that two Russians got the virus in the United Arab Emirates.

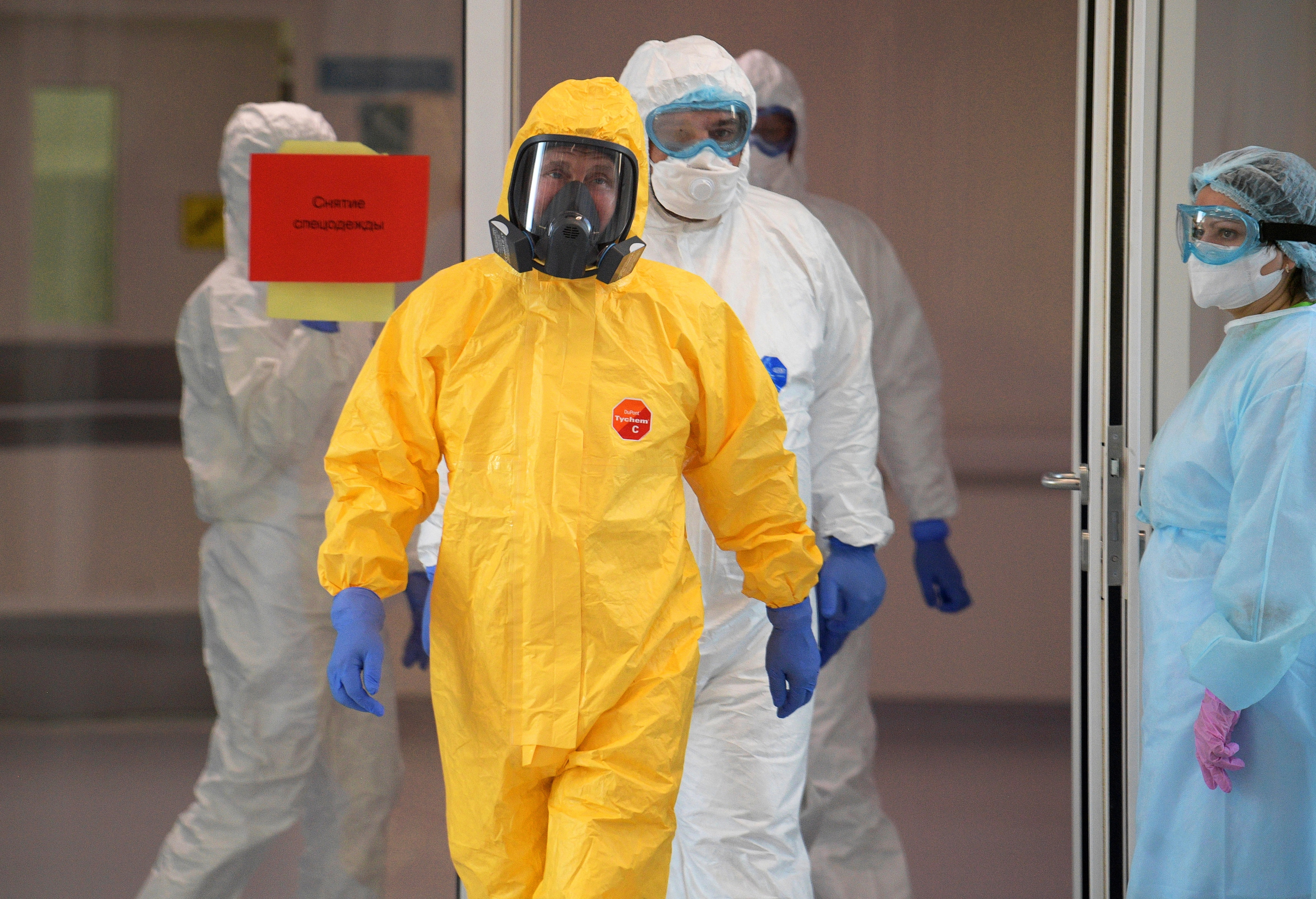
President Putin visits coronavirus patients at the City Clinical Hospital No. 40 in Moscow on 24 March 2020

There were no other confirmed cases until 2 March when the first case in Moscow was confirmed. The patient was a young man who fell ill on 21 February while on holiday in Italy, and returned to Russia on 23 February, staying at his house in Moscow Oblast. He showed up with symptoms at a clinic on 27 February, and was then hospitalised in Moscow. On 5 March, the first case in Saint Petersburg was confirmed. The patient was an Italian student who returned to Russia from Italy on 29 February, and was hospitalised on 2 March. On 6 March, six more cases were confirmed, with five of them being in Moscow and one of them being in Nizhny Novgorod. All of them were reported to be linked to Italy. On 19 March, the first death of a patient with confirmed COVID-19 was reported in Moscow. A 79-year-old woman was first hospitalised on 13 March and transferred to a private clinic the next day. Upon confirmation of COVID-19 she was transferred to intensive care. She also had numerous underlying health conditions and other diseases. However, her death was not counted as a coronavirus death. The first two confirmed deaths were recorded on 25 March in Moscow. The patients were 73 and 88 years old and had tested positive for the coronavirus. On 25 March, President Putin announced that the 2020 Russian constitutional referendum would be postponed due to the epidemic. He said that the next week starting on 30 March would be non-working nationwide and urged Russians to stay at home. Later, the non-working period was prolonged twice, lasting until 11 May. On 27 March, international flights were grounded after the government ordered the civil aviation authority to suspend all regular and charter flights to and from the country. On 29 March, Mayor of Moscow Sergey Sobyanin issued a stay-at-home order starting the next day. On 30 March, similar orders or recommendations were announced in numerous other federal jurisdictions, with many more announcing such restrictions over the next few days. The same day, the border was shut, with all border crossings closed.

=== April–June 2020 ===
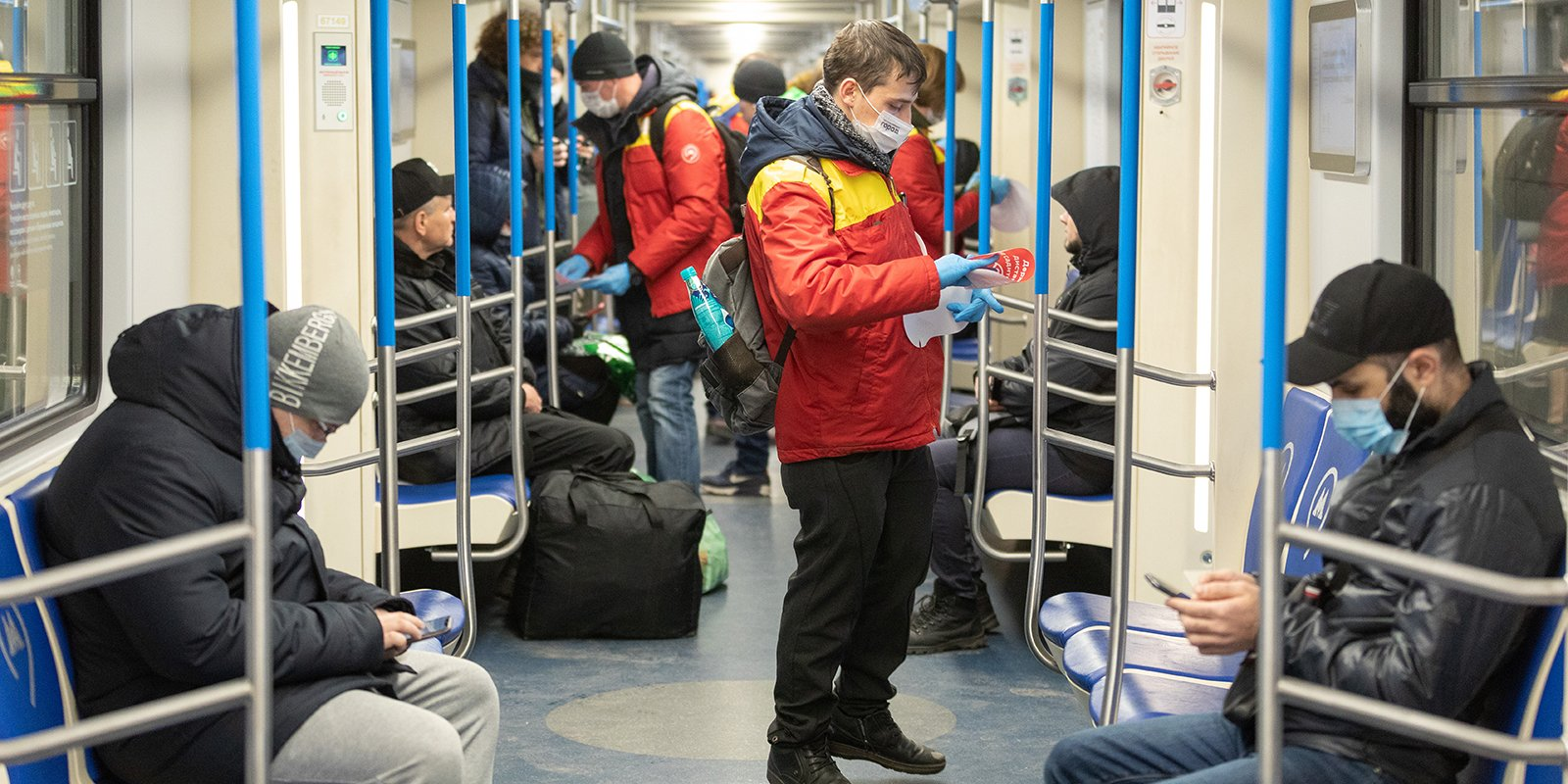
Moscow Metro passengers in April 2020

On 11 April, Moscow's mayor, Sobyanin, signed a decree introducing a digital pass system to enforce the coronavirus lockdown. Residents would require such a permit to travel around the city and Moscow Oblast using personal and public transport, with different types of passes including travelling to work, visiting hospitals and clinics, and private trips. Such permits would become mandatory on 15 April. On 29 April, Moscow Mayor Sergey Sobyanin said on social media that the city would start constructing temporary hospitals that would have a total of 10,000 hospital beds for coronavirus patients. Russia also indefinitely extended its entry ban for foreigners, which was originally set until 1 May, with Prime Minister Mishustin saying that the ban will be lifted when the coronavirus situation improved. On 30 April, Prime Minister Mishustin said that he tested positive for the virus.

On 9 May, with the 2020 Moscow Victory Day Parade postponed, celebrations marking the 75th anniversary of the surrender of Nazi Germany were reduced. An air show took place in Moscow instead and President Putin laid flowers at the Eternal Flame outside the Kremlin. Authorities also urged citizens to stay at home instead. On 10 May, the World Health Organization's representative to Russia, Melita Vujnovic, said that day that Russia may have reached the plateau for the virus. On 11 May, President Putin announced the end of the national non-working period on 12 May and also announced additional support measures. He also said that regional leaders can choose to keep restrictions. On 26 May, Putin announced that the postponed 2020 Victory Day Parade would be held on 24 June. On 27 May, Sobyanin announced that some restrictions in Moscow would be eased on 1 June, with all non-food stores and some service sector businesses re-opening and residents would be able to go outside for walks and sport according to a schedule.

On 1 June, the postponed referendum was announced to be held on 1 July. Reuters news agency also reported that Russia would roll out its first approved drug to treat COVID-19 in the next week. On 2 June, Prime Minister Mikhail Mishustin said that the government would launch a 5 trillion ruble ($73 billion) recovery plan in the next month to counteract the pandemic's economic impact. On 8 June, Moscow's mayor, Sobyanin, said that the city would lift coronavirus restrictions. Self-isolation rules and travel permits would be waived on 9 June, with no more walking schedules. Residents would be able to freely travel around the city and visit public places. Places like beauty salons, hairdressers and veterinarian clinics would re-open, with other places like restaurants re-opening over the course of June. Residents were still required to wear face masks and gloves and were advised to maintain their distance from others. That day, Prime Minister Mishustin also announced the partial re-opening of the border for some travellers, saying that it would allow citizens to leave the country for work, studying, medical treatment or to take care of relatives. It would also allow foreign citizens to enter for medical treatment or those needing to care for relatives and family. On 22 June, Moscow's mayor, Sobyanin, announced further easing of restrictions on 23 June with cafes and restaurants reopening as well as fitness centres and swimming pools. Restrictions on libraries and kindergartens would be lifted. On 23 June, President Putin announced changes to the tax system and further state benefits. On 24 June, the Victory Day parade in Red Square took place while it was reported that 30 major cities in Russia had cancelled their parade.

=== July–September 2020 ===
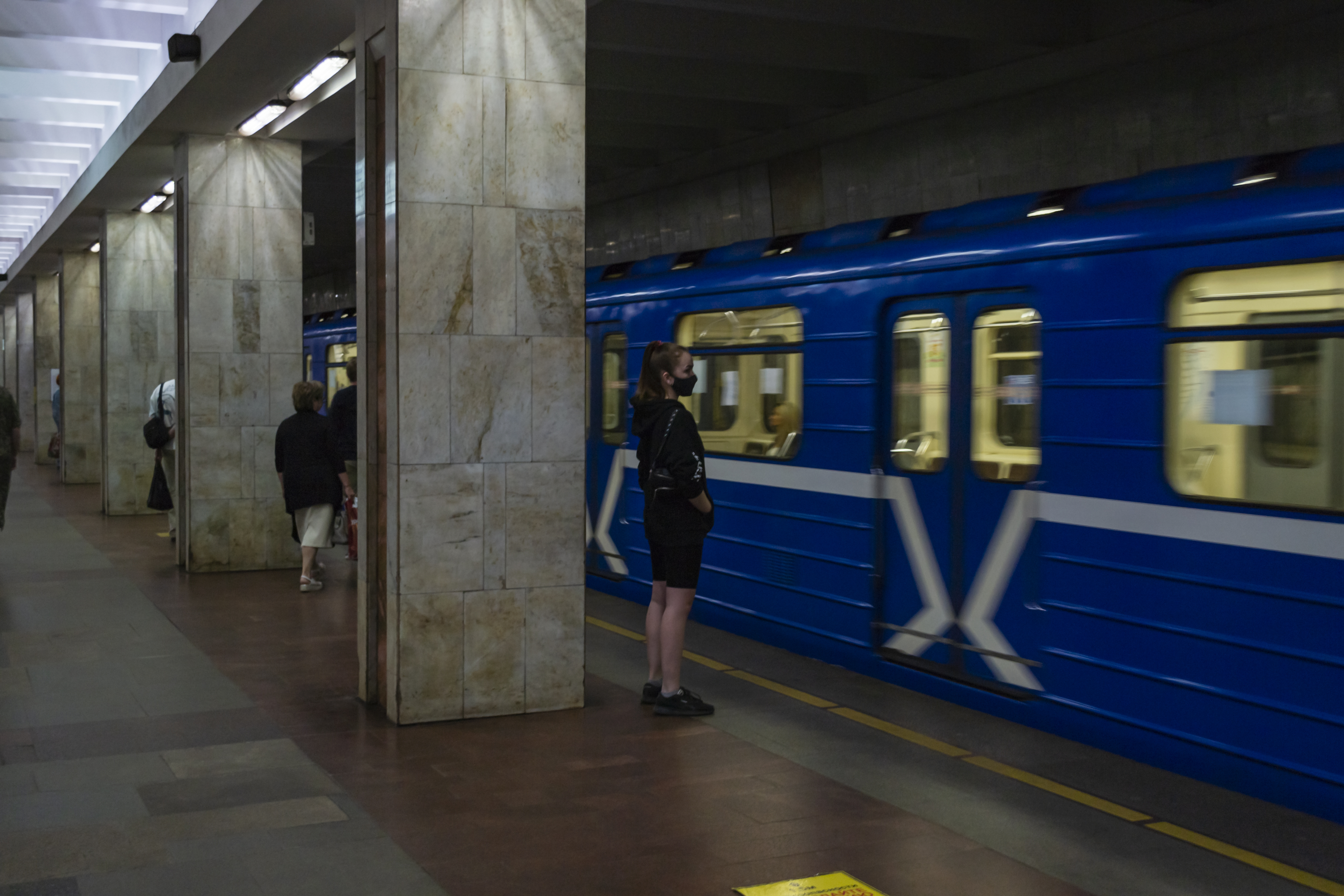
Using face masks in the Nizhny Novgorod Metro. Proletarskaya metro station

On 1 July, the main day for the vote on constitutional amendments took place. On 8 July, the governor of Moscow Oblast, Andrey Vorobyov, signed a decree easing some restrictions in the region including allowing restaurants, cafes, bars and other catering establishments to reopen from 25 July as well as a number of other places to reopen from 15 July. On 9 July, Moscow's authorities announced further easing of some restrictions with cinemas allowed to reopen and concerts allowed to be held from 1 August provided that they meet certain requirements. Attractions would be able to reopen and restrictions on places like parks and cultural centres would be removed on 13 July. Universities and schools would also be able to return to normal and the use of face masks and gloves outdoors would no longer be required except in public transport, shops and crowded areas. On 10 July, Tatyana Golikova said that starting on 15 July, authorities will start to gradually lift restrictions on flights abroad and will begin negotiations to restart international flights. On 15 July, the 14-day quarantine requirement for arrivals in the country was abolished with arrivals now requiring medical documents in English or Russian showing a negative test. Tatyana Golikova previously said that quarantines can be maintained for Russians returning from countries with high infection rates. On 16 July, Reuters reported that 30 million doses of the experimental vaccine would be produced domestically in Russia and the potential for 170 million to be manufactured abroad, according to the head of RDIF, Kirill Dmitriev. He also said that a Phase III trial involving several thousand people is expected to start in August. On 24 July, Tatyana Golikova said that the country plans to resume some international flights on 1 August.

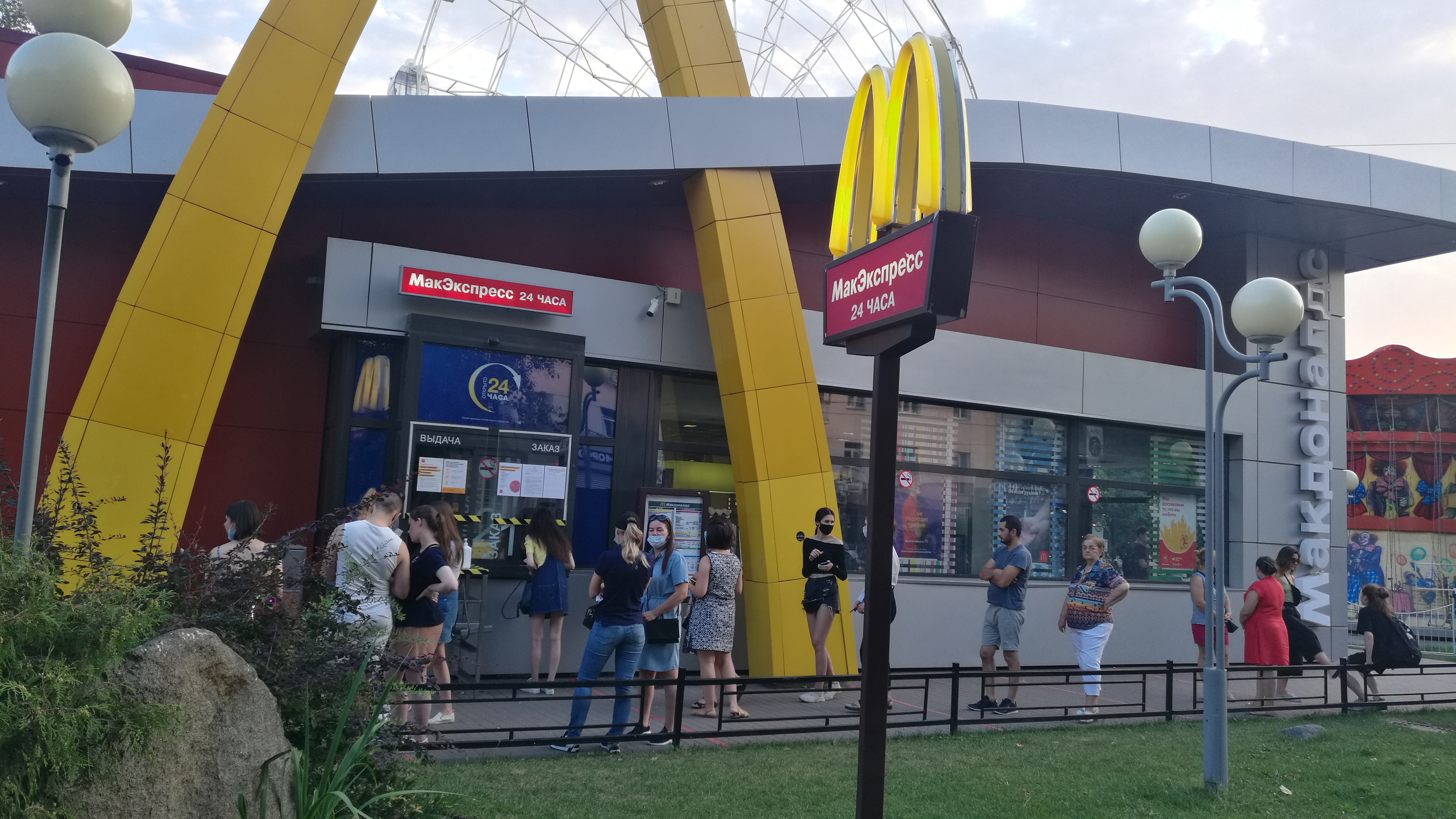
People wearing and not wearing face masks in Tyumen in August 2020

On 11 August, President Putin said in a meeting that the vaccine developed by the Gamaleya Research Institute of Epidemiology and Microbiology was the first vaccine against the coronavirus to be registered. He said that one of his daughters was vaccinated. The previous day, the Association of Clinical Research Organisations, a union of pharmaceutical companies in Russia, urged the head of the Ministry of Health to delay the registration due to incomplete testing. The head of the RDIF stated that 20 countries had requested in total 1 billion doses of the vaccine, nicknamed Sputnik V. On 31 August, the head of Rospotrebnadzor, Anna Popova, confirmed the beginning of the academic year at the next day on a full-time basis, saying the current epidemiological situation makes it possible to do so. The deputy prime minister Tatyana Golikova also previously said that higher education institutions would be able to postpone the start of the academic year by a maximum of two months, with 92% of universities starting normally.

On 1 September, Russia's confirmed number of cases surpassed 1 million, becoming the fourth country to reach that mark. Flights to Egypt, the Maldives and the United Arab Emirates were added to the list of countries where flights are planned to be resumed. On 5 September, Defense Minister Sergey Shoigu reported his condition on state TV after being vaccinated. On 8 September, the health ministry's press service said that the first batches of the vaccine developed by the Gamaleya Centre had entered civilian circulation. On 13 September regional elections in Russia were held, with social distancing measures and sanitary requirements for polling stations. Voting was also extended to three days, taking place from 11 to 13 September, with the main voting day on the last day, as well as other changes. On 17 September, RBC reported that pharmacies in Russia would begin selling Coronavir and Favipiravir for treatment of the virus. On 20 September, Prime Minister Mishustin signed a decree resuming flights with Belarus, Kazakhstan and Kyrgyzstan and South Korea. On 23 September, Rospotrebnadzor head, Anna Popova, signed a decree which requires Russian citizens who have returned from abroad by plane to stay home until they receive a negative test result. Also that day, it was reported that a State Duma deputy from the Communist Party, Vakha Agaev, had died from the virus, becoming the first death among State Duma members. On 28 September, Rospotrebnadzor head, Anna Popova, said that there was no need for new strict restrictions due to a rise in cases. She said that the situation had changed compared to the beginning of the year as well as the understanding of the virus, and attributed the rise in cases to the seasonality of the virus. On 29 September, the Chairman of the State Duma, Volodin, said that 18 deputies were in the hospital with the virus and that overall 60 deputies have been ill. The State Duma would also partially switch to working remotely.

=== October–December 2020 ===
On 2 October, it was published that in total, more than 45,000 people had died to date with coronavirus in Russia. The fatality rate in Russia was 4.6% at the end of August 2020. On 4 October there were confirmed 10,499 and it was the highest number since May 2020. 13,634 were confirmed on 11 October. 15,150 were confirmed on 15 October and it was the highest number since the pandemic started. Also daily deaths have steadily been increasing. There are now 23,723 deaths in the country.

On 6 November, Russian statistics published that 55,671 people had died with coronavirus before 30 September 2020. The official death toll was 20,891. On 8 November 2020, Russia reported 20,498 new coronavirus infections and 286 coronavirus-related deaths. This brings the number of infected cases to a total of 1,774,334 and the death toll to 30,537.

On 28 December, the Federal State Statistics Service said that the amount of recorded deaths from all causes between January and November had risen by 229,700 compared to 2019. Tatyana Golikova, Deputy Chairman of the Government, said that more than 81% of these deaths could be attributed to COVID-19, meaning at least an estimated 186,000 Russians had died because of the virus.

=== 2021 ===
According to a Levada poll conducted in November 2021, percentage of those who are concerned about getting infected with COVID-19 is 48%, while those not concerned 50%, while 39% personally knew someone who survived COVID-19 infection in acute form and 27% knew someone who died as result. 61% believes that COVID-19 is a biological weapon, and that belief is much more widespread among 55+ respondents (68%) than among younger ones (43%).

Despite the availability of a vaccine many Russians refused to get vaccinated leading to new waves of infections. During the summer and fall of 2021 Russia experienced severe waves of the Delta variant. Mortality rates reached record levels. Authorities introduced QR codes for vaccinated individuals restricting access to malls, restaurants and other public places for the unvaccinated

=== 2022 ===
At the beginning of 2022 Russia faced the Omicron variant, but this time the government did not impose strict restrictions. The government's focus shifted to the invasion of Ukraine, which began on 24 February. This led to reduced media attention to the pandemic. By the end of 2022 most COVID measures had been lifted with officials claiming that the situation was under control.

== Government responses ==
The government of Russia initially responded to the pandemic with preventive measures to curb the spread of COVID-19, which involved imposing quarantines, carrying raids on potential virus carriers, and using facial recognition to impose quarantine measures. Measures to prevent a crisis in Russia include banning the export of medical masks, random checks on the Moscow Metro, and cancellation of large-scale events by schools. The Russian government has also taken measures to prevent foreign citizens from heavily affected countries from visiting Russia. Local governments have also responded to the pandemic by imposing their own preventive measures in their communities.

=== Lockdowns ===
Map of federal subjects that have announced the "self-isolation regime". Stay-at-home order Partial restrictions or recommendations

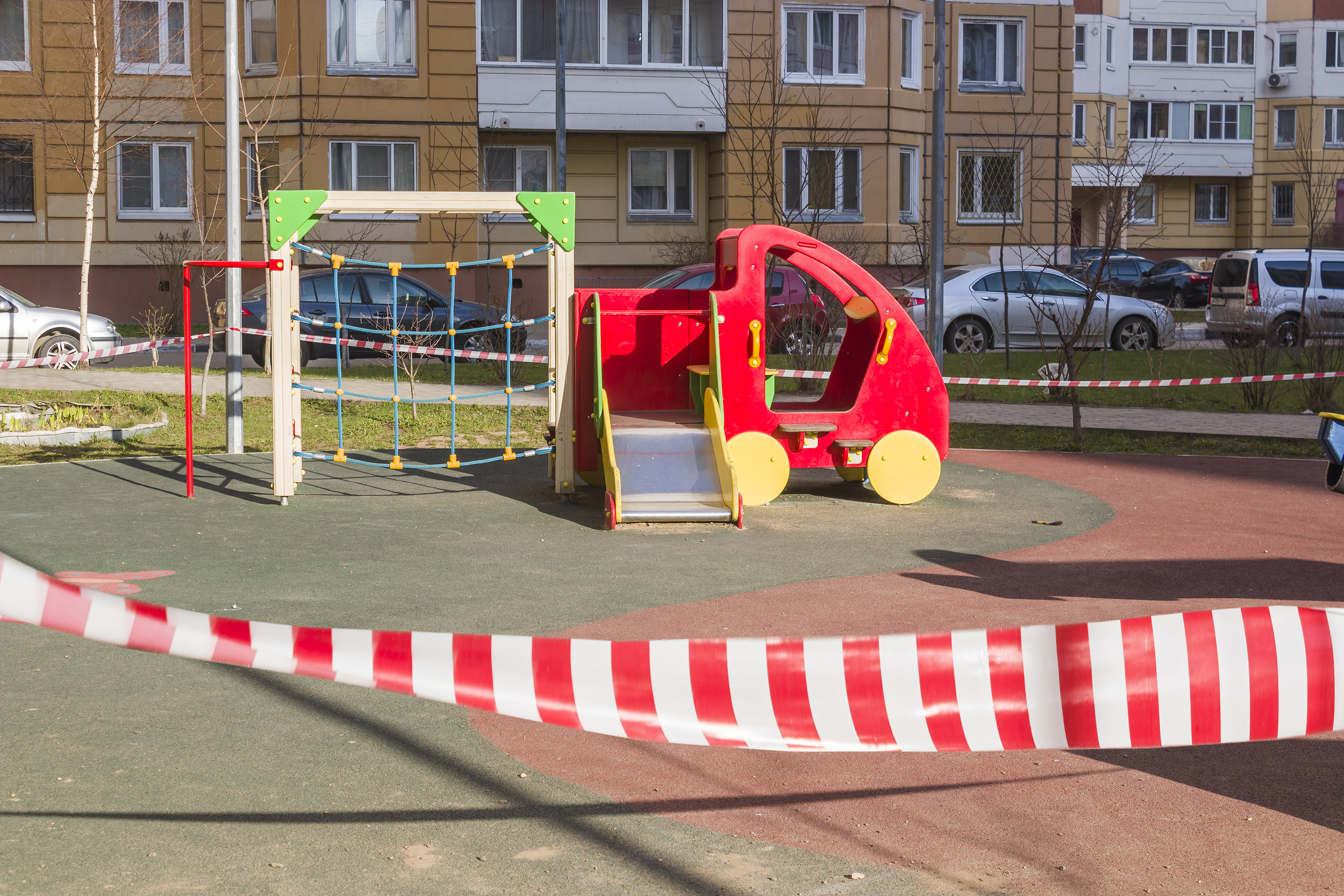
Playground closed for quarantine, 7 April 2020

On 28 March, Chechen authorities urged the population of the republic to stay at their places of permanent residence, and banned entry to Grozny for anyone except emergency services, food supplies, government officials, police, and journalists. On the next day, Chechnya closed its borders, with a full lockdown coming into effect on 30 March.

On 29 March, Moscow issued a stay-at-home order for all residents starting on 30 March. Muscovites were not allowed to leave their homes except in cases of emergency medical care and other threats to life and health, to travel to work for those who are obliged to, to make purchases in the nearest shop or pharmacy, to walk pets at a distance not exceeding 100 metres from the place of residence, as well as to take out the garbage. People were instructed to keep a distance of 1.5 metres from other people. Those recently unemployed will receive 19,500 rubles a month. After that, a similar regime was introduced in Moscow Oblast at 20:00 MSK on 29 March.

On 30 March, similar orders were announced in Adygea, the Komi Republic, Mari El, Tatarstan, Chuvashia, some districts of Sakha Republic, Arkhangelsk, Astrakhan, Belgorod, Irkutsk, Kaliningrad, Kursk, Lipetsk, Murmansk, Nizhny Novgorod, Novgorod, Ryazan, Saratov, Sverdlovsk, Ulyanovsk and Vologda oblasts, the cities of Bryansk and Saint Petersburg. Leningrad Oblast banned movement of people between districts and introduced a lockdown in the town of Murino.

On 31 March, the "self-isolation regime" was announced in republics of Altai, Bashkortostan, Buryatia, Dagestan, Ingushetia, Kabardino-Balkaria, Kalmykia, Karachay-Cherkessia, Karelia, Khakassia, Mordovia, Udmurtia and Tuva, Altai, Khabarovsk (for those over 65), Krasnodar, Krasnoyarsk, Perm, Primorsky, Stavropol and Zabaykalsky krais, Bryansk, Chelyabinsk, Kaluga, Kemerovo, Kirov, Kostroma, Kurgan, Magadan, Novosibirsk, Omsk, Penza, Pskov (for those over 65), Rostov, Sakhalin, Samara, Smolensk, Tambov, Tomsk, Vladimir, Volgograd, Voronezh and Yaroslavl oblasts, Khanty-Mansi and Yamalo-Nenets autonomous okrugs, the Jewish Autonomous Oblast, the city of Sevastopol. Republics of Yakutia and Karelia limited the sale of alcohol.

On 1 April, the "self-isolation regime" was announced in the disputed territory of Crimea and Sevastopol, the republic of North Ossetia–Alania, Kamchatka and Khabarovsk krais, Ivanovo and Orenburg oblasts. On 2 April, the measures were announced in Amur Oblast (for those over 65), Tyumen Oblast, and Chukotka Autonomous Okrug. On 3 April, the measures were announced in Oryol Oblast and Tula Oblast (for those over 65).

=== Vaccination ===
Mass vaccinations began in December 2020, starting with primarily doctors, medical workers and teachers. Vaccinations began in Moscow on 5 December and were expanded to all other regions by 15 December. In January 2021, the vaccination programme was extended to the entire population.

As of 20 July 2021, 33.19 million people have received at least one dose, with 21.6 million people fully vaccinated.

== Notable deaths ==
=== Businesspeople ===
- 30 November – Boris Aleksandrov, 73, founder and President of Rostagroexport Group, creator of the brand name B. Y. Aleksandrov
- 24 December – Vladimir Khristov, 71, founder and owner of Public Joint Stock Company Susumanzoloto (Magadan), gold manufacturer with fortune of 0.5 bln. $

=== Clerics ===
For the clerics of the Russian Orthodox Church, only those serving in Russia are included

- 4 May – Jonah (Karpukhin), 79, metropolitan of the Astrakhan and Kamyzyak eparchy
- 7 May – Ambrose (Yurasov), 82, archimandrite, founder and ghostly father of the Presentation Nunnery in Ivanovo, died of pneumonia (suspected infection)
- 1 June – Isidore (Kirichenko), 79, Metropolitan of Ekaterinodar and Kuban'
- 9 June – Seraphim Glushakov, 51, Bishop-emeritus of Anadyr' and Chukotka
- 23 June – Jampel Lodoy (Apysh-ool Sat), 44, Kamby Lama (Supreme Lama) of Tuva, tested positive for COVID-19
- 22 July – Eulogius Smirnov, 83, Mitropolitan-emeritus of Vladimir and Suzdal'
- 8 August – Isidore (Kirichenko), 79, Metropolitan of Ekaterinodar and Kuban'
- 20 November – Theophanes (Ashurkov), 73, Metropolitan of Kazan' and Tatarstan

=== Entertainers ===
- 19 April – Alexander Vustin, 76, composer, COVID-19 (not proven)
- 26 May – Samvel Gasparov, 81, filmmaker, director
- 20 September – Mikhail Borisov, 71, showman, actor, PhD in psychology, professor in Boris Shchukin Theatre Institute
- 29 October – Alexander Vedernikov, 56, conductor, music director and principal conductor of the Mikhailovsky Theatre (2019–2020), chief conductor of the Royal Danish Opera (2018–2020), chief conductor of the Odense Symphony Orchestra (2009–2018), music director of the Bolshoi Theatre (2001–2009)
- 2 December – Boris Plotnikov, 71, actor
- 18 December – Roman Arbitman (Lev Gursky), 58, fiction writer
- 2 January 2021 – Vladimir Korenev, 80, film and theatre actor, teacher, People's Artist of Russia
- 14 January 2021 – Boris Grachevsky, 71, film director, screenwriter, artistic director of Yeralash, a Russian children's comedy TV show and magazine
- 29 January 2021 – Vasily Lanovoy, 87, film and theatre actor, teacher, People's Artist of Russia

=== Medics ===
On 25 April 2020, it was reported that doctors had published and were updating a public list of colleagues who had died during the pandemic which, as of 19 November, has 838 names.

=== Politicians ===
- 16 May – Viktor Shudegov, 67, former member of the Federation Council and the State Duma, leader of A Just Russia party's regional office in Udmurtia
- 26 May – Vladimir Lopukhin, 68, former Minister of Fuel and Energy of Russia (1991–1992)
- 18 June – Mikhail Ignatyev, 58, former Head of the Chuvash Republic (2010–2020)
- 23 September – Vakha Agaev, 67, Member of the State Duma (2011–2020) from the Communist Party, left-wing politician, businessman, D.Sc. in Economics
- 29 October – Ulfat Mustafin, 61, Ufa mayor (2018–2020), city manager, PhD in engineering (concerning gas pipelines)
- 18 December – Valentin Shurchanov, 73, Member of the State Duma (1999–2020) from the Communist Party, left-wing politician, Secretary of Communist Party Central Committee (2009–2013)

=== Scientists ===
- 7 April – Mishik Kazaryan, 72, physicist, professor, tested positive for COVID-19
- 12 May – Ernest Vinberg, 82, mathematician at Moscow State University
- 30 November – Irina Antonova, 98, art historian, expert in Italian Renaissance art, Director of the Moscow's Pushkin State Museum of Fine Arts (1961–2013)
- 26 December – William Schmidt, 51, D.Litt. (Philosophy), professor of RANEPA, specialist in religious studies including philosophy and history of religion
- 15 January 2021 – Anatoly Vishnevsky, 85, D.Sc. (Economy), economist, demographer, writer, Director of the Higher School of Economics Institute of Demography since 2007

=== People in sports ===
- 13 May – Magomed Aliomarov, 67, head coach of the Russian women's national wrestling team, former wrestler
- 3 July – Abdulmanap Nurmagomedov, 57, wrestling (freestyle & sambo) coach, father and personal coach of Khabib Nurmagomedov, a professional mixed martial artist

== Statistics ==
The official national statistics include data by region. As of May 2020, some local governments were separately reporting their own data that differed from the national government's count.

==== Cumulative number of cases, active cases, recoveries and deaths ====
View source data.

=== Daily cases ===
View source data.
View source data.

==== Confirmed deaths per day ====
View source data.

=== Mortality data ===
Confirmed or probable COVID-19 deaths per million by federal subjects in April–November 2020, according to Rosstat.: 2,000–5,000 1,000–2,000 500–1,000 / 200–500 100–200 / 50–100 20–50

==== National ====
On 13 June, the Russian Federal State Statistics Service (Rosstat) published data on natural population changes in April. 2,712 people with COVID-19 died during April across Russia, including 1,660 as the primary cause of death. According to daily updates of the Emergency Operations Center, there were only 1,162 deaths from COVID-19. Rosstat's published death toll includes both those where the virus was determined to the main cause of death, as well as where the main cause of death was determined to be something else. 1,270 deaths are where the virus was determined to be the main cause, 435 deaths where the virus had a "significant influence", 617 deaths where the virus was present but did not play a major role, and 390 deaths where the person tested negative but it was later determined to be the main cause of death. Officials including Tatiana Golikova said that the changes in the counting method follows WHO recommendations. She also said that the figures represent a 2.6% death rate among those infected, and that the death rate for May will be higher.

Pavel Malkov, the head of Rosstat, said in an interview with RBK published on 23 June that the statistics agency had published a higher death toll for April because it receives more complete data than the national coronavirus crisis centre and that it has a different calculation methodology, saying that the agency receives data from the Civil Registry Office and deals with death certificates that can take up to 45 days to complete following testing while the crisis centre publishes operational data manually entered into the system. He also said that "one of the biggest secrets in statistics is that it's practically impossible to manipulate" and that "if we're talking about a qualitative indicator with a developed methodology, then any attempt to affect the final numbers by distorting the input data will become immediately evident".

On 10 July, Rosstat published data which said that COVID-19 was confirmed or assumed to be the main cause of death for 7,444 people who died in May. An additional 5,008 people with a COVID-19 diagnosis were determined to have died from other diseases, with the virus being a catalyst for 1,530 of those deaths. The death toll reported by the coronavirus crisis centre for May was 3,633. The data also said that 172,914 people had died in Russia in May, an increase of more than 18,000 compared to the same month last year.

On 7 August, Rosstat published mortality data for June which included 11,917 deaths for people with COVID-19, with the virus being determined or believed to have been the primary cause of death for 7,037 of them, with 1,589 without PCR verification. The total number of people with COVID-19 who died from April to June was therefore 27,411 according to Rosstat's data, with a death rate of 4.2% of confirmed cases.

On 4 September, Rosstat published mortality data for July which included 10,079 deaths for people with COVID-19, with the virus determined or suspected to have been the primary cause of death for 5,922 of them. The death toll reported by the national coronavirus crisis centre for July was 4,522. Rosstat's data also showed that 181,479 deaths were registered in July, the highest monthly number of deaths since August 2010, compared to an average of around 150,000 over the past five years.

On 2 October, Rosstat published mortality data for August which included 7,463 deaths for people with COVID-19, with the virus identified and determined to have been the main cause of death for 3,222 of them. The number of people with COVID-19 who died from April to August 2020 was 45,663 according to Rosstat's data.

On 6 November, Rosstat published mortality data for September which included 9,798 deaths for people with COVID-19, with the virus identified and determined to have been the main cause of death for 4,329 of them. The number of people with COVID-19 who died from April to September 2020 was 55,671 according to Rosstat's data.

On 10 December, Rosstat published mortality data for October which included 22,571 deaths for people with COVID-19, with the virus identified and determined to have been the main case of death for 11,630 of them. The number of people with COVID-19 who died from April to October 2020 was therefore 78,623 according to Rosstat's data. 47,000 more deaths in October were also recorded compared to the previous year.

On 28 December, Rosstat published mortality data for November which included 35,645 deaths for people with COVID-19, with the virus identified or determined to have been the main cause of death for 19,626 of them. 78,541 more deaths in November were also recorded compared to the previous year, an increase of 55.6%, while the national task force reported only 11,905 coronavirus deaths over the month. Deputy Prime Minister Tatyana Golikova said that more than 80% of excess deaths were related to the coronavirus. In total, 230,000 more deaths were reported in 2020 compared to the previous year (including January–March).

Rosstat data showed 116,030 deaths can be attributed directly to the coronavirus by 28 December 2020, and over 200,000 by March 2021. On 2 April, the coronavirus related deaths enumerated 225,572 fatalities, and over 316,000 by August 2021.

==== Regional ====
On 28 May, Moscow's health department said that the death toll for the city for April was 1,561 using a new methodology, where originally it was 636. It said that this included 756 people diagnosed with the virus but determined to have died of other causes and 169 people who tested negative but were suspected to have had the virus. The official death toll for the city or country had not been revised.

On 3 June, the city of St. Petersburg reported a 32% higher death rate in May compared to the previous year. The city government said that 6,427 death certificates were issued, compared to 4,875 the previous year. For the same month, the official coronavirus death toll was 171 people.

On 10 June, Moscow's health department increased the city's coronavirus death toll from 1,895 to 5,260 for May. It said that "COVID-19 as a main or an accompanying cause of death was registered in 5,260 cases". It also said that the difference was due to changes made by the Health Ministry in the approach of counting deaths, saying that "new recommendations allowed us to improve the calculation of cases where COVID was the main cause of the death and of those where it became, with a high degree of probability, a catalyst...for other illnesses".

=== Controversies ===
In March 2020, there was some scepticism about the accuracy of Russia's reported infection figures. Anastasia Vasilyeva, leader of the Doctors' Alliance organisation loosely aligned to the Russian opposition and doctor for opposition figure Alexei Navalny, made a series of videos accusing the authorities of concealing the true number of coronavirus cases by using pneumonia and acute respiratory infection as a diagnosis instead. Health officials rejected the allegation. The WHO's representative to Russia, Dr. Vujnovic, expressed scepticism at the allegation. President Putin later addressed concerns about statistics, saying that the government is not covering up the number of cases, though might not have the full picture. Analysis of the statistical properties of the official Russian daily infection counts found that the preferred noise model of the Russian data through to May 2021 was sub-Poissonian, with a factor of about 10 to 100 less noise than for other countries with similarly high infection counts, and the fourth lowest 28-day noise level out of 78 countries.

In May 2020, as Russia's mortality rate was much lower compared to other hard-hit countries, a number of media outlets including the Financial Times and New York Times said that the number of deaths in the country may have been under-reported, based on a spike in mortality rates officially reported in Moscow where approximately 1,800 more deaths were registered in April compared to the monthly average, while the Financial Times noted a similar surge in St. Petersburg, concluding that there could be around 70% more deaths than reported. The reported excess deaths were considerably smaller compared to other hard-hit areas in other countries. Foreign Ministry spokeswoman Maria Zakharova called the reports "disinformation" and said that letters demanding a retraction would be sent. Moscow's health department rejected the media reports, saying that autopsies were being conducted in all suspected coronavirus deaths, which was why "post-mortem diagnoses in Moscow and causes of death, in the end, are exceedingly accurate, and the mortality data absolutely transparent". It said that over 60% of deaths in the city with suspected coronavirus infections were ascribed to other causes. The World Health Organization's guidelines on reporting deaths, issued in mid-April, states that "deaths due to COVID-19" should be considered as such "unless there is a clear alternative cause of death that cannot be related to COVID disease." The Federal State Statistics Service's counting process runs contrary to the WHO's guidelines.

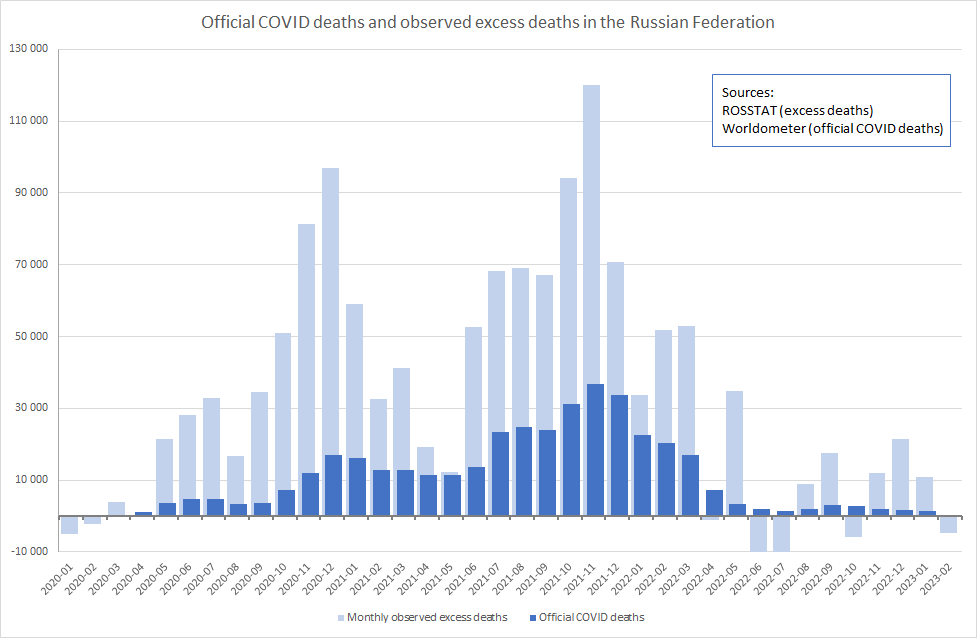

Russian media have reported contradictory policy of Russia Today, whose Russian-language edition in 2021 started an intensive campaign in support for COVID-19 vaccination, while at the same time other language versions (German, Spanish, English etc.) run equally aggressive campaign against these vaccinations, sharing anti-vaccination misinformation targeted at these audiences. Lybov Sobol and other journalists pointed out even if RT leadership believes these news streams are targeted at separate audiences, Russian anti-vaccination community is promptly picking up stories published in foreign RT editions and translates them back into Russian and uses for domestic anti-vaccine propaganda.

=== Number of cases in the recovery register ===
In June 2021 Deputy Digital Development Minister Oleg Kachanov quoted data from official record of recoveries in the context of its integration with database used for issuance of "COVID passport" certificates, and the database had 9 million recoveries recorded, which was almost twice as the official case statistics (5 million) at that time.

Further analysis of crowdsourced recovery certificate numbers (which were sequentially numbered) by physicist Sergey Shpilkin indicated that the total number of recoveries in the register exceeds 29 millions, which is 4.5x higher than the official number of cases from the beginning of pandemics (6 million).

== See also ==
- COVID-19 pandemic by country
- COVID-19 pandemic in Europe
- COVID-19 pandemic in Asia
- Coronavir
- Sputnik V COVID-19 vaccine
- 2020 in Russia
