= Viktor Yelensky =

Ukrainian scholar and politician

- Віктор Єленський
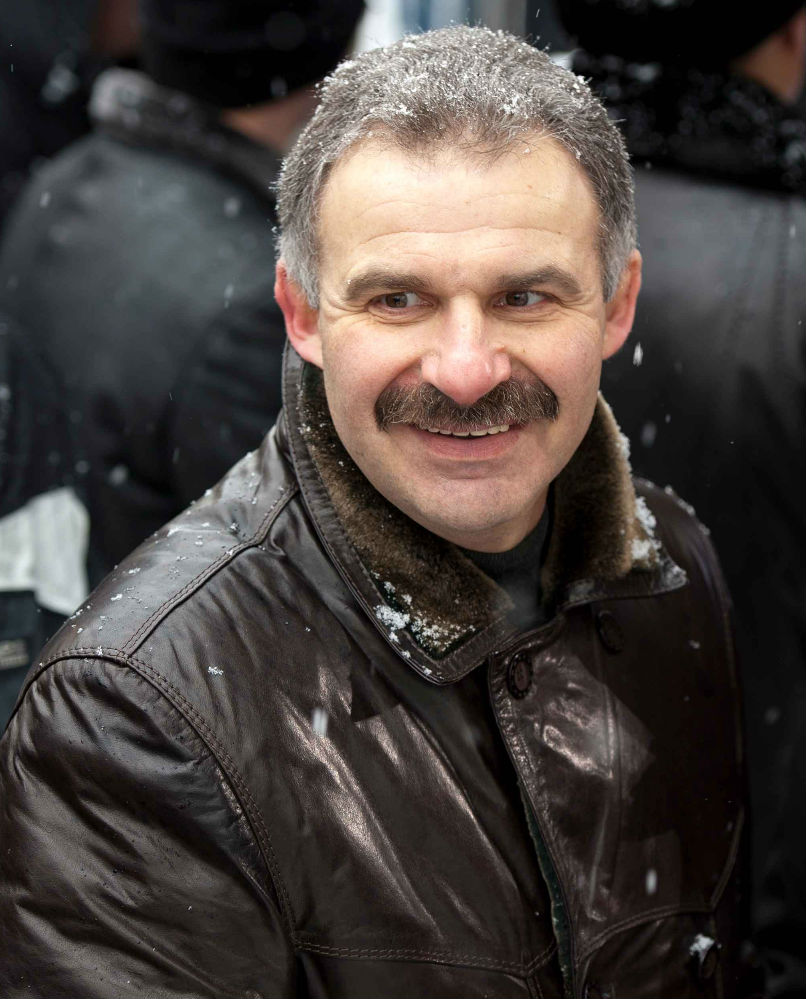
- Born: March 26, 1957 (age 69); Chadan, Tuvan Autonomous Oblast, Russian SFSR, USSR
- Education: Faculty of History, Kyiv University
- Years active: 1980–present
- Known for: scientist, religious scholar, publicist, teacher
- Awards: Order of Merit

Viktor Yevhenovych Yelensky (Ukrainian: Віктор Євгенович Єленський; born March 26, 1957, Chadan) is a Ukrainian scholar and public figure, an expert in religious studies, Doctor of Philosophical Sciences, Professor. He was a member of the Ukrainian Parliament (the Verkhovna Rada of Ukraine) of the 8th convocation.

== Biography ==
Viktor Yelensky was born on March 26, 1957, in Chadan, Tuva Region. The same year, the family returned to their native city of Kyiv. In this city, Viktor graduated from high school No. 85. In 1974, he became a student at the Kyiv National Taras Shevchenko University (Faculty of History).

During 1975–1977, Viktor Yelensky served in the Soviet Army. In 1986, as a reserve officer, Viktor was involved in the emergency response to the Chernobyl disaster, where, in the ranks of the 731st Special Protection Battalion, he worked in a particularly dangerous zone.

In 2018, he was awarded the Order of Merit of Grade III (State Award of Ukraine).

=== Education ===
In 1982, Viktor Yelensky graduated with honors from the Department of History of the Taras Shevchenko National University of Kyiv.

In 1989, he defended his PhD thesis in philosophy for the scientific degree of the candidate of science with the research topic Protestantism in the process of social adaptation to the conditions of Soviet society. In 2003 he successfully protected at Institute of Philosophy of National Academy of Science the thesis for a Doctor's degree in Philosophy on the subject Religious and social changes in the process of post-communist transformation: Ukraine in the Central-Eastern European context and the degree of the Doctor of Science was appropriated to him.

He has interned at Columbia University (New York, USA, 1998) and Nijmegen University (Netherlands, 2003).

Viktor Yelensky was a member of the Fulbright Scholar Program 2003–2004. Within 2004 he worked at Brigham Young University (Utah, USA), where he read a training course and studied the problems of religious freedom and national identity.

== Professional activities ==
After graduating from the university, since 1982 Viktor Yelensky worked as an inspector of the Council for Religious Affairs under the Cabinet of Ministers of the USSR. During 1987–1990 he headed the department of worldview culture of the Republican Center for Spiritual Culture.

From 1991 to 1992 he worked as a researcher at the Institute of Sociology of the NAS of Ukraine. During 1992–2010, he was a leading contributor to the Gregory Skovoroda Institute of Philosophy of the Academy of Sciences of Ukraine.

In 1996 Yelensky became a member of the International Society for the Sociology of Religion, and since 2001 he is the President of the Ukrainian Association of Religious Freedom.

Yelensky headed the Ukrainian journal for religious studies "Lyudina i Svit" ("Human Being and the World", 1995–2004) and lead the Kyiv Bureau of Radio Liberty (2005–2008). Also on the radio he was the host of the program "Freedom of Conscience".

Prof. Yelensky taught at the Ukrainian Catholic University (Professor, 2010–2014, Head of Department of Theology). and at the Diplomatic Academy at the Ministry of Foreign Affairs of Ukraine (Professor, since 2005). Since 2011 he has been served as Director of the Center for the Study of Religion at the Drahomanov National Pedagogical University (Professor, since 2011).

He is married, has a daughter, a son, grandchildren.

== Political activities ==
From March to October 2014, Yelensky worked as an adviser to Prime Minister of Ukraine Arseniy Yatsenyuk. In the 2014 Ukrainian parliamentary election, he was elected to the Ukrainian Parliament (VIII convocation) on the lists of the political party People's Front. He did not pass the (next) 2019 parliamentary elections, when he ran for political party "Ukrainian Strategy of Groysman".

In 2019 Yelensky was a member of the Ukrainian delegation to the Parliamentary Assembly of the Council of Europe. That year, in June, he headed another Ukrainian delegation that took part in the work of the Interparliamentary Assembly on Orthodoxy in Georgia. He supported Georgian protesters, who demanded deputies of the State Duma to leave the building of the Parliament of Georgia. He also condemned Russia's occupation of the territories of other Orthodox countries (Georgia, Moldova, Ukraine) and said that it undermined inter-Orthodox solidarity. Mr Yelensky was then attacked by members of the Russian delegation.

=== Parliamentary activities ===
In the Verkhovna Rada of the 8th convocation Viktor Yelensky was the Deputy Chairman of the Committee on Culture and Spirituality of the Verkhovna Rada of Ukraine (12/04/2014 – 08/28/2019), Chairman of the Subcommittee on State Policy on Freedom of Conscience and Religious Organizations (10/12/2014 – 08/28/2019). He participated in 96% of the meetings of the committee.

He is the author or co-author of laws aimed at the development of cultural industries, the preservation of cultural heritage, and the implementation of constitutional guarantees of freedom of conscience. Among them were the following acts: "On Amendments to Some Laws of Ukraine on Volunteer Activity", "On State Support for Cinematography in Ukraine", "On Amendments to Some Laws of Ukraine (Establishing Educational Institutions by Religious Organizations)", "On Amendments to the Law of Ukraine 'On Protection of Cultural Heritage' (on granting the status of the Marine Memorial underwater cultural heritage objects)", "On Amendments to Certain Laws of Ukraine (Concerning the Jurisdiction of Religious Organizations and the Procedure for State Registration of Religious Organizations with Legal Entity Status)".

The latter Law was severely criticized by the Head of Moscow Patriarchate personally while Russian Orthodox religious dissident protodeacon Andrei Kuraev called it "beautiful".

On November 1, 2018, the Government of the Russian Federation included Viktor Yelensky in the list of sanctioned persons.

According to Voxukraine's iMoRe Index, which characterizes the government's efforts to implement reforms, Viktor Yelensky ranks 21st in support of reform bills among 415 MPs of the 8th convocation.

Yelensky took part in the July 2019 Ukrainian parliamentary election with the party Ukrainian Strategy of Groysman. But he was not elected to parliament as the party did not win any seats (it won 2.41% of the national vote).

== Academic activities ==
Viktor Yelensky is the author of books, academic works and publications published outside Ukraine. Among these countries are: Belgium, United Kingdom, Italy, Germany, Switzerland, Poland, USA. Research interests: Church-State Relations, Religion and Globalization, Religion and Conflict, Sociology and Political Science of Religion.

He represents Ukraine in the international project REVACERN (Religions and values: Central and Eastern European research network).

=== Academic works ===
Monographs

- В. Єленський. Велике повернення: релігія у глобальній політиці та міжнародних відносинах кінця ХХ – початку ХХІ століття [The Great Return: Religion in Global Politics and International Relations of the late XX – early XXI Centuries]. — Львів: Видавництво УКУ, 2013. — 504 с. — ISBN 978-966-2778-01-4 (in Ukrainian)
- В. Єленський. Релігія після комунізму. Релігійно-соціальні зміни в процесі трансформації центрально- і східноєвропейських суспільств: фокус на Україні [Religion after Communism. Religious and Social Changes in the Process of Transformation of Central and Eastern European Societies: Focus on Ukraine]. — К. : НПУ ім. М. П. Драгоманова, 2002. — 420 с. — ISBN 966-660-087-0 (in Ukrainian)

Other books

- В. Єленський, В. Перебенесюк. Релігія. Церква. Молодь [Religion. Church. Youth]. — К. : А.Л.Д., 1996. — 160 с. — ISBN 5-7707-9790-8 (in Ukrainian)
- В. Єленський, О. Саган. Саєнтологія в Україні: віровчення і практика релігійної організації "Церква Саєнтології" та відповідність форм і методів її діяльності чинному в Україні законодавству [Scientology in Ukraine: the doctrine and practice of the religious organization "Church of Scientology" and conformity of the forms and methods of its activity with the legislation in force in Ukraine]. — К. : Швидкий Рух, 2004. — 80 с. — ISBN 966-8453-00-3 (in Ukrainian)
