= Kamby Lama of Tuva =

Highest Buddhist religious authority in Tuva

- Камбы-лама
- Incumbent; Gelek Natsyk Dorju since June 23, 2020
- Residence: Tuva
- Appointer: Elected for five year term
- Formation: October 1997
- First holder: Aganak Khertek

The Kamby Lama of Tuva, or Supreme Lama of Tuva, is the highest Buddhist religious authority and most senior Buddhist monastic lama in Tuva, a largely Buddhist republic of Russia. The Kamby Lama is considered the leader of all Tuvan Buddhists. The institute and title of Kamby Lama was revived in October 1997 during the resurgence of Buddhism in Tuva following the collapse of the Soviet Union. Buddhism had been suppressed in Tuva throughout the Soviet era.

Following the death of the 8th Kamby Lama, Jampel Lodoy, on June 23, 2020, Gelek Natsyk Dorju was elected as his successor on October 4, 2020

== History ==
Following the fall of the Soviet Union, Kazak Orgudaevich Sandak (1918–1997) performed the duties of Supreme Lama of Tuva from 1991 until his death in 1997, but he did not possess the title of Kamby Lama.

The position of Kamby Lama of Tuva, or Supreme Lama, was officially revived and created in October 1997. The Kamby Lama is democratically elected by a congress, or Khural, of Tuvan Buddhist clergy and religious leaders for a five-year term. Elections take place every five years, unless the incumbent Kamby Lama resigns or dies in office.

Aganak Khertek was elected as the first official Kamby Lama in October 1997. However, Khertek when stepped down as Kamby Lama during his term to continue his Buddhist education in India, Tibetan monk Pende Gyaltsen briefly served as acting Kamby Lama at the request of the Tuvan Buddhist community.

Tuva's most recent Supreme Lama, Jampel Lodoy (born Apysh-ool Sat, 1975–2020), served as the 8th Kamby Lama from November 29, 2019, until his death on June 23, 2020, from COVID-19 during the pandemic in Russia. Had he survived COVID-19, Jampel Lodoy would have served as Kamby Lama until the end of his term in 2024. The late Jampel Lodoy had also served as the 5th Kamby Lama from 2005 to 2010.

Following Jampel Lodoy's death, it was announced that Omak Bashky would temporarily assume the role of acting leader of Tuva's community Buddhist community until a new Kamby Lama is chosen. The 9th Kamby Lama is expected to be elected in early Fall 2020.

== Kamby Lama ==
The position of Kamby Lama was officially revived in 1997. There have been eight Kamby Lamas between 1997 and 2020. The Kamby Lama is elected on a democratic basis for a five-year term.

Order	Name	Term Began	Term Ended	Notes
Acting	Kazak Orgudaevich Sandak	1991	1997	Kazak Orgudaevich Sandak was the first Buddhist monk to perform the duties of Supreme Lama of Tuva, the senior Buddhist monastic lama, during the post-Soviet era, but was not given the title of Kamby Lama.
1 (Khertek) & 2 (Gyaltsen)	Aganak Khertek and Pende Gyaltsen (acting)	1997	2000	The position of Kamby Lama was revived in October 1997. Aganak Schorsovich Khertek was elected as the first official Kamby Lama of Tuva in October 1997 (and second Supreme Lama overall after Sandak, his predecessor). During his tenure, Khertek resigned as Kamby Lama in order to move to India and continue his Buddhist religious education. In his absence, a Tibetan monk named Pende Gyaltsen acted as Kamby Lama during Khertek's term at the request of the Tuvan Buddhist sangha (community).
3	Yeshe Dagpa	2000	2002	Born Dolaan Kuular, Yeshe Dagpa was the third Kamby Lama. Yeshe Dagpa stepped down as Kamby Lama in 2002.
4	Lobsan Tubden	March 28, 2002	2005	Born Mart-ool Nikolaevich Norbu-Sambu. Official elected the 4th Kamby Lama on March 28, 2002.
5	Jampel Lodoy	2005	2010	Born Apysh-ool Sat on August 21, 1975, in Hondergey, Dzun-Khemchiksky District, Tuva. In some translations, his name is also spelled Dzhampel Lodoi or Jambal Lodoi. This was Jampel Lodoy's first tenure as Kamby Lama. He was enthroned as the 5th Kamby Lama on April 30, 2005. Jampel was later elected the 8th Kamby Lama in November 2019.
6	Suldum Bashky	March 12, 2010 (elected)	September 11, 2014	Also known as Tsultim Tenzin, Supreme Lama Suldum Bashky was one of the oldest lamas in Tuva when he was elected Kamby Lama on March 12, 2010. Bashki defeated three other candidates - incumbent Kamby Lama Jambel Lodoy, Bolat-ool Mergen (the representative of the Aldyn Huree Buddhist temple in Chadan), and Lama Suldum Bashky. Kampy Lama Suldum Bashky died in office on September 11, 2014.
7	Lobsan Chamzy	November 13, 2014	November 29, 2019	The Seventh Kamby Lama, Lobsan Chamzy, was born Bayir-ool Serenovich Shyyrap in 1976. Following the death of Kamby Lama Suldum Bashki in September 2014, a special congress of 76 Buddhist clergy and representatives of Buddhist organizations gathered in Kyzyl in November 2014 to elected Tuva's new Supreme Lama. Five candidates were nominated for Kamby Lama, but Shyyrap won the majority of votes in the second round. His enthronement was held in December 2014. Lobsan Chamzy was nominated for a second full term in the November 2019 election, but lost to Jampel Lodoy.
8	Jampel Lodoy	November 29, 2019 (elected)	June 23, 2020	Also sometimes spelled Dzhampel Lodoi or Jambal Lodoi. Jampel Lodoy previously served as Kamby Lama from 2005 until 2010. He was elected as the eighth Kamby Lama on November 29, 2019, by the Buddgist congress held at Tsechenling Buddhist temple. Jampel Lodoy was enthroned in a ceremony held at the Tuvan Ministry of Culture's House of Folk Art in Kyzyl on December 19, 2019. He served as the 8th Kamby Lama until his death from COVID-19 during the coronavirus pandemic on June 23, 2020, at the age of 44.
9	Gelek Natsyk Dorju (Сарыглар Сергек Олегович, Sergek Olegovich Saryglar)	4. Oct. 2020		
