= Vladimir Lopukhin =

Russian politician (1952–2020)

- Владимир Лопухин
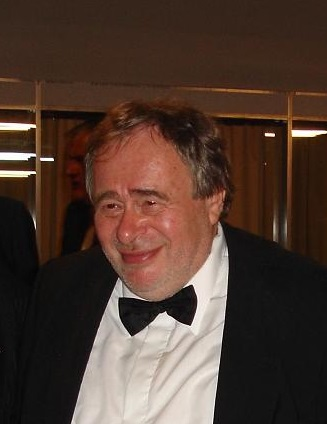
- Lopukhin in 2008

Minister of Fuel and Energy of Russia
- In office 16 May 1992 – 30 May 1992
- President: Boris Yeltsin
- Preceded by: Himself (as Minister of the RSFSR)
- Succeeded by: Viktor Chernomyrdin

Minister of Fuel and Energy of the RSFSR
- In office 10 November 1991 – 16 May 1992
- President: Boris Yeltsin
- Preceded by: Anatoly Dyakov
- Succeeded by: Himself (as Minister of Russia)

Personal details
- Born: Vladimir Mikhailovich Lopukhin; 23 May 1952 Moscow, Russian SFSR, USSR
- Died: 26 May 2020 (aged 68) Moscow, Russia
- Education: Moscow State University

Vladimir Mikhailovich Lopukhin (Russian: Влади́мир Миха́йлович Лопухи́н; 23 May 1952 – 26 May 2020) was a Russian economist and politician. He served as 1st Minister of Fuel and Energy of the Russian Federation from 1991 to 1992.

== Life ==
Lopukhin was born in Moscow and graduated from the Faculty of Economics of Moscow State University in 1975. From November 1991 until June 1992, he held the position of 1st Minister of Fuel and Energy of the Russian Federation. He was appointed as an adviser to Russian Prime Minister Yegor Gaidar in the fall of 1992, and also worked as partner of Lazard from 1992 until 1996.

Lopukhin died in Moscow in May 2020, three days after his 68th birthday, after contracting COVID-19 during the COVID-19 pandemic in Russia.
