= Anatoly Vishnevsky =

Russian demographer and economist (1935–2021)

- Анатолий Вишневский
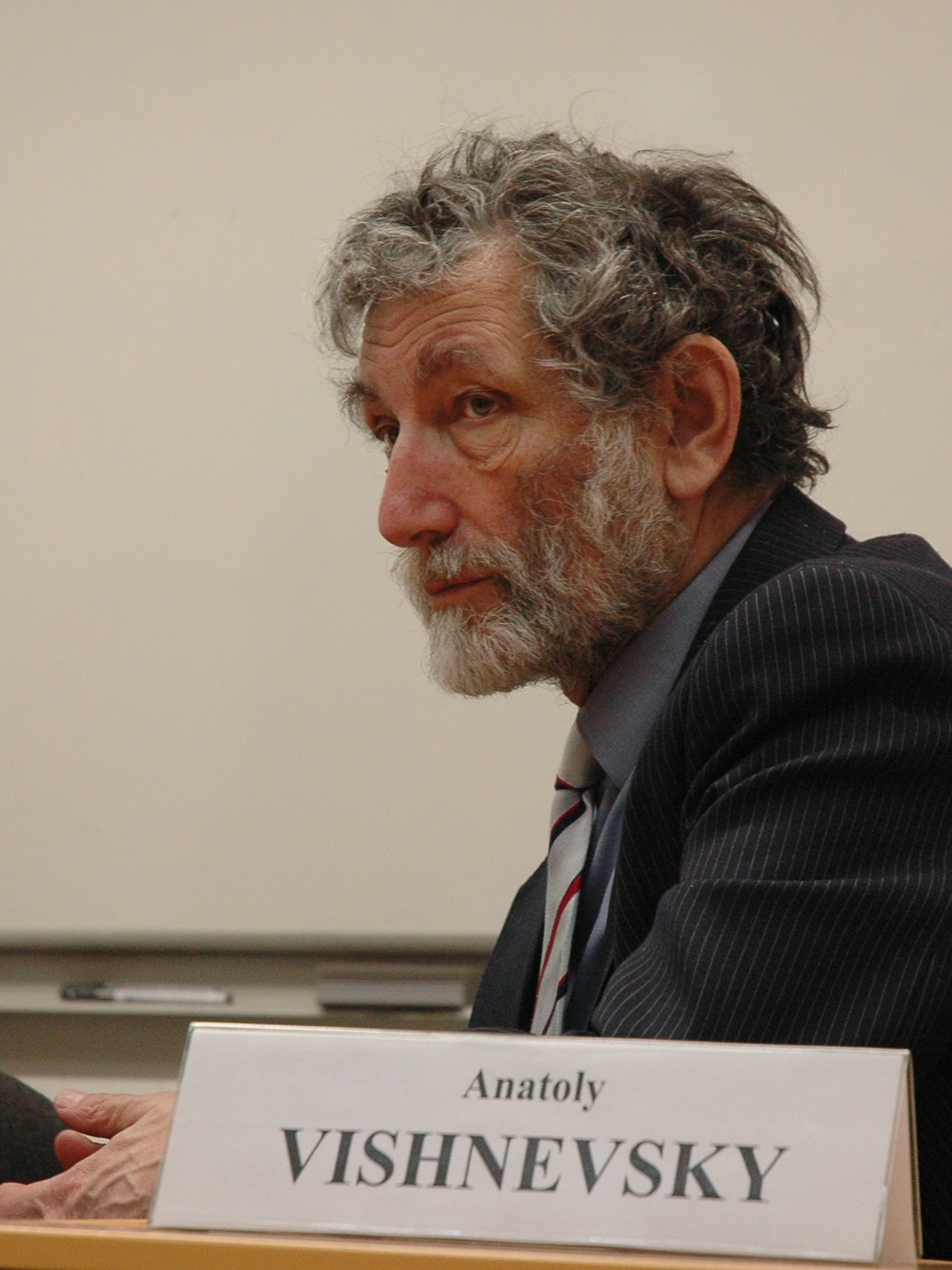
- Vishnevsky in 2007
- Born: 1 April 1935; Kharkiv, Kharkiv Oblast, Ukrainian SSR
- Died: 15 January 2021 (aged 85); Moscow, Russia
- Occupations: Demographer; Economist

Anatoly Vishnevsky (1 April 1935 – 15 January 2021) was a Russian demographer and economist. He also wrote novels.

== Biography ==
Vishnevsky earned a doctorate in economics in 1983, which would later effectively make him a member of the Russian Academy of Natural Sciences. He directed the Institute of Demography at the Higher School of Economics.

Vishnevsky was editor-in-chief of the information bulletin "Population and Society" and of the online journal "Demoscope Weekly". He was also a writer and historian of the White émigré. He was a teacher in Ukraine, which at the time was a part of the USSR. He graduated from the National University of Kharkiv in 1958 with a degree in statistics. In 1967, he defended a thesis titled "Urban agglomerations and the economic regulation of their growth" at the Central Economic Mathematical Institute. In 1971, he moved to Moscow and began working at the USSR Demographic Research Institute.

In 1990, Vishnevsky worked in France as a visiting professor at Lumière University Lyon 2, the University of Paris 8 Vincennes-Saint-Denis, and Sciences Po. He was an active member of several councils and committees, such as the Management of Social Transformations (MOST) program of UNESCO. On 27 April 2010, the Higher School of Economics celebrated his 75th birthday.

Anatoly Vishnevsky died in Moscow on 15 January 2021, at the age of 85 from COVID-19.
