= Pierre Sabatier =

French physicist (1935–2023)

Pierre Célestin Sabatier (11 July 1935 – 13 July 2023) was a French physicist.

He was born in Casablanca, Morocco. The grand-nephew of François Nau, Sabatier graduated from École Normale Supérieure, Paris in physics and mathematics in 1958 then spent a year in Princeton University where he was a pupil of Professor Eugene Wigner. He was awarded his doctorate at the Paris-Sud 11 University in 1966. He had worked on scattering theory, and, during the two years he had to serve in the French Navy, on coastal engineering and applied geophysics. His conclusions of the first interdisciplinary meeting on Inverse Problems (published in "Mathematics of Profile Inversion", L. Colin, Editor. NASA TM X-62, 1971) proved to be correctly predictive up to now.

Sabatier was president of the 20th section (nuclear and particle physics) of the Conseil supérieur des Universités (1976–1983; later called CNU, and where he served almost 20 years), the founding editor of the journal Inverse Problems, IOP, 1985–20??, he initiated the RCP264 workshops in Montpellier, and is one of the foremost exponents of the field of inverse problems (see Inverse Problem). He published almost 200 articles and books, in domains going from pure mathematics to earth and ocean sciences, in particular the authoritative book on "Inverse Problems of Quantum Scattering Theory", coauthored with K.Chadan (2nd English Edition, Springer 1989), and the encyclopedic one on "Scattering", coedited with E. R. Pike (Academic Press 2002).

Sabatier was a distinguished professor at Montpellier University, distinguished lecturer in physics of the University of Alberta (from 1993), Doctor honoris causa of the University of Lecce (from 1992), Fellow of the Institute of Physics (IOP), and later served on the boards of two journals: Inverse Problems and Inverse and ill-posed Problems. He later published memories in Rêves et Combats d'un enseignant-chercheur. Retour Inverse. (L'Harmattan 2012).

Pierre Sabatier died in Paris, at the age of 88.

== Sources ==
- Mario Bertero; Jean Guy Caputo; F Alberto Grünbaum; Frank Natterer (1 August 2001). "Editorial - Pierre Sabatier". Inverse Problems. 17 (4). doi:10.1088/0266-5611/17/4/001.
