= Dzun-Khemchiksky District =

Dzun-Khemchiksky District Дзун-Хемчикский кожуун (Russian)
- District

Other transcription(s)
  - Tuvan: Чөөн-Хемчик кожуун
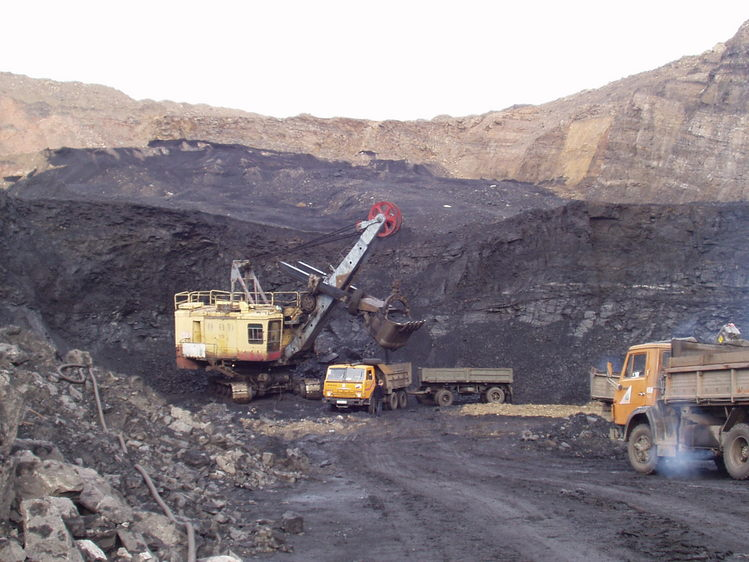
- Chadan coal mine, Dzun-Khemchiksky District

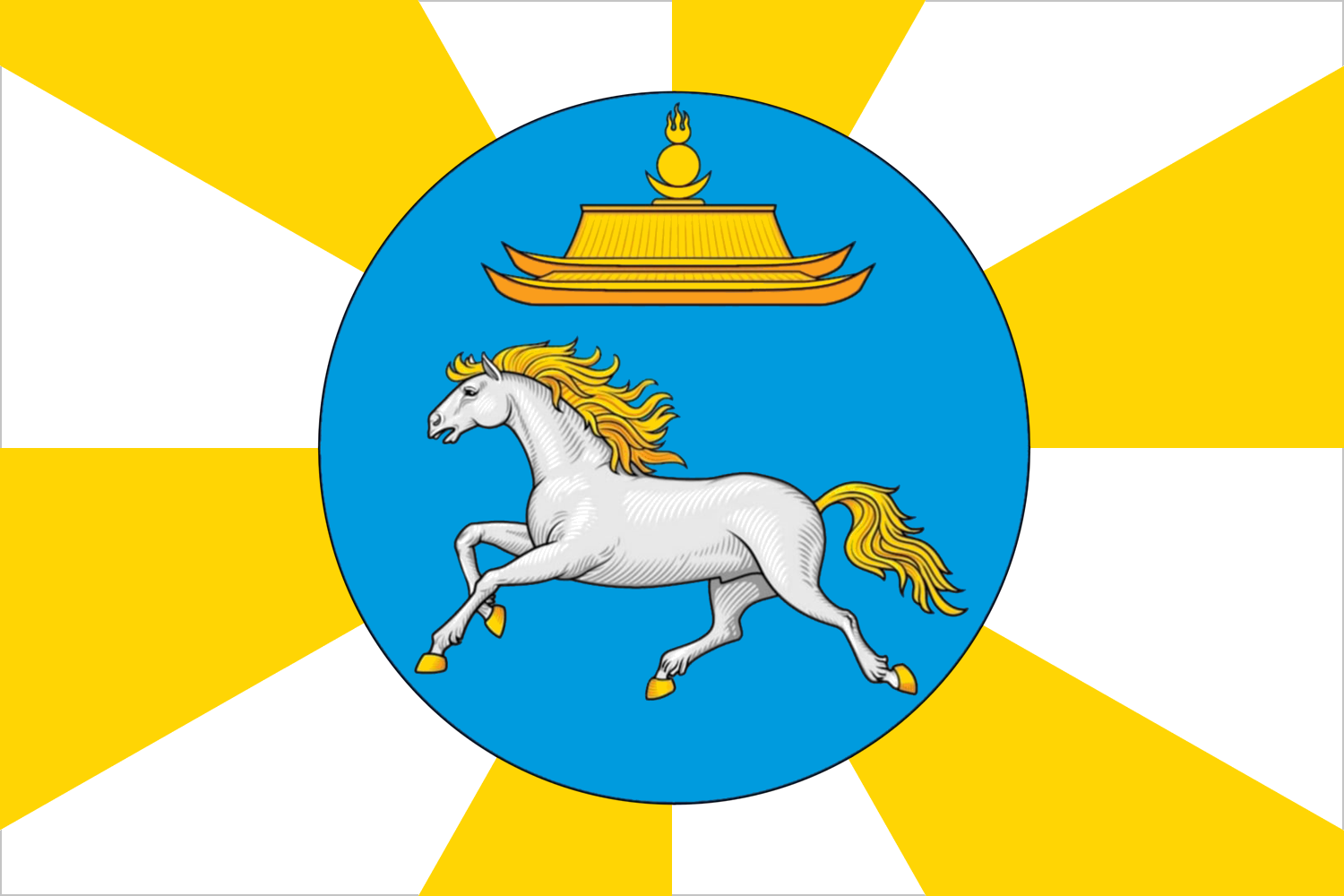
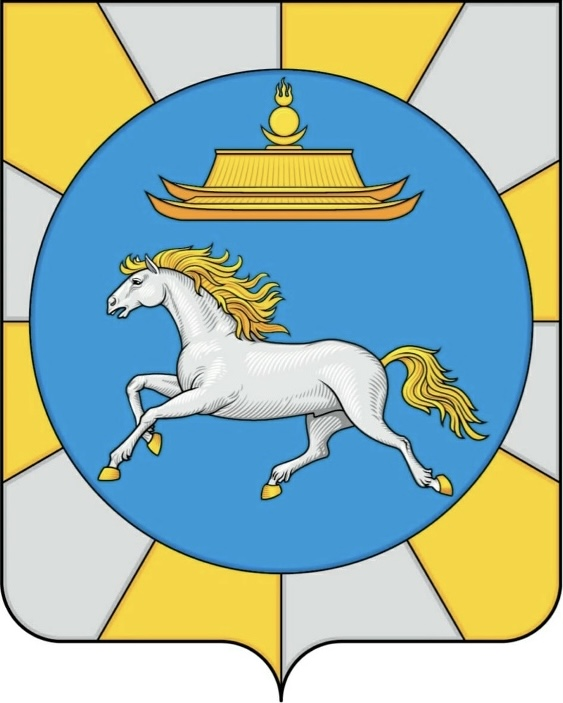
- Flag Coat of arms
- Location of Dzun-Khemchiksky District in the Tuva Republic
- Coordinates: 51.007°N 91.020°E
- Country: Russia
- Federal subject: Tuva Republic
- Established: 1929
- Administrative center: Chadan

Area
  - Total: 6,484.56 km^{2} (2,503.70 sq mi)

Population (2010 Census)
  - Total: 19,918
  - Density: 3.0716/km^{2} (7.9554/sq mi)
  - Urban: 45.4%
  - Rural: 54.6%

Administrative structure
  - Administrative divisions: 1 Towns under district jurisdiction (urban settlements), 11 Sumons
  - Inhabited localities: 1 cities/towns, 12 rural localities

Municipal structure
  - Municipally incorporated as: Dzun-Khemchiksky Municipal District
  - Municipal divisions: 1 urban settlements, 11 rural settlements
- Time zone: UTC+7 (MSK+4)
- OKTMO ID: 93615000
- Website: http://dzun.tuva.ru/

Dzun-Khemchiksky District (Russian: Дзун-Хемчи́кский кожуун; Tuvan: Чөөн-Хемчик кожуун, romanized: Çöön-Xemçik kojûn) is an administrative and municipal district (raion, or kozhuun), one of the seventeen in the Tuva Republic, Russia. It is located in the west of the republic. The area of the district is 6,484.56 square kilometers (2,503.70 sq mi). Its administrative center is the town of Chadan. Population: 19,918 (2010 census); 21,361 (2002 Census); 22,748 (1989 Soviet census). The population of Chadan accounts for 45.4% of the district's total population.
