= Chadan (town) =

Town in the Tuva Republic, Russia

Chadan Чадан
- Town

Other transcription(s)
  - Tuvan: Чадаана
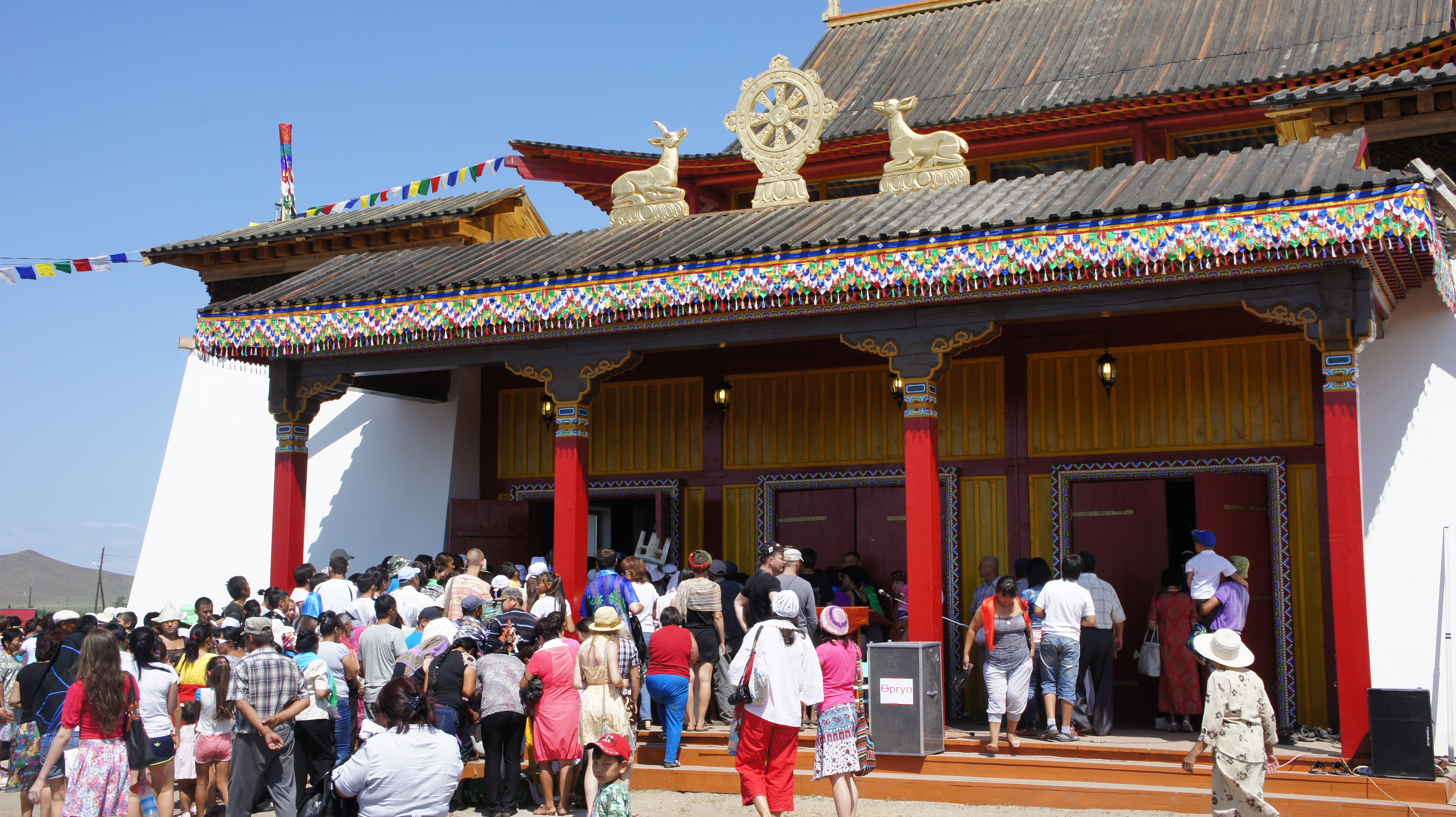
- Buddhist temple in Chadan

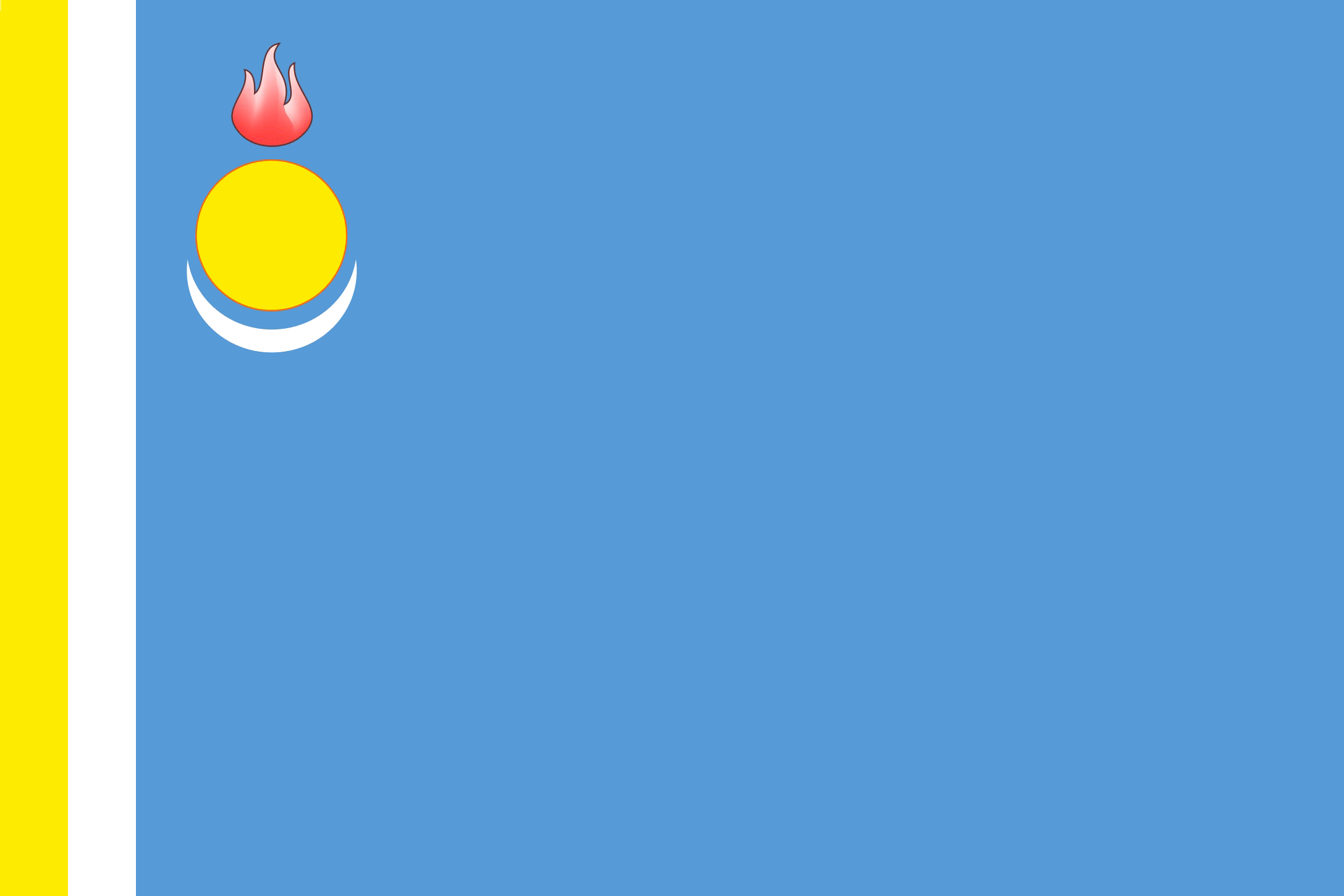
- Flag
- Interactive map of Chadan
- Location of Chadan Chadan (Tuva Republic)
- Coordinates: 51°17′N 91°35′E
- Country: Russia
- Federal subject: Tuva
- Administrative district: Dzun-Khemchiksky District
- Town under district jurisdictionSelsoviet: Chadan
- Founded: 1873
- Town status since: 1945
- Elevation: 810 m (2,660 ft)

Population (2010 Census)
  - Total: 9,035
  - Estimate (2021): 9,732 (+7.7%)

Administrative status
  - Capital of: Dzun-Khemchiksky District, Chadan Town Under District Jurisdiction

Municipal status
  - Municipal district: Dzun-Khemchiksky Municipal District
  - Urban settlement: Chadan Urban Settlement
  - Capital of: Dzun-Khemchiksky Municipal District, Chadan Urban Settlement
- Time zone: UTC+7 (MSK+4)
- Postal codes: 668110, 668111, 668118
- Dialing code: +7 39434
- OKTMO ID: 93615101001

Chadan population
- 2010 Census: 9,035
- 2002 Census: 9,454
- 1989 Census: 10,775
- 1979 Census: 8,985

Chadan (Russian: Чада́н; Tuvan: Чадаана, Çadaana) is a town and the administrative center of Dzun-Khemchiksky District in the Tuva Republic, Russia, located on the Chadan River (in the Yenisei's basin), 224 kilometers (139 mi) west of Kyzyl, the capital of the republic. As of the 2010 Census, its population was 9,035. The former Russian Defense Minister Sergei Shoigu was born in Chadan.

== History ==
In 1873, at the confluence of Khondergey and Chadan Rivers, a Buddhist monastery called Aldee-Khuree was founded. This year is considered the founding year of Chadan. Under the rule of both the Qing and the Republic of China, it was known as Jiada (Chinese: 加大).

In 1923, the village by the monastery was known as Artadyt. In January 1929, when the Plenum Tuvan People's Revolutionary Party adopted an anti-religious decree, the Aldee-Khuree monastery was closed and destroyed, and the village was renamed Chadan.

In May 1945, Chadan was granted town status and became the administrative center of Dzun-Khemchiksky District. Around this time, coal deposits were discovered nearby and with open-pit mining starting soon after.

== Administrative and municipal status ==
Within the framework of administrative divisions, Chadan serves as the administrative center of Dzun-Khemchiksky District. As an administrative division, it is, together with one rural locality (the arban of Kirsaray), incorporated within Dzun-Khemchiksky District as Chadan Town Under District Jurisdiction. As a municipal division, Chadan Town Under District Jurisdiction is incorporated within Dzun-Khemchiksky Municipal District as Chadan Urban Settlement.

== Economy ==
There are bread-making and a butter-making plants in the town. Coal is mined in the town's vicinity.

== Culture ==
In the Khemchic Valley, 7 km outside town, stands a stubby mud wall decorated with a portrait of the Dalai Lama. That's all that remains of the original Ustuu-Khuree Buddhist temple which had been built in between 1905 and 1908 on the orders of Khaidyp, the local tribal ruler. Khaidyp's adopted son, Mongush Buyan-Badirgi later rose to become independent Tuva's founder and first prime minister. Thus the monastery became a place of considerable influence in Tuvan culture: The first Tuvan coin was minted here and it was a monk from the temple (Mongush Lopsang-Chinmit) who formulated the Latin-based script for the Tuvan language that was used from 1930 to 1943. After the communist coup that ousted Buyan-Badirgi, the temple buildings were mostly destroyed (1937) and the monks exiled or executed.

Since 1999, Chadan has been the site for the annual Ustuu-Khuree festival, originally founded to fund the reconstruction of the Ustuu-Khuree Temple. In 2008 the institution was refounded - assisted by local-born Sergei Shoigu, then Russia's minister of Emergency Situations (and later Defence Minister). The temple finally reopened in 2012 under the guidance of chief monk Jampel Lodoy who would later ascend to the position of Tuva's Kamby Lama, the republic's highest position in the Buddhist clergy.

== Notable people ==
- Sergei Shoigu, Secretary of the Security Council of Russia
- Nurislam Sanayev, Olympic freestyle wrestler
