= Party of Russian Unity and Accord =

Party of Russian Unity and Accord Партия российского единства и согласия
- Abbreviation: PRES
- Leader: Sergey Shakhray
- Founders: Sergey Shakhray; Alexander Shokhin; Ramazan Abdulatipov; Yuri Kalmykov; Sergey Filatov; Sergei Stankevich; Konstantin Zatulin
- Founded: 17 August 1993
- Registered: 21 October 1993
- Dissolved: 27 May 2000
- Merged into: Unity
- Headquarters: 107005, Moscow, Baumanskaya St., 50/2
- Membership (1995): 31,000
- Ideology: Conservatism; Federalism; Regionalism
- Political position: Centre to centre-right
- Colours: Dark blue Light blue Red
- State Duma (1993): 22 / 450
- State Duma (1995): 1 / 450

The Party of Russian Unity and Accord (PRES; Russian: Партия российского единства и согласия, romanized: Partiya rossiyskogo yedinstva i soglasiya, ПРЕС) was a conservative and federalist political party in Russia in the 1990s, led by Minister of Nationalities Sergey Shakhray. Throughout its existence, PRES supported the policies of President Boris Yeltsin and Prime Minister Viktor Chernomyrdin, many PRES members also held ministerial positions, and the party itself was described as an attempt to create a "small party of power."

== History ==
=== Background ===
At the end of 1992, the Russian Minister for Nationalities and Regional Policy, Sergey Shakhray, announced preparations for the creation of his own party, which "will avoid any radicalism and the predominance of 'Moscow families'". Deputy Prime Minister Alexander Shokhin, former Chairman of the Council of Nationalities of the Supreme Soviet Ramazan Abdulatipov, Minister of Justice Yuri Kalmykov, Kremlin Chief of Staff Sergey Filatov, Presidential advisor Sergei Stankevich, Chairman of the "Entrepreneurs for a New Russia" association Konstantin Zatulin, and other government-affiliated personalities joined Shakhray's project.

=== Foundation ===
On 17 June 1993, Shakhray, attending the congress of the "Entrepreneurs for a New Russia" association, announced that he was beginning to create the Party of Russian Unity and Harmony, which, according to him, "will rely on the political and economic forces of the regions and support the President of the Russian Federation".

On 17 August 1993, the founding conference of the party was held in Novgorod, where the program was adopted and the Federal Council was elected, which included Shakhray, Shokhin, Abdulatipov, Stankevich, Alexander Kotenkov, Governor of Novgorod Oblast Mikhail Prusak and others. The party was registered by Ministry of Justice on 21 October 1993.

On 26 October 1993, the PRES Federal Council nominated a federal candidates list for the 1993 State Duma elections. The list included four incumbent ministers: Shakhray, Shokhin, Kalmykov, and Gennady Melikyan. The association "Entrepreneurs for a New Russia," headed by Konstantin Zatulin, also informally joined the PRES.

=== 1st State Duma ===
In the 1993 Russian legislative election, PRES received 6.73% of the votes on party lists and 22 seats out of 450 in the 1st State Duma. Five members of the PRES were elected to the Federation Council. At the beginning of the State Duma's term, the PRES faction expanded to 30-33 deputies. During 1994-1995 the party fell into decline: In 1994, Konstantin Zatulin and Yuri Kalmykov were expelled from the party, the latter for disagreeing with the party's endorsement of the First Chechen War. In May 1995, Alexander Shokhin also left the party, and by the fall of 1995, its faction had halved to only 15 deputies.

At the party's first congress (February 26–27, 1994), Shakhray was elected chairman. The congress adopted the party's ideological program.

During the 1st State Duma, the PRES faction supported the government's budget proposals and blocked the opposition's attempts to pass a vote of no confidence in Chernomyrdin's cabinet. The party's most notable legislative initiative was the "Memorandum of Agreement," which, along with the resolution "On Declaring a Political and Economic Amnesty," was adopted by the State Duma on 23 February 1994. As a result, former GKChP members and participants in the 1993 constitutional crisis were amnestied and released, prompting sharp criticism of PRES from the liberal media press.

In April-May 1995, PRES took part in the creation of the Chernomydrin's Our Home – Russia (NDR) movement as a collective member, but left the NDR in early September 1995. According to estimates by the PRES leadership, in the summer of 1995 the party's membership was 31,000 people, and its regional organizations operated in 64 constituent entities of the Russian Federation. However, according to research, the actual number of party members did not exceed 3,000–5,000 people.

=== 2nd State Duma ===
On 16 September 1995, the party's pre-election congress was held, where a federal list of candidates was nominated, again headed by Sergey Shakhray. In the 1995 Russian legislative election, PRES received only 0.36% of the vote. Party leader Sergey Shakhray was elected in a single-mandate constituency. PRES Executive Committee Chairman Alexander Arinin won in a single-mandate constituency running as an independent candidate, while PRES member Insaf Saifullin was elected on the NDR list. In the 2nd State Duma, Shakhray joined the Russian Regions parliamentary group, while Arinin joined the NDR faction.

At the 3rd PRES Congress on 25 May 1996, the party supported incumbent president Boris Yeltsin in the 1996 Russian presidential election.

=== Dissolution ===
On 27 June 1998, the 4th and final PRES Congress took place, at which Shakhray announced the party's likely participation in the next State Duma election and the possible support of Yury Luzhkov or Alexander Lebed in the next presidential election. After the 4th Congress, the party effectively ceased operations, unable to find the funds to continue its existence. In 1999, Shakhray joined the Unity movement, and on 27 May 2000, the Unity congress announced its transformation into a political party, with the NDR, All Russia, and the PRES joining it. Shakhray was elected as a member of the Presidium of the Political Council of the Unity party. PRES was legally liquidated on 13 October 2006, by court order.

== Ideology ==
PRES billed itself as a "conservative party of Russia's regions", aiming to improve and optimize the federal structure under a "strong center." The party also advocated an "economic federalism" and socially-oriented market economy without an emphasis on state power. The party was created under the slogans of federalism and respect for the economic rights of the regions, but was described as essentially a centrist "departmental party" of Shakhray-headed Ministry of Nationalities.

During the 1993 election campaign, the PRES party presented itself as a conservative alternative to the Choice of Russia, while supporting the policies of Prime Minister Viktor Chernomyrdin.

In its documents, the party supported Boris Yeltsin's actions during the September-October 1993 Russian constitutional crisis, although its ranks also included some pro-parliamentary supporters, such as Ramazan Abdulatipov.

It had brought along Native siberian nationalist parties in Siberia, such as Khostug Tyva and Çon çobĕ as allies in the early 90s.

== Election results ==
=== State Duma ===
Election	Leader	Votes	%	Seats	+/–	Government
1993	Sergey Shakhray	3,620,035	6.73 (#7)	22 / 450	–	Coalition
1995	Sergey Shakhray	245,977	0.36 (#26)	1 / 450	▼21	Coalition (1995–1998)
1995	Sergey Shakhray	245,977	0.36 (#26)	1 / 450	▼21	Opposition (1998)
1995	Sergey Shakhray	245,977	0.36 (#26)	1 / 450	▼21	Coalition (1998–1999)

== See also ==
- Party of Russian Unity and Accord politicians
