= Tatar language =

Kipchak Turkic language

Tatar
- татар теле tatar tele تاتار تلىُ • تاتار تلی татарча • tatarça • تاتارچا
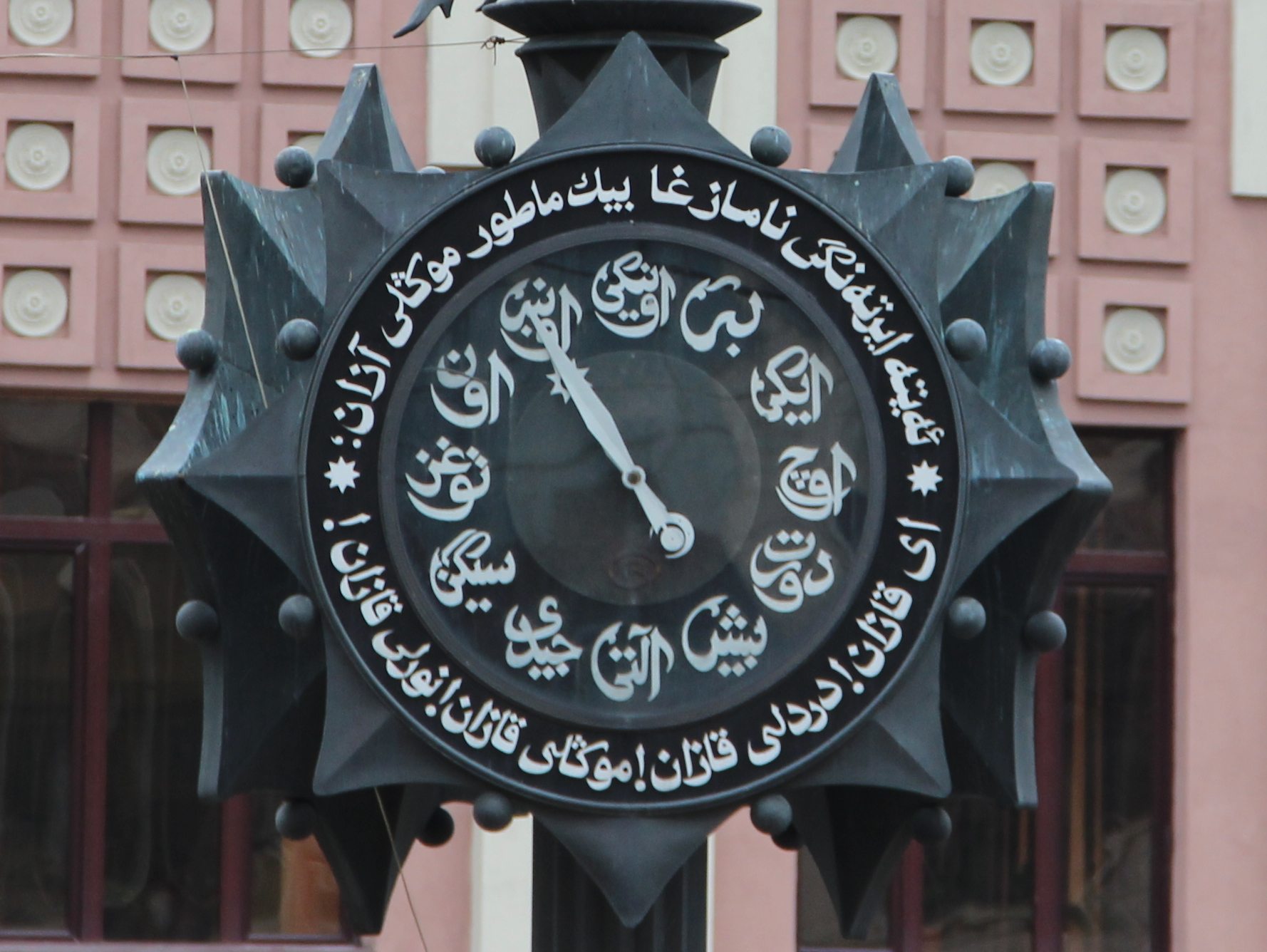
- A clock in Bauman Street, Kazan, depicting the traditional Arabic script
- Native to: Russia
- Region: Volga-Ural region
- Ethnicity: Volga Tatars, Qaratays
- Speakers: L1: 4 million (2020); L2: 810,000 (2020)
- Language family: Turkic: Common Turkic; Kipchak; Kipchak–Bulgar; Tatar
- Early form: Ural-Volga Turki
- Dialects: Kazan Tatar / Central (majority); Mishar Tatar / Western
- Writing system: Tatar alphabets (Cyrillic, Latin, Tatar Braille; historically Arabic)

Official status
- Official language in: Tatarstan (Russia)
- Recognised minority language in: China; Poland
- Regulated by: Institute of Language, Literature and Arts of the Academy of Sciences of the Republic of Tatarstan

Language codes
- ISO 639-1: tt
- ISO 639-2: tat
- ISO 639-3: tat
- Glottolog: tata1255
- Linguasphere: 44-AAB-be
- Tatar is classified as Vulnerable by the UNESCO Atlas of the World's Languages in Danger.

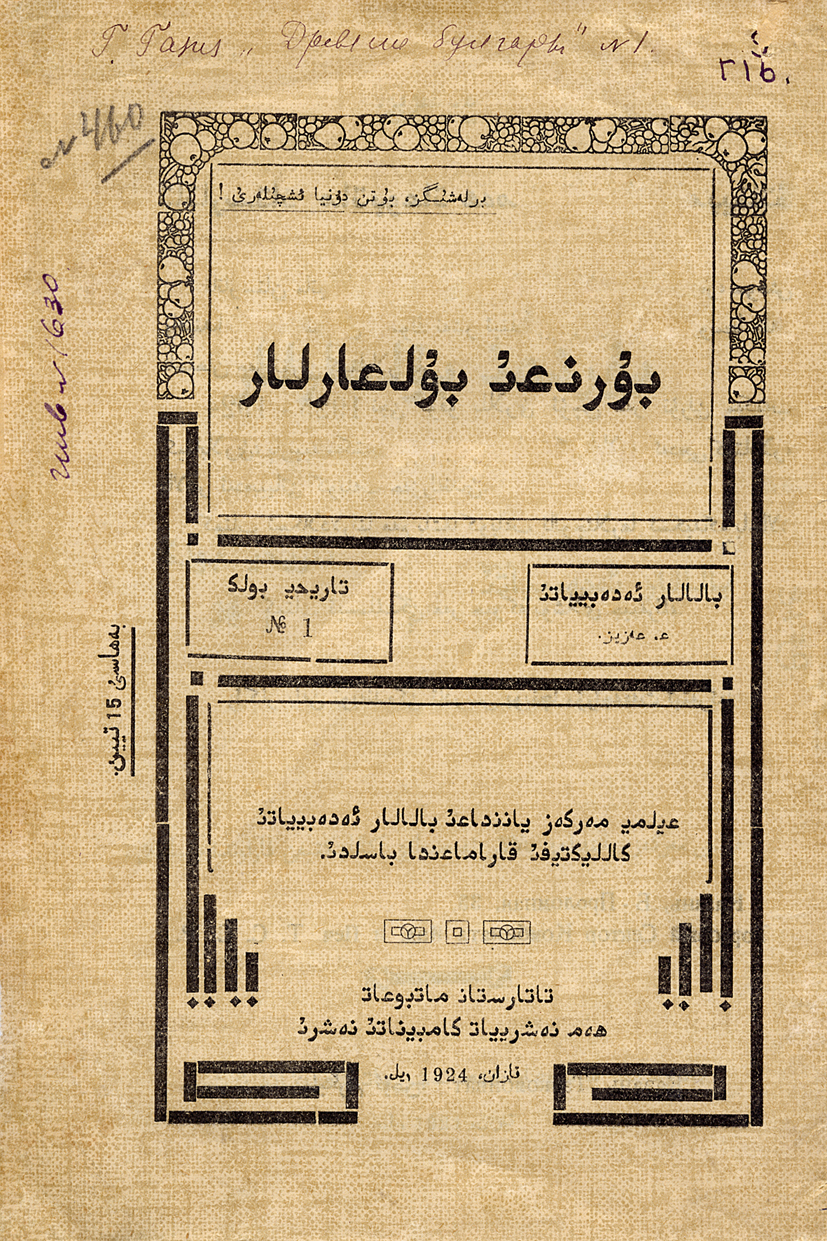
Tatar book written in the Arabic script entitled Ancient Bulgars (Borınğı bolğarlar, 1924)

Tatar (/ˈtɑːtər/ TAH-tər; Tatar: татар теле, romanized: tatar tele or татарча, romanized: tatarça) is a Turkic language spoken by the Tatars mainly located in the modern Republic of Tatarstan, wider Volga-Ural region, as well as many other regions of Russia. Tatar belongs to the Kipchak branch of Turkic languages, the same branch as Bashkir, Kazakh, Nogai and Kyrgyz.

The two main dialects of Tatar are the Central Dialect (urta / qazan; most common), and the Western Dialect (könbatış / mişər). The literary Tatar language is based on the Central Dialect and on a local variant of Türki. Tatar should not be confused with Crimean Tatar or Siberian Tatar, which are different languages, although also part of the Kipchak language group.

Like other Turkic languages, Tatar was traditionally written in the Arabic script for most of its history. Since 1939, the alphabet has been Cyrillic, though a number of Latin-based versions have also been used over the years.

== Geographic distribution ==
The Tatar language is spoken by about 5 million people. Most speakers live in Russia, but there are also communities in Azerbaijan, China, Finland, Georgia, Israel, Kazakhstan, Latvia, Lithuania, Romania, Turkey, Ukraine, the United States, Uzbekistan. Mordva's Qaratay group also speak a variant of Kazan Tatar.

In the 2010 census, 69% of Russian Tatars claimed at least some knowledge of the Tatar language. In Tatarstan, 93% of Tatars and 3.6% of Russians claimed to have at least some knowledge of the Tatar language. In neighbouring Bashkortostan, 67% of Tatars, 27% of Bashkirs, and 1.3% of Russians claimed to understand basic Tatar language.

=== Official status ===
The word Qazan – قازان is written in Arabic script in the semblance of a Zilant.

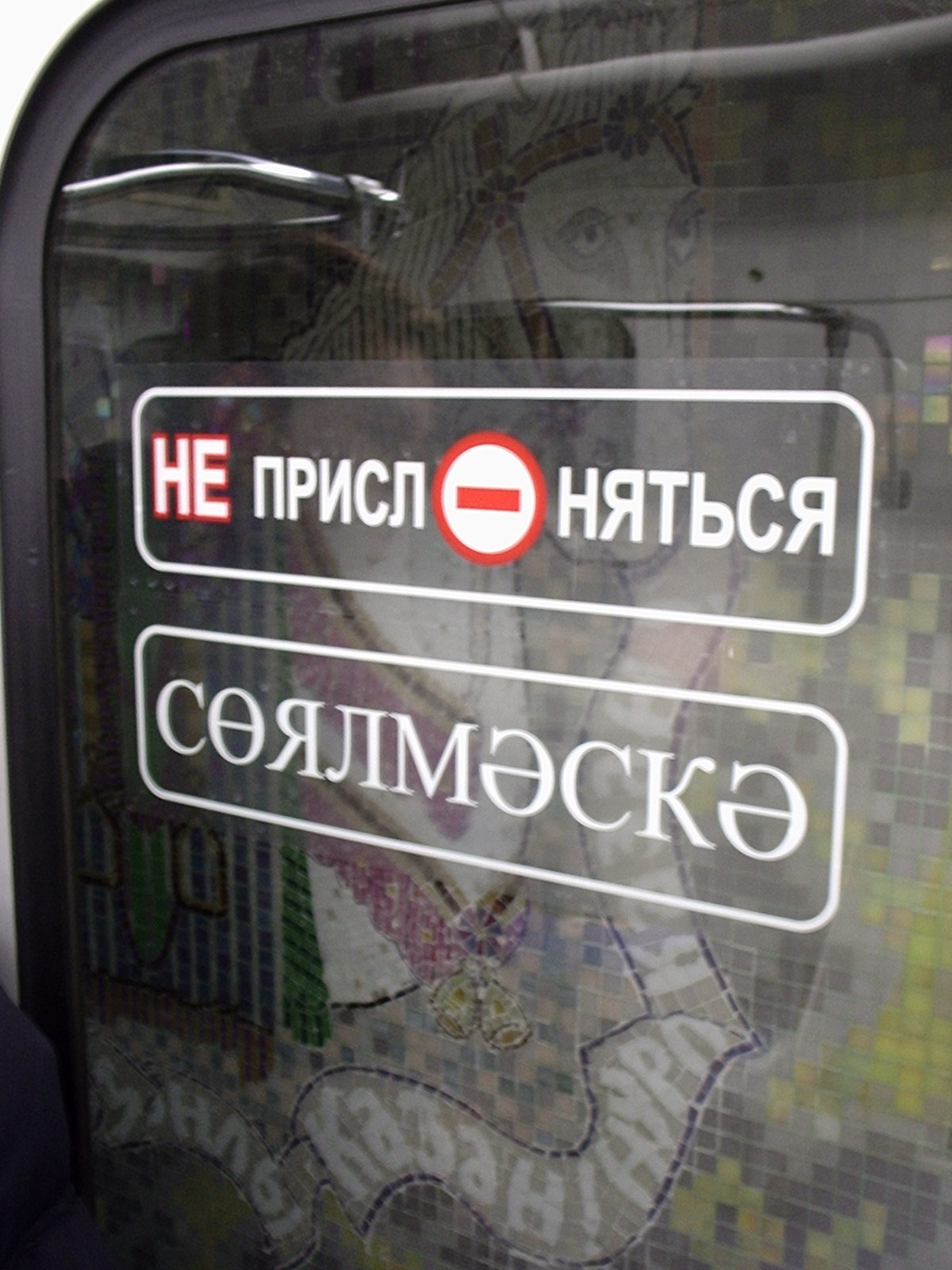
Bilingual guide in Kazan Metro

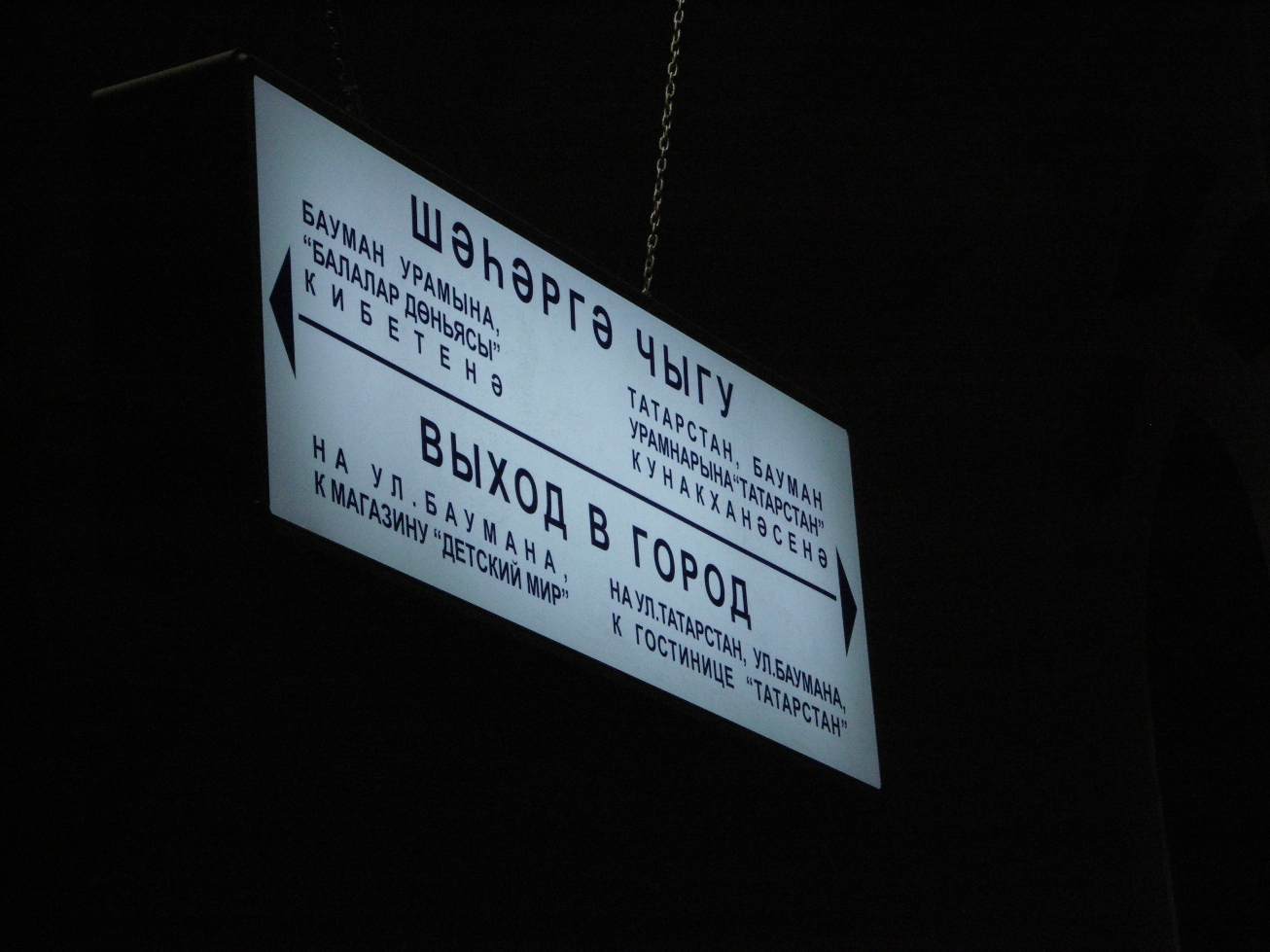
A subway sign in Tatar (top) and Russian

Tatar, along with Russian, is the official language of the Republic of Tatarstan. The official script of the Tatar language is based on the Cyrillic script with some additional letters. The Republic of Tatarstan passed a law in 1999, which came into force in 2001, establishing an official Tatar Latin alphabet. A Russian federal law overrode it in 2002, making Cyrillic the sole official script in Tatarstan since. Unofficially, other scripts are used as well, mostly Latin and Arabic. All official sources in Tatarstan must use Cyrillic on their websites and in publishing. In other cases, where Tatar has no official status, the use of a specific alphabet depends on the preference of the author.

The Tatar language was made a de facto official language in Russia in 1917, but only within the Tatar Autonomous Soviet Socialist Republic. Tatar is also considered to have been the official language in the short-lived Idel-Ural State, briefly formed during the Russian Civil War.

The usage of Tatar declined during the 20th century. By the 1980s, the study and teaching of Tatar in the public education system was limited to rural schools. However, Tatar-speaking pupils had little chance of entering university because higher education was available in Russian almost exclusively.

As of 2001, Tatar was considered a "potentially endangered language" while Siberian Tatar received "endangered" status. Higher education in Tatar can only be found in Tatarstan, and is restricted to the humanities. In other regions Tatar is primarily a spoken language and the number of speakers as well as their proficiency tends to decrease. Tatar is popular as a written language only in Tatar-speaking areas where schools with Tatar language lessons are situated. On the other hand, Tatar is the only language in use in rural districts of Tatarstan.

Since 2017, Tatar language classes are no longer mandatory in the schools of Tatarstan. According to the opponents of this change, it will further endanger the Tatar language and is a violation of the Tatarstan Constitution which stipulates the equality of Russian and Tatar languages in the republic.

== History ==
The ancestors of Tatar are the extinct Turkic Bulgar and Kipchak languages.

The literary Tatar language is based on the Central Tatar (Kazan) dialect and on Volga Türki, also known as Old Tatar Language. Both are members of the Volga-Ural subgroup of the Kipchak group of Turkic languages, although they also partly derive from the ancient Volga Bulgar language. Kazan Tatars used to also write in Chaghatai language.

Crimean Tatar, although similar by name, belongs to another subgroup of the Kipchak languages. Unlike Kazan Tatar, Crimean Tatar is heavily influenced by Turkish (mostly its Ottoman variety with Arabic and Persian influences) and Nogai languages.

=== Influences in Tatar ===
Most of the Uralic languages in the Volga River area have strongly influenced the Tatar language, as have the Arabic, Persian and Russian languages.

==== Arabic and Persian ====
The Tatars joined the Islamic world in the 10th century, enabling Arabic and Persian influence on the language.

Loanwords have largely been filtered through Persian. The stock can be split into an everyday register and a literary register. The everyday register survived the Soviet era, while the literary register was replaced with Russian loans.

Pre-modern literary works used loanwords heavily, similar to Ottoman Turkish. In the early 1900s, reformist intellectuals led a movement to temper the usage of Arabic and Persian loanwords.

Tatar has merged many sounds of Arabic. Some sets of otherwise-homophonous consonants are distinguished by how they condition the backness or frontness of vowels. In Tatar, ع (ayn) and غ (ghayn) are both borrowed as ghayn, which is spelled with ğ (г).

In the Mishar Tatar dialect, ghayn is not pronounced, and is rendered as voiced velar plosive g or omitted altogether (شعر, шигырь, şiğer, "poem"; in Mishar dialect şigır or şiyır).

Long-A (alif) is realised as a, and short-A (fathah) is ä (عيسى, Ğäysä; آزاد, Azat). Alif with hamza (أ) is also ä, but Tatar İske imlâ spelling omits the hamza (امين / أمين, Ämin). Vowel harmony can also affect realisation (عبد الله, Ğabdulla; عبد الرشيد, Ğäbderräşit). This is also the case with ö/o (عمر, Ğömär; عثمان, Ğosman). However, this rule is often inconsistent when transliterating from Cyrillic to Latin. The spelling of borrowings is systematic; for example, سلام "hello" is written as сәлам (sälam), with a long-A, but pronounced as "сәләм” ("säläm").

During the Golden Horde (1242–1502), the ancestors of modern Tatars used Persian in addition to their Turkic language to a relatively significant extent, especially in poetry and even after the Golden Horde. For example, the long-serving Khan of the Kazan Khanate (1438–1552), Möxəmməd-Əmin, wrote poetry in Persian. In religious and legal matters Arabic was used. Many Persian and Arabic works are considered part of Tatar literature today.

==== Russian ====
From incorporation into the Russian Empire to present-day status as a part of the Russian Republic, the Russian language has also exerted influence on Tatar.

This accelerated dramatically during the Soviet era for political reasons, with Russian loanwords supplanting Arabic and Persian loanwords, such that up to half of a dictionary's words were Russian loans.

Since the fall of the Soviet Union, learned speakers have endeavored to de-Russify by restoring Perso-Arabic loanwords, similar (yet directly converse) to Turkish post-Ottoman replacement of Perso-Arabic loanwords. These are not necessarily readily understood among the rest of the populace.

Diaspora language such as Finnish Tatar has been less affected by Soviet developments.

== Dialects ==
There are two main dialects of Tatar:

- Central or Middle (Urta / Qazan)
- Western (Könbatış / Mişär)

These dialects also have subdivisions. Significant contributions to the study of the Tatar language and its dialects, were made by a scientist Gabdulkhay Akhatov, who is considered to be the founder of the modern Tatar dialectological school.

Spoken idioms of Siberian Tatars, which differ significantly from the above two, are often considered as the third dialect group of Tatar by some, but as an independent language on its own by others.

=== Central or Middle ===
The Central or Middle dialectal group is spoken in Kazan and most of Tatarstan and is the basis of the standard literary Tatar language. Middle Tatar includes the Nagaibak dialect.

=== Mishar ===
The Western (Mishar) dialect is distinguished from the Central dialect most clearly by the absence of the uvular q and ğ and the rounded å of the first syllable. Letters ç and c are pronounced as affricates. Regional differences exist also.

Mishar Dialect, and especially its regional variant in Sergachsky district (Nizhny Novgorod), is said to be "faithfully close" to the ancient Kipchak language. Some linguists, such as Radlov, Samoylovich, think that Mishar traditionally belongs to the Kipchak-Cuman group of languages, rather than to the Kipchak-Bulgar group.

Mishar is the dialect spoken by the Tatar minority of Finland.

=== Siberian Tatar ===
Two main isoglosses that characterize Siberian Tatar are ç as [ts] and c as [j], corresponding to standard [ɕ] and [ʑ]. There are also grammatical differences within the dialect, scattered across Siberia.

Many linguists claim the origins of Siberian Tatar dialects are actually independent of Volga–Ural Tatar; these dialects are quite remote both from Standard Tatar and from each other, often preventing mutual comprehension. The claim that this language is part of the modern Tatar language is typically supported by linguists in Kazan, Moscow and by Siberian Tatar linguists and denounced by some Russian and Tatar ethnographs.

Over time, some of these dialects were given distinct names and recognized as separate languages (e.g. the Chulym language) after detailed linguistic study. However, the Chulym language was never classified as a dialect of Tatar language. Confusion arose because of the endoethnonym "Tatars" used by the Chulyms. The question of classifying the Chulym language as a dialect of the Khakass language was debatable. A brief linguistic analysis shows that many of these dialects exhibit features which are quite different from the Volga–Ural Tatar varieties, and should be classified as Turkic varieties belonging to several sub-groups of the Turkic languages, distinct from Kipchak languages to which Volga–Ural Tatar belongs.

== Phonology ==
=== Vowels ===
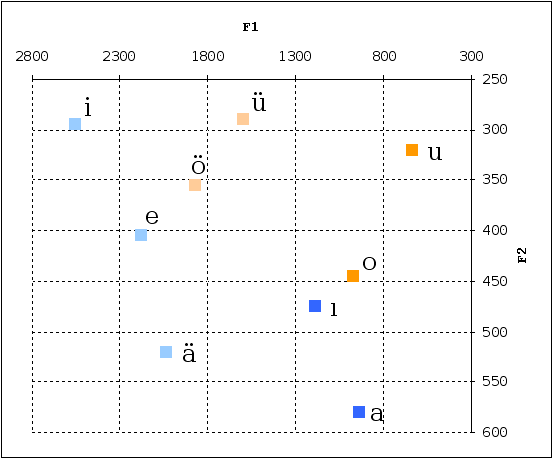
Tatar vowel formants F1 and F2 (in the picture, "F1" and "F2" labels are mistakenly transposed)

There exist several interpretations of the Tatar vowel phonemic inventory. In total Tatar has nine or ten native vowels, and three or four loaned vowels (mainly in Russian loanwords).

According to Baskakov (1988) Tatar has only two vowel heights, high and low. There are two low vowels, front and back, while there are eight high vowels: front and back, round (R+) and unround (R−), normal and short (or reduced).

		Front		Back	
		R−	R+	R−	R+
High	Normal	i	ü	ï	u
High	Short	e	ö	ë	o
Low		ä		a	

Poppe (1963) proposed a similar yet slightly different scheme with a third, higher mid, height, and with nine vowels.

	Front		Back	
	R−	R+	R−	R+
High	i	ü		u
Higher Mid	e	ö	ï	o
Low	ä		a	

According to Makhmutova (1969) Tatar has three vowel heights: high, mid and low, and four tongue positions: front, front-central, back-central and back (as they are named when cited).

	Front		Central				Back	
	Front		Front		Back		Back	
	R−	R+	R−	R+	R−	R+	R−	R+
High	i	ü					ï	u
Mid			e	ö	ë	o		
Low	ä						a	

The mid back unrounded vowel ''ë is usually transcribed as ı, though it differs from the corresponding Turkish vowel.

The tenth vowel ï is realized as the diphthong ëy (IPA: [ɯɪ]), which only occurs word-finally, but it has been argued to be an independent phoneme.

Phonetically, the native vowels are approximately thus (with the Cyrillic letters and the usual Latin romanization in angle brackets):

	Front		Back	
	R−	R+	R−	R+
High	и ⟨i⟩ [i]	ү ⟨ü⟩ [y~ʉ]	ый ⟨ıy⟩ [ɯɪ]	у ⟨u⟩ [u]
Mid	э, е ⟨e⟩ [ĕ~ɘ̆]	ө ⟨ö⟩ [ø̆~ɵ̆]	ы ⟨ı⟩ [ɤ̆~ʌ̆]	о ⟨o⟩ [ŏ]
Low	ә ⟨ä⟩ [æ~a]		а ⟨a⟩ [ɑ]	

In polysyllabic words, the front-back distinction is lost in reduced vowels: all become mid-central. The mid reduced vowels in an unstressed position are frequently elided, as in кеше keşe [kĕˈʃĕ] > [kʃĕ] 'person', or кышы qışı [qɤ̆ˈʃɤ̆] > [qʃɤ̆] '(his) winter'. Low back /ɑ/ is rounded [ɒ] in the first syllable and after [ɒ], but not in the last, as in бала bala [bɒˈlɑ] 'child', балаларга balalarğa [bɒlɒlɒrˈʁɑ] 'to children'. In Russian loans there are also [ɨ], [ɛ], [ɔ], and [ä], written the same as the native vowels: ы, е/э, о, а respectively.

==== Historical shifts ====
Historically, the Old Turkic mid vowels have raised from mid to high, whereas the Old Turkic high vowels have become the Tatar reduced mid series. (The same shifts have also happened in Bashkir.)

Vowel	Old Turkic	Kazakh	Tatar	Bashkir	Gloss
*e	*et	et	it	it	'meat'
*ö	*söz	söz	süz	hüź [hyθ]	'word'
*o	*sol	sol	sul	hul	'left'
*i	*it	it	et	et	'dog'
*ï	*qïz	qız	qız [qɤ̆z]	qıź [qɤ̆θ]	'girl'
*u	*qum	qum	qom	qom	'sand'
*ü	*kül	kül	köl	köl	'ash'

=== Consonants ===
The consonants of Tatar
		Labial	Dental	Post- alveolar	Palatal	Velar	Uvular	Glottal
Nasals		м ⟨m⟩ /m/	н ⟨n⟩ /n/			ң ⟨ñ⟩ /ŋ/		
Plosives	Voiceless	п ⟨p⟩ /p/	т ⟨t⟩ /t/			к ⟨k⟩ /k/	къ ⟨q⟩ /q/^{‡}	э/ь ⟨ʼ⟩ /ʔ/^{*}
Plosives	Voiced	б ⟨b⟩ /b/	д ⟨d⟩ /d/			г ⟨g⟩ /ɡ/		
Affricates	Voiceless		ц ⟨ts⟩ /ts/^{*}^{†}		ч ⟨ç⟩ /tɕ/^{*}^{†}			
Affricates	Voiced				җ ⟨c⟩ /dʑ/^{†}			
Fricatives	Voiceless	ф ⟨f⟩ /f/^{*}	с ⟨s⟩ /s/	ш ⟨ş⟩ /ʃ/	ч ⟨ś⟩ /ɕ/		х ⟨x⟩ /χ/	һ ⟨h⟩ /h/^{*}
Fricatives	Voiced	в ⟨v⟩ /v/^{*}	з ⟨z⟩ /z/	ж ⟨j⟩ /ʒ/^{*}	җ ⟨ź⟩ /ʑ/		гъ ⟨ğ⟩ /ʁ/^{‡}	
Trill			р ⟨r⟩ /r/					
Approximants			л ⟨l⟩ /l/		й ⟨y⟩ /j/	у/ү/в ⟨w⟩ /w/		

Notes
^* The phonemes /v/, /ts/, /tɕ/, /ʒ/, /h/, /ʔ/ are only found in loanwords. /f/ occurs more commonly in loanwords, but is also found in native words, e.g. yafraq 'leaf'. /v/, /ts/, /tɕ/, /ʒ/ may be substituted with the corresponding native consonants /w/, /s/, /ɕ/, /ʑ/ by some Tatars.
^† /dʑ/ and /tɕ/ are the dialectal Western (Mişär) pronunciations of җ ⟨c⟩ /ʑ/ and ч ⟨ç⟩ /ɕ/, the latter are in the literary standard and in the Central (Kazan) dialect. /ts/ is the variant of ч ⟨ç⟩ /ɕ/ as pronounced in the Eastern (Siberian) dialects and some Western (Mişär) dialects. Both /tɕ/ and /ts/ are also used in Russian loanwords (the latter written ц).
^‡ In native words, /q/ and /ʁ/ are allophones of /k/ and /ɡ/ in the environment of back vowels, and written in Cyrillic with plain к and г. This is not the case in Perso-Arabic loanwords, where the difference is phonemic.

==== Palatalization ====
Tatar consonants usually undergo slight palatalization before front vowels. However, this allophony is not significant and does not constitute a phonemic status. This differs from Russian where palatalized consonants are not allophones but phonemes on their own. There are a number of Russian loanwords which have palatalized consonants in Russian and are thus written the same in Tatar (often with the "soft sign" ь). The Tatar standard pronunciation also requires palatalization in such loanwords; however, some Tatar may pronounce them non-palatalized.

=== Syllables ===
In native words there are six types of syllables (Consonant, Vowel, Sonorant):

- V (ı-lıs, u-ra, ö-rä)
- VC (at-law, el-geç, ir-kä)
- CV (qa-la, ki-yä, su-la)
- CVC (bar-sa, sız-law, köç-le, qoş-çıq)
- VSC (ant-lar, äyt-te, ilt-kän)
- CVSC (tört-te, qart-lar, qayt-qan)

Loanwords allow other types: CSV (gra-mota), CSVC (käs-trül), etc.

=== Prosody ===
Stress is usually on the final syllable. However, some suffixes cannot be stressed, so the stress shifts to the syllable before that suffix, even if the stressed syllable is the third or fourth from the end. A number of Tatar words and grammatical forms have the natural stress on the first syllable. Loanwords, mainly from Russian, usually preserve their original stress (unless the original stress is on the last syllable, in such a case the stress in Tatar shifts to suffixes as usual, e.g. sovét > sovetlár > sovetlarğá).

=== Phonetic alterations ===
Tatar phonotactics dictate many pronunciation changes which are not reflected in the orthography.

- Unrounded vowels ı and e become rounded after o or ö:

коры/qorı > [qoro]
борын/borın > [boron]
көзге/közge > [közgö]
соры/sorı > [soro]

- Nasals are assimilated to the following stops:

унбер/unber > [umber]
менгеч/mengeç > [meñgeç]

- Stops are assimilated to the preceding nasals (this is reflected in writing):

урманнар/urmannar ( < urman + lar)
комнар/qomnar ( < qom + lar)

- Voicing may also undergo assimilation:

күзсез/küzsez > [küssez]

- Unstressed vowels may be syncopated or reduced:

урыны/urını> [urnı]
килене/kilene > [kilne]

- Vowels may also be elided:

кара урман/qara urman > [qarurman]
килә иде/kilä ide > [kiläyde]
туры урам/turı uram > [tururam]
була алмыйм/bula almıym > [bulalmıym]

- In consonant clusters longer than two phones, ı or e (whichever is dictated by vowel harmony) is inserted into speech as an epenthetic vowel.

банк/bank > /bɑŋˈqɤ/

- Final consonant clusters are simplified:

артист/artist > /ɑrˈtis/

- Final devoicing is also frequent:

табиб/tabib > /tɑˈbip/

== Grammar ==
Like other Turkic languages, Tatar is an agglutinative language.

=== Nouns ===
Tatar nouns are inflected for cases and numbers. Case suffixes change depending on the last consonants of the noun, while nouns ending in for example p/k (п/к) are voiced to b/g (б/г) when a possessive suffix is added (kitap –> kitabım / китабым, "my book"). Suffixes below are in back vowel, with front variant can be seen at #Phonology section.

Case	After voiced consonants	After nasals	After unvoiced consonants	Special endings
Nominative (баш килеш)	–			
Accusative (төшем килеше)	-ны -nı			-н -n
Genitive (иялек килеше)	-ның -nıñ			
Dative (юнәлеш килеше)	-га -ğa		-ка -qa	-а, -на -a, -na
Locative (урын-вакыт килеше)	-да -da		-та -ta	-нда -nda
Ablative (чыгыш килеше)	-дан -dan	-нан -nan	-тан -tan	-ннан -nnan
Plural
Nominative	-лар -lar	-нар -nar	-лар -lar	
Accusative	-ларны -larnı	-нарны -narnı	-ларны -larnı	
Genitive	-ларның -larnıñ	-нарның -narnıñ	-ларның -larnıñ	
Dative	-ларга -larğa	-нарга -narğa	-ларга -larğa	
Locative	-ларда -larda	-нарда -narda	-ларда -larda	
Ablative	-лардан -lardan	-нардан -nardan	-лардан -lardan	

The declension of possessive suffixes is even more irregular, with the dative suffix -а used in 1st singular and 2nd singular suffixes, and the accusative, dative, locative, and ablative endings -н, -на, -нда, -ннан is used after 3rd person possessive suffix. Nouns ending in -и, -у, or -ү, although phonologically vowels, take consonantic endings.

Person	After consonants	After vowels
1st singular	-ым -ım	-м -m
2nd singular	-ың -ıñ	-ң -ñ
3rd	-ы -ı	-сы -sı
1st plural	-ыбыз -ıbız	-быз -bız
2nd plural	-ыгыз -ığız	-гыз -ğız

=== Declension of pronouns ===
The declension of personal and demonstrative pronouns tends to be irregular. Irregular forms are in bold.

Personal pronouns
Case	Singular			Plural		
Case	I	you (sg.), thou	he, she, it	we	you (pl.)	they
Nominative	мин min	син sin	ул ul	без bez	сез sez	алар alar
Accusative	**мине** mine	**сине** sine	**аны** anı	безне bezne	сезне sezne	аларны alarnı
Genitive	**минем** minem	**синең** sineñ	**аның** anıñ	безнең bezneñ	сезнең sezneñ	аларның alarnıñ
Dative	**миңа** miña	**сиңа** siña	**аңа** aña	безгә bezgä	сезгә sezgä	аларга alarğa
Locative	миндә mindä	синдә sindä	**анда** anda	бездә bezdä	сездә sezdä	аларда alarda
Ablative	миннән minnän	синнән sinnän	**аннан** annan	бездән bezdän	сездән sezdän	алардан alardan

Demonstrative pronouns
Case	Singular		Plural	
Case	"This"	"That"	"These"	"Those"
Nominative	бу bu	шул şul	болар bolar	шулар şular
Accusative	**моны** monı	**шуны** şunı	боларны bolarnı	шуларны şularnı
Genitive	**моның** monıñ	**шуның** şunıñ	боларның bolarnıñ	шуларның şularnıñ
Dative	**моңа** moña	**шуңа** şuña	боларга bolarğa	шуларга şularğa
Locative	**монда** monda	**шунда** şunda	боларда bolarda	шуларда şularda
Ablative	**моннан** monnan	**шуннан** şunnan	болардан bolardan	шулардан şulardan

Interrogative pronouns
Case	Who?	What?
Nominative	кем kem	нәрсә närsä
Accusative	кемне kemne	нәрсәне närsäne
Genitive	кемнең kemneñ	нәрсәнең närsäneñ
Dative	кемгә kemgä	нәрсәгә närsägä
Locative	кемдә kemdä	нәрсәдә närsädä
Ablative	кемнән kemnän	нәрсәдән närsädän

=== Verbs ===
Like some other Turkic languages, Tatar employs no proper articles to convey definiteness; instead, this semantic property is marked by different morphemes. Broadly speaking, definiteness corresponds to the English 'the', while indefiniteness corresponds to 'a' or 'an'. The verb conjunction is affected by the definiteness of its arguments (subject or object).

Tense	After voiced consonants	After unvoiced consonants	After vowels
Present	-а -a		-ый -ıy
Definite past	-ды -dı	-ты -tı	-ды -dı
Indefinite past	-ган -ğan	-кан -qan	-ган -ğan
Definite future	-ачак -açaq		-ячак -yaçaq
Indefinite future	-ар/ыр -ar/-ır		-р -r
Conditional	-са -sa		
Non-finite tenses
Present participle	-учы -uçı		
Past participle	-ган -ğan	-кан -qan	-ган -ğan
Future participle	-асы -ası		-ыйсы -ıysı
Definite future participle	-ачак -açaq		
Indefinite future participle	-ар/-ыр -ar/ır		-р -r
Verbal participle	-ып -ıp		-п -p
Pre-action gerund	-ганчы -ğançı	-канчы -qançı	-ганчы -ğançı
Post-action gerund	-гач -ğaç	-кач -qaç	-гач -ğaç
Verbal noun	-у		
Infinitive	-мак -maq		
Infinitive	-арга/-ырга -arğa/ırğa		-рга -rğa

The distribution of present tense suffixes is complicated, with the former (also with vowel harmony) is used with verb stems ending in consonants, and the latter is used with verb stem ending in vowels (with the last vowel being deleted, eşläw / эшләү – eşli / эшли; compare Turkish işlemek – continuous işliyor). The distribution of indefinite future tense is more complicated in consonant-ending stems, it is resolved by -арга/-ырга infinitives (yazarga / язарга – yazar / язар). However, because some have verb citation forms in verbal noun (-у), this rule becomes somewhat unpredictable.

Tenses are negated with -ма, however in the indefinite future tense and the verbal participle they become -mas / -мас and -mıyça / -мыйча instead, respectively. Alongside vowel-ending stems, the suffix also becomes -мый when negates the present tense. To form interrogatives, the suffix -мы is used.

Personal inflections
Type	1st singular	2nd singular	3rd singular	1st plural	2nd plural	3rd plural
I	-мын/-м -mın/-m	-сың -sıñ	-∅	-быз -bız	-сыз -sız	-лар/-нар -lar/-nar
II	-м -m	-ң -ñ	-∅	-к -q, -k	-гыз -ğız	-лар/-нар -lar/-nar
Imperative	-ыйм -ıym	-∅	-сын -sın	-ыйк -ıyq	-(ы)гыз -ığız	-сыннар -sınnar

Definite past and conditional tenses use type II personal inflections instead. When in the case of present tense, short ending (-м) is used. After vowels, the first person imperative forms deletes the last vowel, similar to the present tense does (eşläw – eşlim). Like plurals of nouns, the suffix -лар change depending the preceding consonants (-alar, but -ğannar).

==== Anomalous verbs ====
Some verbs fall into this category. Dozens of them have irregular stems with a final mid vowel, but obscured on the infinitive (uqu – uqı, uqıy; tözü – töze, tözi). The verbs qoru / кору "to build", tanu / тану "to disclaim", taşu / ташу "to spill" have contrastive meanings with verbs with their final vowelled counterparts, meaning "to dry", "to know", "to carry".

The verb дию (diyu) "to say" is significantly more irregular than any other verbs: its 2nd person singular imperative is digen (диген), while its expected regular form is repurposed as the present tense forms (dim, diñ, di…).

=== Predicatives ===
	After voiced consonants	After unvoiced consonants
1st singular	-мын -mın	
2nd singular	-сың -sıñ	
3rd	-дыр -dır	-тыр -tır
1st plural	-быз -bız	
2nd plural	-сыз -sız	

These predicative suffixes have now fallen into disuse, or rarely used.

== Writing system ==
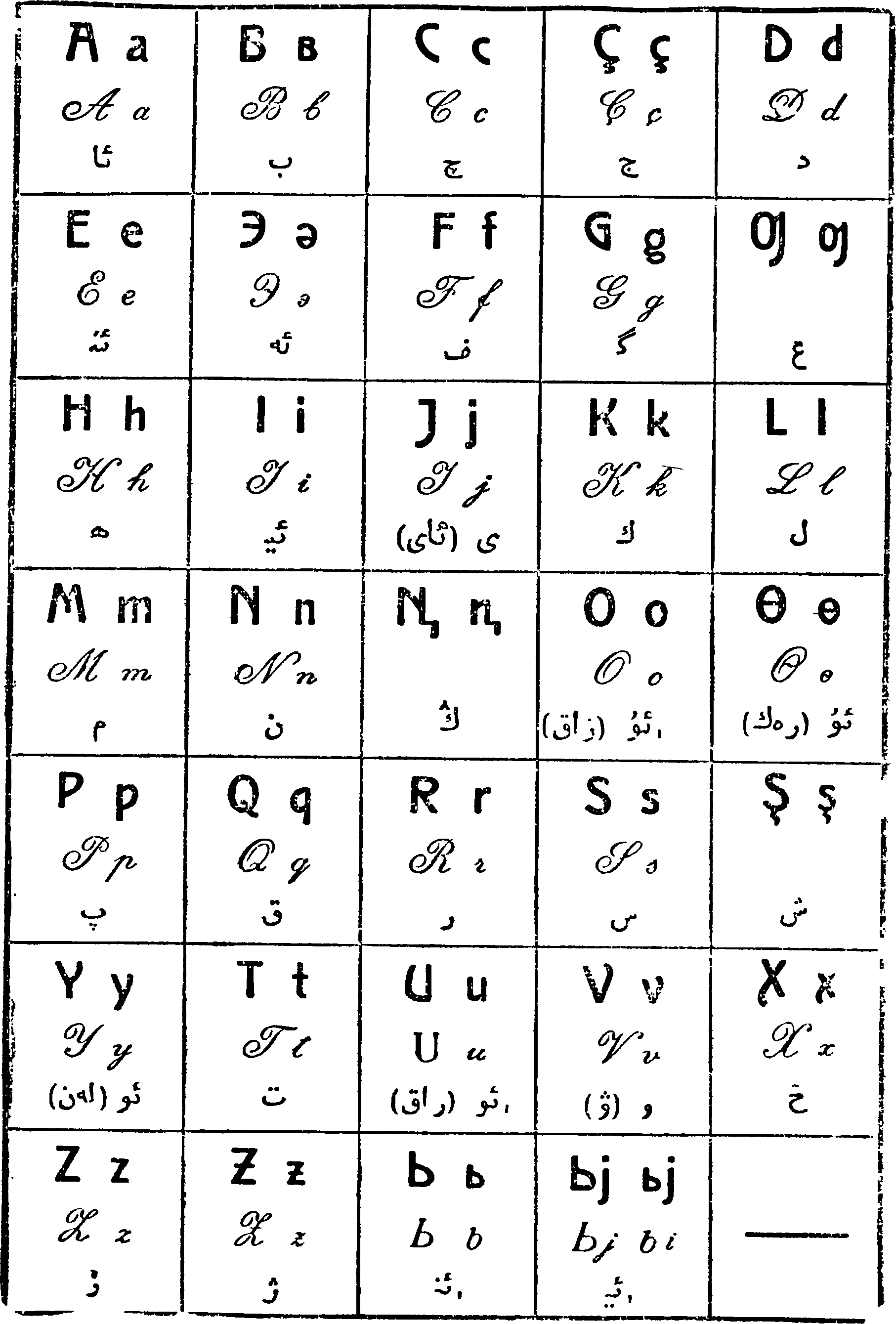
Tatar Latin (Jaꞑalif) and Arabic scripts, 1927

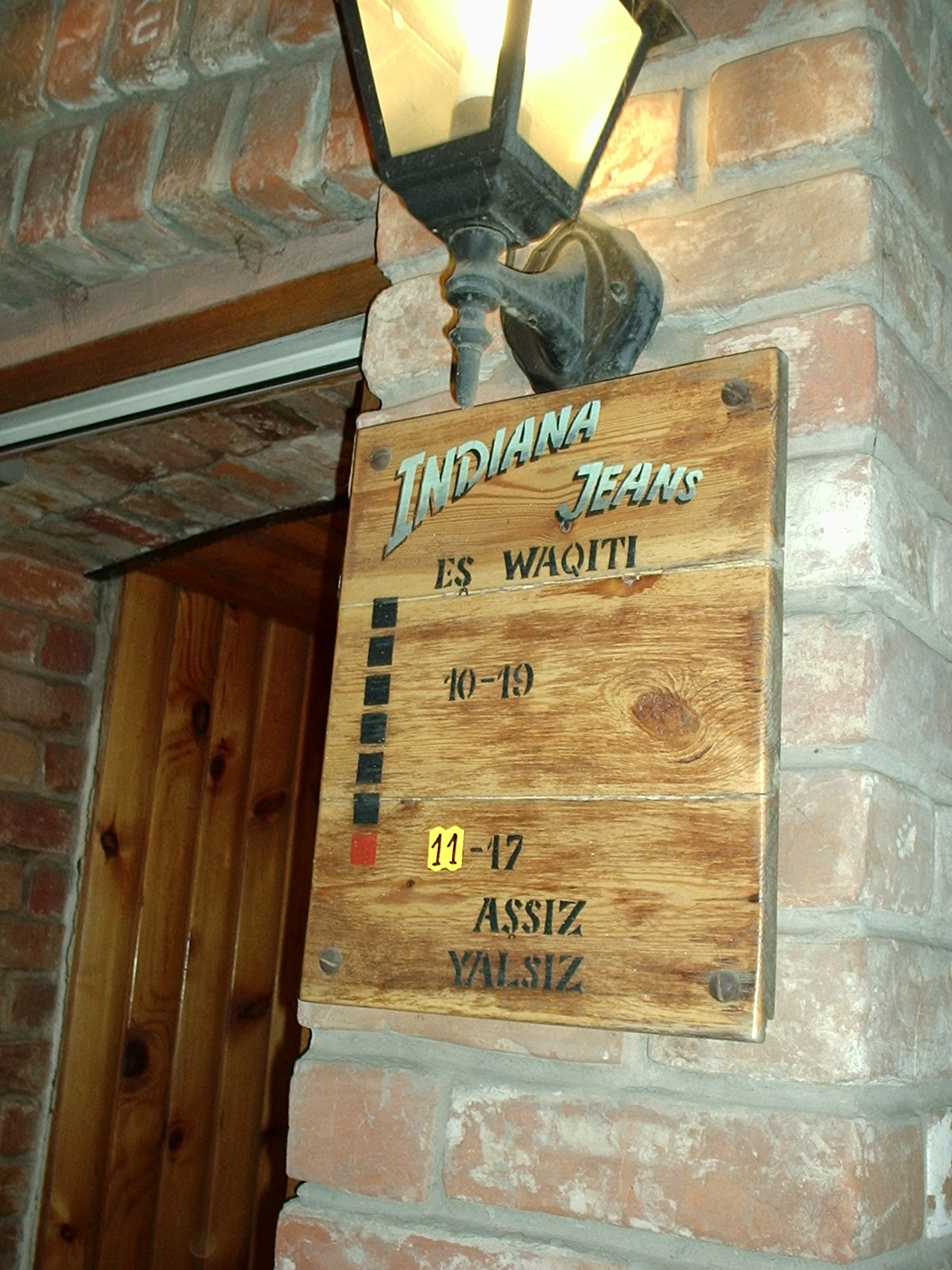
Some guides in Kazan are in Latin script, especially in fashion boutiques.

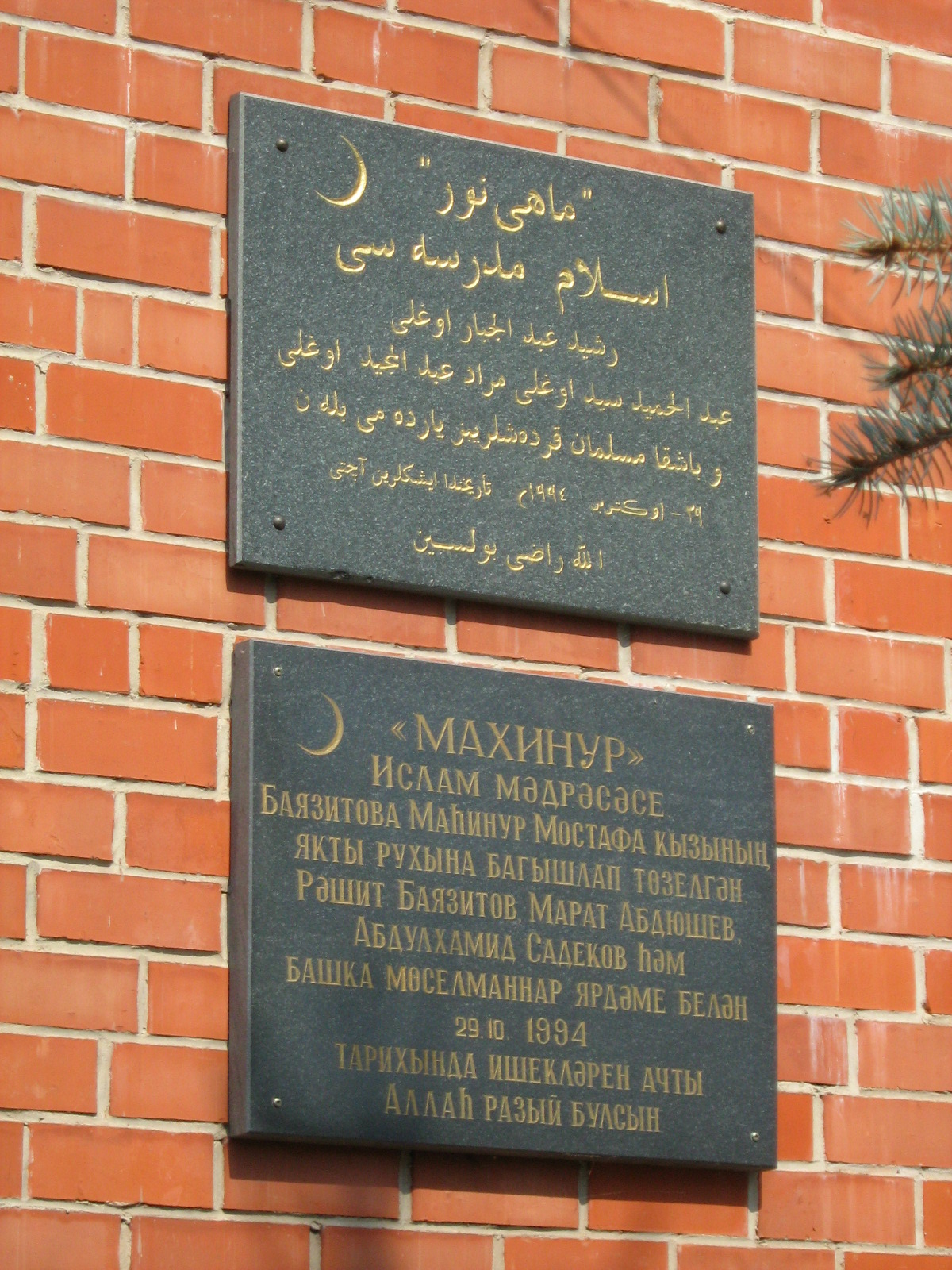
Tatar sign on a madrasah in Nizhny Novgorod, written in both Arabic and Cyrillic Tatar scripts

During its history, Tatar has been written in Arabic, Latin and Cyrillic scripts.

Before 1928, Tatar was mostly written in Arabic script (Иске имля/İske imlâ, "Old orthography", to 1920; Яңа имла/Yaña imlâ, "New orthography", 1920–1928).

During the 19th century, Russian Christian missionary Nikolay Ilminsky devised the first Cyrillic alphabet for Tatar. This alphabet is still used by Christian Tatars (Kryashens).

In the Soviet Union after 1928, Tatar was written with a Latin alphabet called Jaꞑalif.

In 1939, in Tatarstan and all other parts of the Soviet Union, a Cyrillic script was adopted and is still used to write Tatar. It is also used in Kazakhstan.

The Republic of Tatarstan passed a law in 1999 that came into force in 2001 establishing an official Tatar Latin alphabet. A Russian federal law overrode it in 2002, making Cyrillic the sole official script in Tatarstan since. In 2004, an attempt to introduce a Latin-based alphabet for Tatar was further abandoned when the Constitutional Court ruled that the federal law of 15 November 2002 mandating the use of Cyrillic for the state languages of the republics of the Russian Federation does not contradict the Russian constitution. In accordance with this Constitutional Court ruling, on 28 December 2004, the Tatar Supreme Court overturned the Tatarstani law that made the Latin alphabet official.

In 2012 the Tatarstan government adopted a new Latin alphabet but with limited usage (mostly for Romanization).

In 2024, the modified Common Turkic Alphabet replaced letter ä with ə, which was already in use in Azerbaijani, as well as among Tatar activists using the Latin alphabet.

- Tatar Perso-Arabic alphabet (before 1928):

ح	چ	ج	ث	ت	پ	ب	ا
ش	س	ژ	ز	ر	ذ	د	خ
ق	ف	غ	ع	ظ	ط	ض	ص
ۋ	و	ن	م	ل	ڭ	گ	ك
						ی	ه

- Tatar Old Latin (Jaꞑalif) alphabet (1928 to 1940):

A a	B ʙ	C c	Ç ç	D d	E e	Ə ə	F f
G g	Ƣ ƣ	H h	I i	J j	K k	L l	M m
N n	Ꞑ ꞑ	O o	Ɵ ɵ	P p	Q q	R r	S s
Ş ş	T t	U u	V v	X x	У y	Z z	Ƶ ƶ
Ь ь	'

- Tatar Old Cyrillic alphabet (by Nikolay Ilminsky, 1861; the letters in parentheses are not used in modern publications):

А а	Ӓ ӓ	Б б	В в	Г г	Д д	Е е	Ё ё
Ж ж	З з	И и	(Іі)	Й й	К к	Л л	М м
Н н	Ҥ ҥ	О о	Ӧ ӧ	П п	Р р	С с	Т т
У у	Ӱ ӱ	Ф ф	Х х	Ц ц	Ч ч	Ш ш	Щ щ
Ъ ъ	Ы ы	Ь ь	(Ѣѣ)	Э э	Ю ю	Я я	(Ѳѳ)

- Tatar Cyrillic alphabet (1939; the letter order adopted in 1997):

А а	Ә ә	Б б	В в	Г г	Д д	Е е	Ё ё
Ж ж	Җ җ	З з	И и	Й й	К к	Л л	М м
Н н	Ң ң	О о	Ө ө	П п	Р р	С с	Т т
У у	Ү ү	Ф ф	Х х	Һ һ	Ц ц	Ч ч	Ш ш
Щ щ	Ъ ъ	Ы ы	Ь ь	Э э	Ю ю	Я я

- 1999 Tatar Latin alphabet, made official by a law adopted by Tatarstani authorities but annulled by the Tatar Supreme Court in 2004:

A a	Ə ə	B b	C c	Ç ç	D d	E e	F f
G g	Ğ ğ	H h	I ı	İ i	J j	K k	Q q
L l	M m	N n	Ꞑ ꞑ	O o	Ɵ ɵ	P p	R r
S s	Ş ş	T t	U u	Ü ü	V v	W w	X x
Y y	Z z	ʼ

- 2012 Tatar Latin alphabet

A a	Ä ä	B b	C c	Ç ç	D d	E e	F f
G g	Ğ ğ	H h	I ı	İ i	J j	K k	Ll
M m	N n	Ñ ñ	O o	Ö ö	P p	Q q	R r
S s	Ş ş	T t	U u	Ü ü	V v	W w	X x
Y y	Z z	'

== Sample text ==
Tatar pronunciation by Kazan Tatar Bulat Şəymi (2025).

Article 1 of the Universal Declaration of Human Rights in Tatar (Cyrillic):

Барлык кешеләр дә азат һәм үз абруйлары һәм хокуклары ягыннан тиң булып туалар. Аларга акыл һәм вөҗдан бирелгән, һәм алар бер-берсенә карата туганнарча мөнасәбәттә булырга тиешләр.

Article 1 of the Universal Declaration of Human Rights in Tatar (Latin):

Barlıq keşelər də azat həm üz abruyları həm xoquqları yağınnan tiñ bulıp tuwalar. Alarğa aqıl həm wöcdan birelgən, həm alar ber-bersenə qarata tuğannarça mönəsəbəttə bulırğa tiyeşlər.

International Phonetic Alphabet transcription:

[bɒrˈɫɤq kɘ̆ʃɘ̆ˈlær dæ ɒˈzɑt hæm ʉz ɒβˌrujɫɑˈrɤ hæm χoˌquqɫɑˈrɤ ˌʝɒʁɤnˈnɑn ˈtiŋ buˈɫɤp tuˈwɑˌɫɑr ‖ ˌɒɫɒrˈʁɑ ɒˈqɤɫ hæm wɵʑˈdɑn ˌbirɘlˈɡæn hæm ɒˈɫɑr ˌbɘr‿ˌbɘrsɘˈnæ ˌqɒrɒˈtɑ tuˌʁɑnˈnɑrɕɑ mɵˌnɑsæβætˈtæ ˌbuɫɤrˈɢɑ tiˈjɘʃˌlær ‖]

Article 1 of the Universal Declaration of Human Rights in English:

All human beings are born free and equal in dignity and rights. They are endowed with reason and conscience and should act towards one another in a spirit of brotherhood.

== See also ==
- Corpus of Written Tatar
- Tatar alphabets
- Tatar name
- Tatar–Russian code-switching
- Bashkir language
- Law on languages of peoples of the Russian Federation — introduced as a reaction to Tatarstan's attempt to switch the Tatar language from the Cyrillic alphabet to the Latin alphabet
