= Khostug Tyva =

Former political party in Tuva, Russia

Khostug Tyva Хостуг Тыва
- Leader: Kaadyr-ool Bicheldey
- Founded: October 1989
- Dissolved: Late 1990s
- Ideology: Tuvan nationalism; Anti-communism; Anti-Russian sentiment; Pan-Turkism
- National affiliation: Party of Russian Unity and Accord

Khostug Tyva (Tuvan: Хостуг Тыва, romanized: Xostug Tıva, lit. 'free Tuva') was a political party in Tuva which existed from 1989 until the late 1990s. Originally established as the People's Front of Tuva (Russian: Народный фронт Тувы, romanized: Narodnyy front Tuvy), Khostug Tyva led the anti-Russian riots that resulted in the flight of most of the republic's ethnic Russian population, as well as later efforts to achieve independence from Russia.

== History ==
The People's Front of Tuva was founded under the leadership of Kaadyr-ool Bicheldey in October 1989, amidst the dissolution of the Soviet Union and increasing enmity between ethnic Tuvans and Russians in the Tuvan Autonomous Soviet Socialist Republic. Khostug Tuva's leadership actively supported the anti-Russian riots in Tuva, calling for all Russians to leave the republic. Bicheldey was elected as a member of the Supreme Soviet of the Tuvan Autonomous Soviet Socialist Republic in March 1990.

After its legalisation in on 10 June 1992, Khostug Tuva began advocating for a referendum on the separation of Tuva from Russia. The party supported measures to increase affordable housing for rural Tuvan migrants to the capital, Kyzyl, and successfully pushed the population to oppose the 1993 Russian constitutional referendum, on the basis of opposition to private ownership of land.

Khostug Tyva was also connected to nationalist groups from Khakassia and the Altai Republic, and united with the Khakas Çon çobį party to form the Association of Peoples of Southern Siberia on 17 June 1993. The political alliance argued for inhabitants of Russian republics to receive greater rights, as well as for the unification of Turkic peoples into a single state.

=== Split and dissolution ===
In 1993, Khostug Tyva split in two as a result of conflicts between the moderate and radical wings of the party. The radicals remained within Khostug Tyva, while the moderates formed the People's Party of Sovereign Tuva (Russian: Народная партия суверенной Тувы, romanized: Narodnaya partiya suverrenoy Tuvy). The People's Party of Sovereign Tuva was formally registered on 14 February 1993. Following the split, Khostug Tyva continued to call for Tuvan independence from the Russian Federation, and the chief of the party's executive committee, Igor Badra, was a candidate for the Party of Russian Unity and Accord during the 1993 Russian legislative election.

Khostug Tyva dissolved itself at some point during the late 1990s.
