= Tatar Braille =

Tatar language Braille system

- Script type: alphabet
- Print basis: Tatar alphabet
- Languages: Tatar

Related scripts
- Parent systems: Braille: Russian Braille; Tatar Braille

The braille alphabet used for the Tatar language is based on Russian Braille, with several additional letters found in the print Tatar alphabet.

== Alphabet ==
Tatar uses all of the letters of the Russian alphabet, though some just in loans, and has the additional letters ә, җ, ң, һ, ө, ү.

Print	а a	ә ä	б b	в v/w	г g/ğ	д d	е e	ё yo	ж j	җ c	з z	и i	й y
Braille	⠁ (braille pattern dots-1)	⠜ (braille pattern dots-345)	⠃ (braille pattern dots-12)	⠺ (braille pattern dots-2456)	⠛ (braille pattern dots-1245)	⠙ (braille pattern dots-145)	⠑ (braille pattern dots-15)	⠡ (braille pattern dots-16)	⠚ (braille pattern dots-245)	⠻ (braille pattern dots-12456)	⠵ (braille pattern dots-1356)	⠊ (braille pattern dots-24)	⠯ (braille pattern dots-12346)
Print	к k/q	л l	м m	н n	ң ñ	о o	ө ö	п p	р r	с s	т t	у u	ү ü
Braille	⠅ (braille pattern dots-13)	⠇ (braille pattern dots-123)	⠍ (braille pattern dots-134)	⠝ (braille pattern dots-1345)	⠹ (braille pattern dots-1456)	⠕ (braille pattern dots-135)	⠣ (braille pattern dots-126)	⠏ (braille pattern dots-1234)	⠗ (braille pattern dots-1235)	⠎ (braille pattern dots-234)	⠞ (braille pattern dots-2345)	⠥ (braille pattern dots-136)	⠽ (braille pattern dots-13456)
Print	ф f	х x	һ h	ц c	ч ç	ш ş	щ şş	ъ ”	ы ı	ь ’	э é	ю yu	я ya
Braille	⠋ (braille pattern dots-124)	⠓ (braille pattern dots-125)	⠧ (braille pattern dots-1236)	⠉ (braille pattern dots-14)	⠟ (braille pattern dots-12345)	⠱ (braille pattern dots-156)	⠭ (braille pattern dots-1346)	⠷ (braille pattern dots-12356)	⠮ (braille pattern dots-2346)	⠾ (braille pattern dots-23456)	⠪ (braille pattern dots-246)	⠳ (braille pattern dots-1256)	⠫ (braille pattern dots-1246)

== Punctuation ==
Single punctuation:

Print	,	.	?	!	;	:
Braille	⠂ (braille pattern dots-2)	⠲ (braille pattern dots-256)	⠢ (braille pattern dots-26)	⠖ (braille pattern dots-235)	⠆ (braille pattern dots-23)	⠒ (braille pattern dots-25)

Paired punctuation:

Tatar Braille is reported to use the Russian arithmetical parentheses ⠣ ... ⠜.

Print	« ... »	( ... )
Braille	...	...

== Formatting ==
italics	capital	number
⠸ (braille pattern dots-456)	⠨ (braille pattern dots-46)	⠼ (braille pattern dots-3456)
