= Kaadyr-ool Bicheldey =

Russian politician

- Каадыр-оол Бичелдей
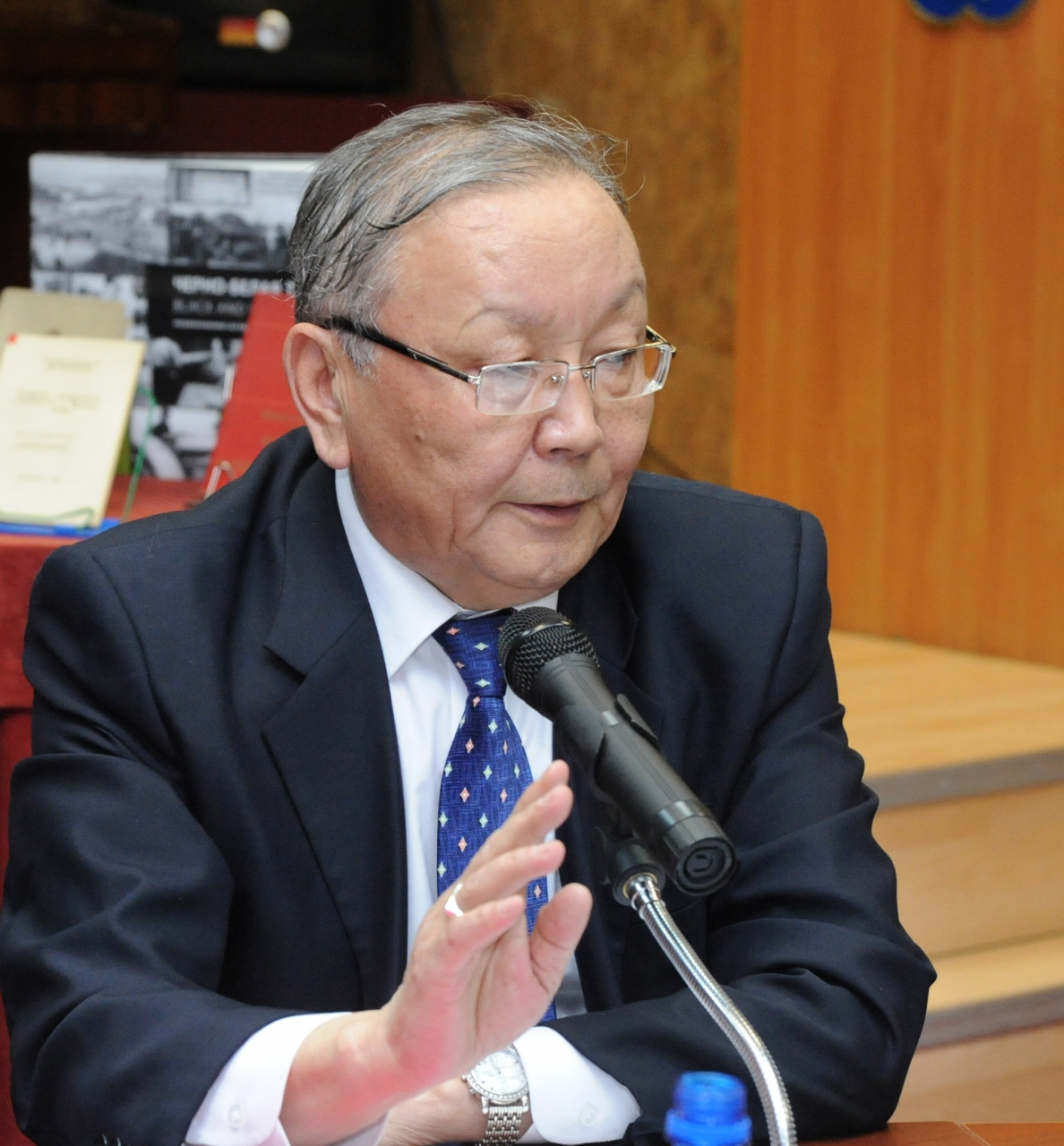
- Bicheldey in 2018

Member of the State Duma
- In office 1999–2003
- Parliamentary group: Unity

Chairman of the Great Khural of Tuva
- In office 6 January 1994 – 24 June 1998
- Succeeded by: Sholban Kara-ool

Chairman of the Supreme Soviet of Tuva
- In office 2 October 1991 – 6 January 1994
- Preceded by: Chimit-Dorzhu Ondar

Personal details
- Born: 2 January 1950 (age 76) Pestunovka, Ulug-Khemsky District, Tuvan AO, RSFSR, Soviet Union
- Party: Khostug Tyva
- Education: National University of Mongolia

Kaadyr-ool Alexeyevich Bicheldey (Note: Russian: Каадыр-оол Алексеевич Бичелдей, Tuvan: Каадыр-оол Алексей оглу Бичелдей, romanized: Kâdır-ôl Aleksey oglu Biçeldey) (born 2 January 1950) is a Russian philologist and politician of Tuvan descent. Nowadays he is the director of the Tuvan National Museum "Aldan-Maadyr".

From 2000 to 2003, Bicheldey was a member of the third-convocation State Duma of the Russia. There, he was notable as a notable proponent of the Law on languages of peoples of the Russian Federation. Afterwards, from 2004 to 2008, he was the Speaker of the Great Khural of Tuva.
