= List of chairpersons of the Great Khural of Tuva =

This is a list of chairmen (Speakers) of the Supreme Council:

Name	Entered office	Left office
Chimit-Dorzhu Ondar	April 27, 1990	1991
Kaadyr-ool Bicheldey	October 2, 1991	January 6, 1994

This is a list of presidents (Speakers) of the Great Khural of Tuva:

Name	Entered office	Left office
Kaadyr-ool Bicheldey	January 6, 1994	June 29, 1998
Sholban Kara-ool	June 30, 1998	June 2002
Bicameral	2002	2010
Kan-Ool Davaa	October 21, 2010	Present
