= Çon çobĕ =

Former political organisation in Khakassia, Russia

Çon çobĕ Чон чобi
- Leader: Arseny Takhtobin
- Founded: March 1992
- Dissolved: 2001
- Ideology: Khakas nationalism; Pan-Turkism
- Regional affiliation: Association of Peoples of Southern Siberia

Çon çobĕ (Khakas: Чон чобi, lit. 'national council') is the executive council of the Congress of the Khakas People, with members elected by the Congress to serve three-year terms. It has operated underground since being formally liquidated by the Russian government in 2001.

== History ==
Çon çobį was founded in March 1992 as the executive council of the Congress of the Khakas People. According to a 1999 paper by the Panorama analytical centre the members of the organisation were selected to serve three-year terms, with a çalo (leader) and two deputies.

On 17 June 1993 formed the Association of Peoples of Southern Siberia, alongside Tuvan nationalist political party Khostug Tyva. The stated goals of the alliance were to advance the civil rights of the indigenous peoples of the region, and to establish a federation or confederation of Turkic peoples. The organisation was involved in a bitter public feud with Aleksey Lebed following his 2000 election as Head of the Republic of Khakassia, claiming that Khakas individuals had been restricted from voting, allowing Lebed to defeat the ethnically-Khakas Vasily Astanayev. Lebed responded to Çon çobį's efforts against him by mocking their lack of formal registration.

Over time, Çon çobį's membership steadily increased, eventually peaking at 51 in the late 1990s. This led to it becoming increasingly prone to infighting, and a rift between younger members, who were required to observe the organisation's guidelines, and the elder members, who were not. Following the 8th Congress of the Khakas People, this rift exploded into public fighting. Further worsening the split, the organisation was liquidated in summer 2001 by a court order with the support of the organisation's head, G. I. Mainogashev. Mikhail Chertykov, a member of Çon çobį from the period, has since claimed that Mainogashev was a Russian government agent with the intention of reducing the influence of ethnic Khakas in Khakassia, citing the fact that he was appointed head of the State Geocadastre Service of Khakassia following the liquidation.

The young members continued to operate underground, declaring their intention to host a 9th Congress without the involvement of the older members in 2007. This was complicated by Lebed's order to all government and municipal authorities to refuse any requests to hold the event, as well as the Council of Khakas Elders under the leadership of Vladislav Torosov, which declared Çon çobį's congress to be illegitimate.

Çon çobį staged protests in the Khakas capital of Abakan over the Russian government's language policy in 2010, claiming that the policies would lead to a destruction of the Khakas language and culture.
