= Law on languages of peoples of the Russian Federation =

Law of the Russian Federation

The Law on a Unified Graphic Base is the federal law of December 11, 2002 No. 165-ФЗ "On Amendments to Article 3 of the Law of the Russian Federation 'On the Languages of the Peoples of the Russian Federation'", which established the Cyrillic script as the only possible script for all peoples of the Russian Federation.

The bill was introduced by the deputy chairman of the Duma Committee on Nationalities, Kaadyr-ool Bicheldey, who sharply criticized the idea of switching the Tatar language into Latin. [...] According to Bicheldey, the introduction of the Latin alphabet in Tatarstan would threaten the overall security and integrity of Russia, and the precedent could create conditions for similar trends to emerge in other regions of the country. — lenta.ru

The trend that is increasingly being used in the practice of Tatar nationalist organizations — the use of the Latin alphabet when writing texts in the Tatar language — is worrying. As is known, this is one of the pan-Turkist projects aimed at alienating Turkic ethnic groups from the Russian socio-cultural paradigm. — National security — No. 2(31), 2014

Tatarstani President Mintimer Shaimiev shows considerable political independence [...] The ultimate goal of the reform is undoubtedly political. It brings Tatars closer [...] with their brothers from the independent countries of Central Asia and the Muslims of the Middle East. And most importantly, it destroys one of the few factors of unity of the Russian Federation: the use of the same alphabet, which allows easy access to the Russian language. This law, which is disturbing in itself, may become an example for other peoples in the Federation. — Hélène Carrère d'Encausse

== Chronology of events ==
In the fall of 1999, the State Council of Tatarstan adopted a law on the transition of the Tatar language to the Latin alphabet. Experimental teaching was introduced in some schools, newspapers began to be published, and books appeared in the Latin alphabet.

On November 27, 2002, the State Duma of Russia adopted amendments to the law "On the Languages of the Peoples of the Russian Federation", thereby repealing the Tatar "Law on the Restoration of the Tatar Alphabet Taking into Account the Latin Script". According to the new legislative norm, on the territory of Russia, the alphabets of the state language of the Russian Federation and the state languages of the federal republics, are built on the graphic basis of the Cyrillic alphabet.

Deputies Safiulin and Khusnutdinov called the new law an attempt to "create a problem out of thin air" and appealed to the Constitutional Court.

In 2004 the court rejected the appeal.

Farid Mukhametshin made it clear that the issue is not closed and that after some time Tatarstan will seek the adoption of a law at the federal level on the possibility of translating Tatar graphics into Latin.

== See also ==
- Ems Ukaz
- Lithuanian press ban
- Cyrillization of Polish under the Russian Empire
- Marxism and Problems of Linguistics
