= The Letters =

The Letters may refer to:

- The Letters (album), a 2021 album by Brokenteeth
- The Letters (2014 film), a film based on the life of Mother Teresa
- The Letters (1973 film), an American made-for-television drama film
- The Letters (novel), a 2008 romance novel
- The Letters of Sacco and Vanzetti, a 1928 collection of letters
- "The Letters", a 1971 song by King Crimson from the album Islands (King Crimson album)

== See also ==
- Letter (disambiguation)
- The Letter (disambiguation)
- Maktubat (disambiguation)
