= Letter =

Letter, letters, or literature may refer to:

== Characters typeface ==
- Letter (alphabet), a character representing one or more of the sounds used in speech or none in the case of a silent letter; any of the symbols of an alphabet
- Letterform, the graphic form of a letter of the alphabet, either as written or in a particular type font
- Rehearsal letter in an orchestral score

== Communication ==
- Letter (message), a form of written communication
  - Mail
- Letters, the collected correspondence of a writer or historically significant person
  - Pauline epistles, addressed by St. Paul to various communities or congregations, such as "Letters to the Galatians" or "Letters to the Corinthians", and part of the canonical books of the Bible
  - Maktubat (disambiguation), the Arabic word for collected letters
- The letter as a form of second-person literature; see Epistle
  - Epistulae (Pliny)
  - Epistolary novel, a long-form fiction composed of letters (epistles)
- Open letter, a public letter as distinguished from private correspondence
- Letter to the editor, a letter sent to a newspaper, magazine, or online publication by one of its readers and meant to be published
- Encyclical letter in the Catholic Church
- Apostolic letter (litterae apostolicae), a type of ecclesiastical letter in the Catholic Church
- Letter (paper size), paper conventionally sized for letter-writing

== Education ==
- Letters, an obsolete synecdoche for literacy; e.g. "He knows his letters"
- Literature as in Letters, Arts and Sciences
- Varsity letter, an award given in the U.S. for interscholastic or intercollegiate merit in a sport or other activity such as band or orchestra

== Music ==
- Letters (Jimmy Webb album), 1972
- Letters (Sainkho Namchylak album), 1993
- Letters (Butch Walker album), 2004
- Letters (Matt Cardle album), 2011
- Letters (Bish album), 2020
- "Letters" (Monica song), 2023
- "Letters" (Hikaru Utada song), 2002
- "Letters" (Wolf Howl Harmony song), 2025
- "Letters", a song by Chance the Rapper from the album Star Line, 2025
- "Letters", a song by Frank Turner from the album Undefeated, 2024

== Places ==
- Letters, Ross-shire, a small village on the coast of Loch Broom, Scotland
- Letter railway station in Germany
- Letter, a townland in Kilcar, County Donegal, Ireland

== People ==
- Douglas Letter, American lawyer and general counsel
- Megan Letter (born 1995), American YouTuber
- Stephan Letter (born 1978), German serial killer

== Other uses ==
- LETTERS, a 1979 novel by John Barth
- John Letters, a Scottish manufacturer of golf clubs
- Letters (sculpture), a 1915 work by Charles Keck

== See also ==
- The Letter (disambiguation)
- Letterer, a member of a team of comic book creators responsible for drawing the comic book's text
- Letterman (disambiguation)
- Lettering, and calligraphy
- letter can be representing incoming mail
