= The Letter =

The Letter may refer to:

== Literature ==
- "The Letter" (poem), a poem by Wilfred Owen (1893–1918)
- "The Letter", a short story in W. Somerset Maugham's 1926 collection The Casuarina Tree
- "The Letter", 38th sura of the Qur'an
- The Letters (novel), 2008 romance novel

== Film ==
- The Letter (1929 film), directed by Jean de Limur starring Jeanne Eagels, adapted from the Somerset Maugham play
- The Letter (1940 film), directed by William Wyler starring Bette Davis, also adapted from the Somerset Maugham play
- The Letter (1982 film), a TV film
- The Letter (1997 film), a South Korean film also known as Pyeon ji
- The Letter (1999 film), a Portuguese film by Manoel de Oliveira
- The Letter (2003 film), an American documentary about immigration in Maine
- The Letter (2004 film), a Thai remake of the 1997 Korean film, also known as Jod mai rak
- The Letter (2012 film), an American film starring Winona Ryder and James Franco
- The Letter (2019 film), a Kenyan documentary film
- The Letter: A Message for our Earth, a 2022 documentary about Pope Francis Laudato si' encyclical and environmental champions from around the world

== Music ==
- The Letter (Judy Garland album), 1959
- The Letter/Neon Rainbow, a 1967 album by the Box Tops
- The Letter (Don & Dewey song), 1958
- "The Letter" (Box Tops song), 1967, later covered by Joe Cocker
- "The Letter" (Conway Twitty and Loretta Lynn song), 1976
- "The Letter", a 2003 song by A-Teens
- "The Letter," a song by Outkast from their 2003 album Speakerboxxx/The Love Below
- "The Letter", a song by PJ Harvey from her 2004 album Uh Huh Her
- "The Letter", a song by James Morrison from his 2006 debut album Undiscovered
- "The Letter" (Midnight Youth song), 2008
- "The Letter" (Hoobastank song), 2009
- "The Letter" (The Veils song), 2009
- The Letter (opera), a 2009 opera to be presented by the Santa Fe Opera and based on the 1927 play by W. Somerset Maugham
- The Letter (Avant album), 2010
- The Letter (Cosa Brava album), 2012
- "The Letter", a 2013 single from Davichi
- The Letter (Lemar album), 2015
- "The Letter", a song by Eleanor Friedberger from her 2018 album Rebound

== Television ==
- The Letter, a 1982 television movie starring Lee Remick
- "The Letter" (Seinfeld), a 1992 episode of the TV series Seinfeld
- "The Letter", an episode of the TV series Miracles (2003)

== Other ==
- The Letter (video game), a 2014 mystery horror video game for the Wii U eShop
- The Letter (play), a 1927 drama by W. Somerset Maugham from his own short story of the same name
- The Letter (ter Borch), a 1660-1665 painting by Gerard ter Borch

== See also ==
- The Letters (disambiguation)
- Letter (disambiguation)
