= Seated Girl in Peasant Costume =

Painting by Gerard ter Borch

- Zittende jonge vrouw in het kostuum van een boerenmeisje (Dutch)
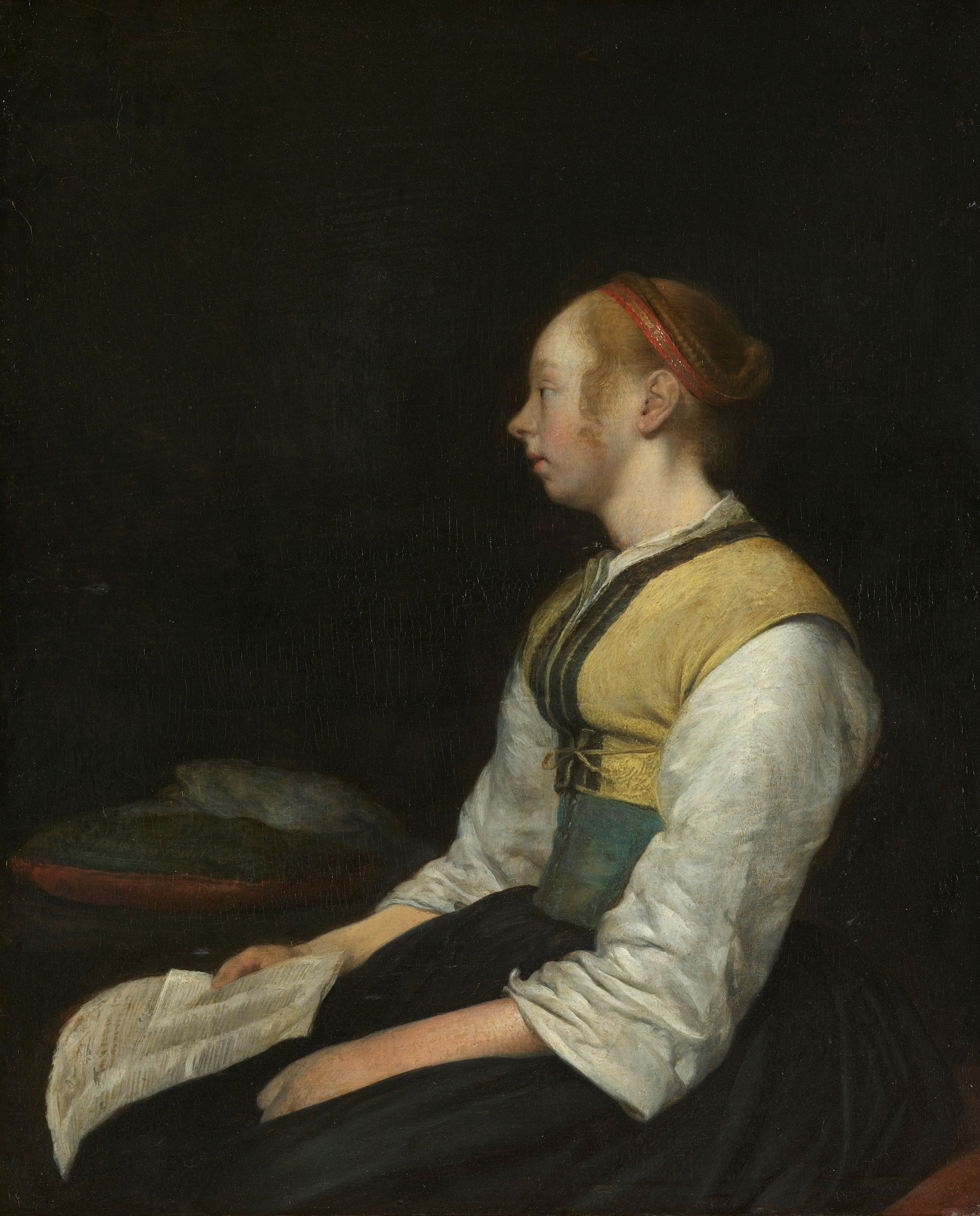
- Artist: Gerard ter Borch
- Year: c. 1650
- Medium: Oil on wood
- Dimensions: 28 cm × 33 cm (11 in × 13 in)
- Location: Rijksmuseum; Amsterdam

Seated Girl in Peasant Costume is an oil-on-panel painting by Dutch artist Gerard ter Borch, created c. 1650. It is held in the Rijksmuseum, in Amsterdam.

== Description ==
The painting depicts a girl dressed in peasants' clothing. She can be recognized as an unmarried farmer's daughter by her braids and red hairband. She is seated in a dark room, holding a printed piece of paper in her right hand, while she appears to be thinking with a nostalgic look. She may have been reading a love letter, which would explain her thoughtful face. Ter Borch probably chose his half-sister, Gesina ter Borch, as a model for this genre piece. She was a model for many of his paintings.

== Provenance ==
The work came from the private collection of Isaac de Bruyn and Johanna Geertruida van der Leeuw. This couple bequeathed the work to the Rijksmuseum in 1961.
