= The Letter (ter Borch) =

Painting by Gerard ter Borch

- De Brief (Dutch)
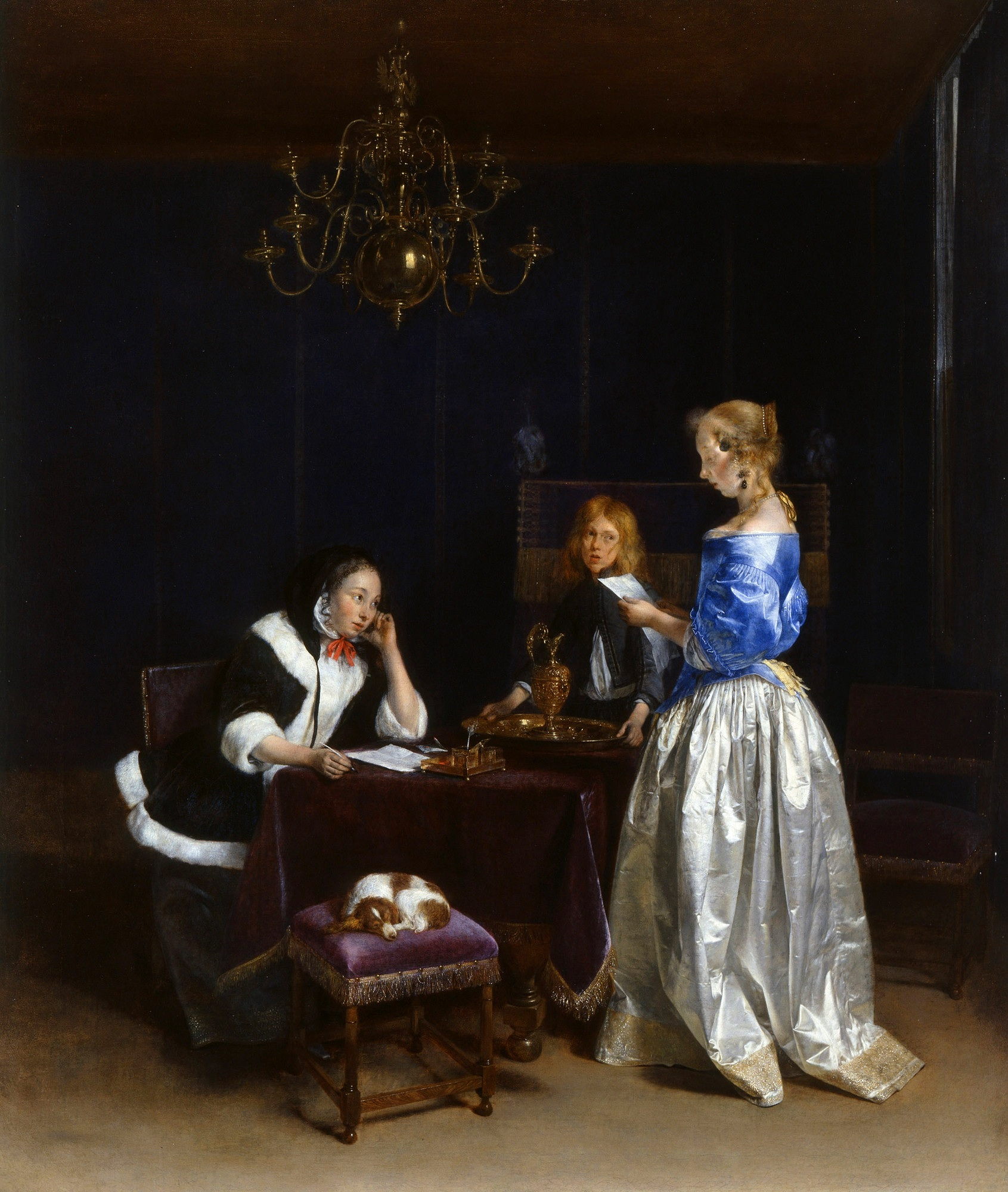
- Artist: Gerard ter Borch
- Year: c. 1660–1665
- Medium: Oil on canvas
- Dimensions: 81.9 cm × 68.4 cm (32.2 in × 26.9 in)
- Location: The Royal Collection

The Letter is an oil on canvas painting by the Dutch artist Gerard ter Borch, created c. 1660–1665. The work is in the British Royal Collection. It was purchased by King George IV in 1814 from the collection of the British banker Sir Thomas Baring. Earlier, in 1805, it had been acquired by Baring's father, at a time when many Dutch paintings from the 17th century were being sold abroad.

== Description and models ==
The painting depicts three people, two women and a boy, reunited around a table with several objects. In the foreground there is a chair on which a small dog is sleeping. The background of the room is otherwise dark, although a chandelier is visible through a reflection. The interior, although of limited visibility, is typically Dutch.

The fashionably dressed lady on the right is strongly lit and is clearly the main character of the scene. She reads a letter, while the boy in the middle and the woman on the left, who was apparently also writing a letter, stare at her. They closely observe her reaction, but the interpretation of what goes on psychologically between the figures remains a mystery, and is left to the viewers mind.

The Letter was probably painted in ter Borgh's home in Deventer, where he made most of his works. At least two models in the painting are his relatives. The boy in the middle is certainly his half-brother Moses, while the letter-reading lady on the right is his half-sister Gesina, a regular model for him. Ter Borch often used relatives and acquaintances as models. Even the dog on the chair is probably his own, as the animal appears in several of his paintings.

== Analysis ==
The painting is clearly set up in the style of the Dutch fijnschilders. The texture of the fabrics, especially of the main character, has been rendered with the utmost care. The metallic reflection of the blue and yellow of her clothing, which indicates a certain wealth, is striking. The refined elaboration, such as the embroidered border at the bottom of the dress, and the details within the quality of the silk, are almost unparalleled for that time.

Ter Borch depicts details such as the tray and candlestick held by the boy, the inkwell on the table beside the woman on the left, and the faintly visible chandelier against the dark background. Diffused light illuminates the figures and objects within the domestic interior. The overall effect is realistic, with a strong emphasis on the harmonious simplicity of domestic life.

Ter Borch painted many of these anecdotal works, often with the same models and with few changing elements, very similar in atmosphere. Characters reading letters or writing letters are often central. Because these figures have an intimate relationship with each other from a psychological point of view, the viewer is, as it were, excluded: he can only guess the circumstances of the event. Depicting veiled meanings in this way, often of the amorous kind, was usual that time and can also be observed in many of ter Borch's colleagues.
