= Maktub =

Maktub is an Arabic phrase which translates to "it is written". It may also refer to:

- Maktub (band), a Seattle, Washington-based music group
- Maktub (2017 film), an Israeli comedy film
- Maktub (2011 film), a Spanish comedy-drama film
- Maktub (book), a 1994 book by Paulo Coelho
- Maktub (Motherjane album), a 2008 album by the Indian Rock Band Motherjane

== See also ==
- Maktubat (disambiguation)
