= Cornelis de Graeff (Dutch noble, born 1650) =

Dutch nobleman

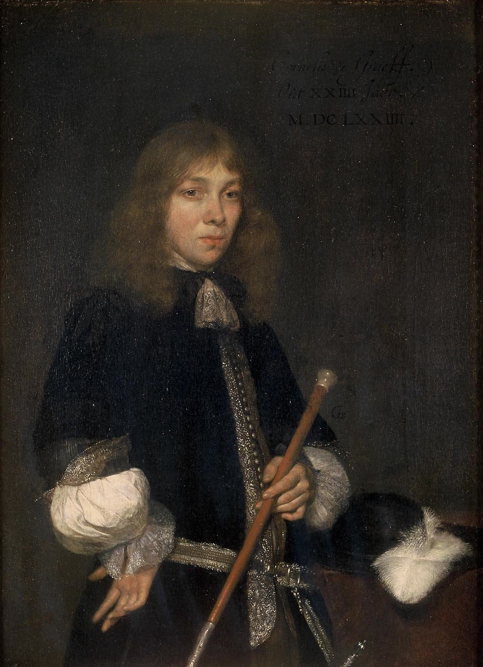
Portrait of Cornelis de Graeff, painted by Gerard Terborch (1673)

Knight Cornelis de Graeff (19 May 1650 in The Hague – 16 October 1678 in The Hague) was a Dutch nobleman and a water board member of the Zijpe and Haze Polder.

== Biography ==
He was a member of the family De Graeff and was the only survived son of Andries de Graeff and his nice Elisabeth Bicker van Swieten (1623-1656), daughter of burgomaster Cornelis Bicker (van Swieten) and Aertge Witsen, both patents from powerful patrician families of Amsterdam. Dutch Grand Pensionary Johan de Witt was a cousin of him, burgomasters Cornelis Geelvinck and Lambert Reynst his uncles. Cornelis de Graeff grew up in The Hague, while his father was Statutory auditor of the Court of Audit of Holland and West-Friesland ("Meester ordinaris van de Rekenkamer van Holland en West-Friesland"). A

After De Graeff studied law at the University of Leiden he married in 1675 to Agneta Deutz (1657–1678), daughter of Jean Jan Deutz and Geertruid Bicker (daughter of Jan Bicker and Agneta de Graeff van Polsbroek, herself a full aunt of Cornelis). His brother-in-law Jean Jan Deutz, Vrijheer van Assendelft was married to Maria Boreel, member of an outstanding family. The married couple inhabited the Amsterdam city palace Huis van der Graeff, in the middle of the Gouden Bocht block in Amsterdam, at what is now Herengracht 446. Three children came from this union, but they all died young before 1678. In 1677 he was styled as an Imperial Knight of the Holy Roman Empire. His father Andries said that they descent from the Austrian noble family Von Graben, which was an apparent (or illegitimate) branch of the House of Meinhardin. That diplome dadet from July 19, 1677. Diplom loaned to Andries de Graeff and his son Cornelis:

"Fide digis itegur genealogistarum Amsteldamensium edocti testimoniis te Andream de Graeff [Andries de Graeff] non paternum solum ex pervetusta in Comitatu nostro Tyrolensi von Graben dicta familia originem ducere, qua olim per quendam ex ascendentibus tuis ejus nominis in Belgium traducta et in Petrum de Graeff [Pieter Graeff], abavum, Johannem [Jan Pietersz Graeff], proavum, Theodorum [Dirck Jansz Graeff], avum, ac tandem Jacobum [Jacob Dircksz de Graeff], patrem tuum, viros in civitate, Amstelodamensi continua serie consulatum scabinatus senatorii ordinis dignitabitus conspicuos et in publicum bene semper meritos propagata nobiliter et cum splendore inter suos se semper gessaerit interque alios honores praerogativasque nobilibus eo locorum proprias liberum venandi jus in Hollandia, Frisiaque occidentale ac Ultrajectina provinciis habuerit semper et exercuerit."

Cornelis de Graeff and his wife both died after a banquet on the occasion of the Peace of Nijmegen and one and a half months before his father. His tomb chapel is to be found of at the Oude Kerk in Amsterdam. He was painted by famous artists like Gerard ter Borch and Jürgen Ovens. His sister Alida de Graeff, Vrijvrouwe of the high Lordship Jaarsveld, appeared as heir to the childless Cornelis.

== Coat of arms ==
Coat of arms

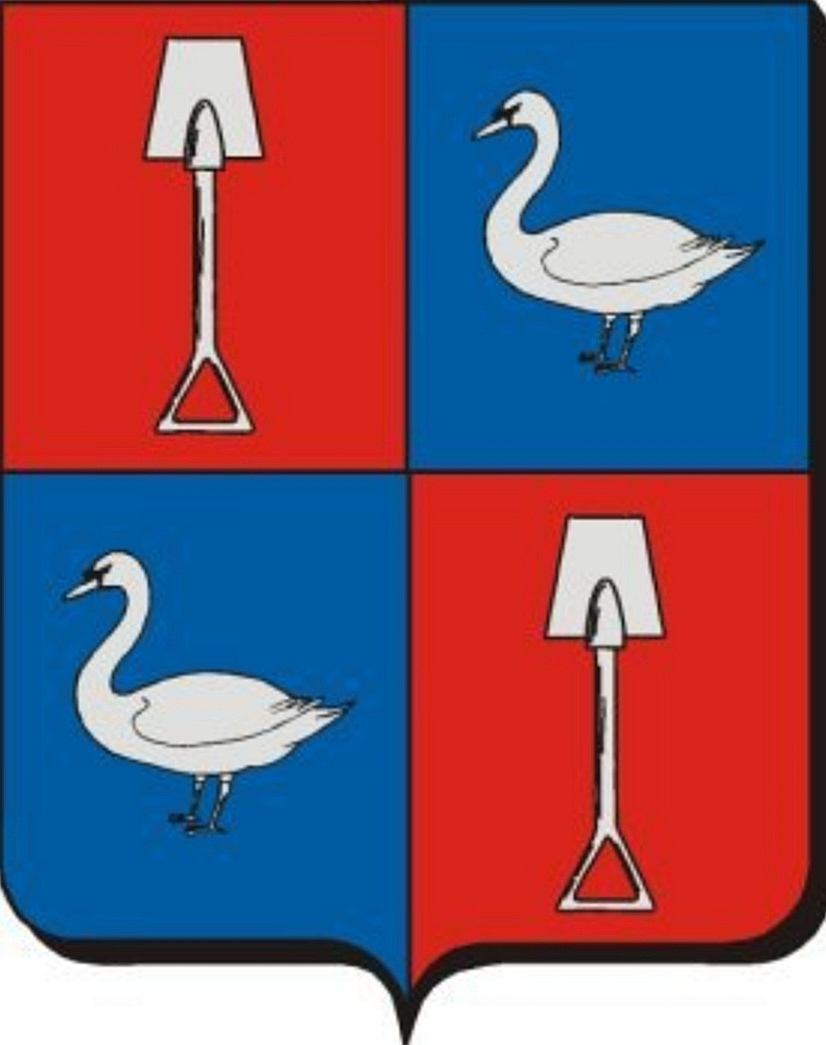
Ancient coat of arms

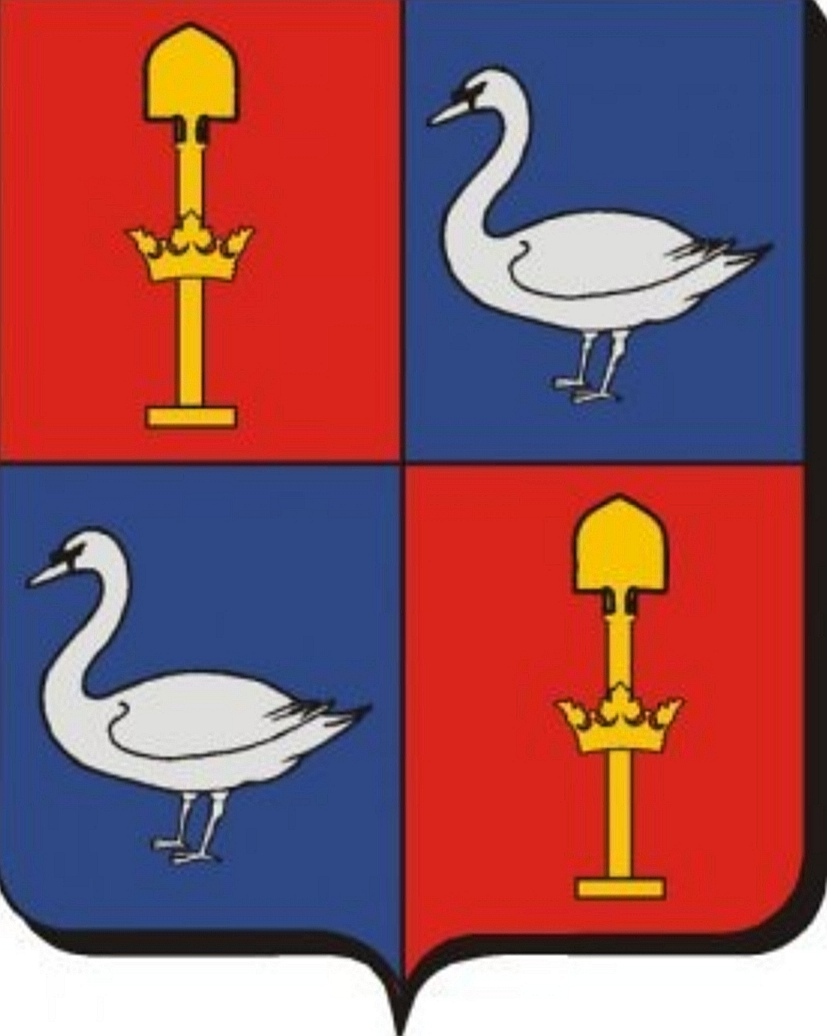
Personal coat of arms a Imperial knight (1677)

Cornelis de Graeff's coat of arms of origin is quartered and shows the following symbols:

- field 1 (left above) shows the silver shovel on red of their paternal ancestors, the Herren von Graben
- field 2 (right above) shows the silver swan on blue of the Fief Vredenhof
- field 3 (left below) shows the silver swan of their maternal ancestors, the De Grebber family of Waterland
- field 4 (right below), same as field 1
- helmet covers in red and silver
- helm adornment shows an upright silver spade with ostrich feathers (Herren von Graben)
- motto: MORS SCEPTRA LIGONIBUS AEQUAT (DEATH MAKES SEPTRES AND HOES EQUAL)

In 1677 Cornelis de Graeff was awarded the imperial knighthood and his coat of arms increased. His coat of arms was crowned, and the two shovels in the coat of arms were also gilded and additionally hung with golden crowns.

== Gallery ==
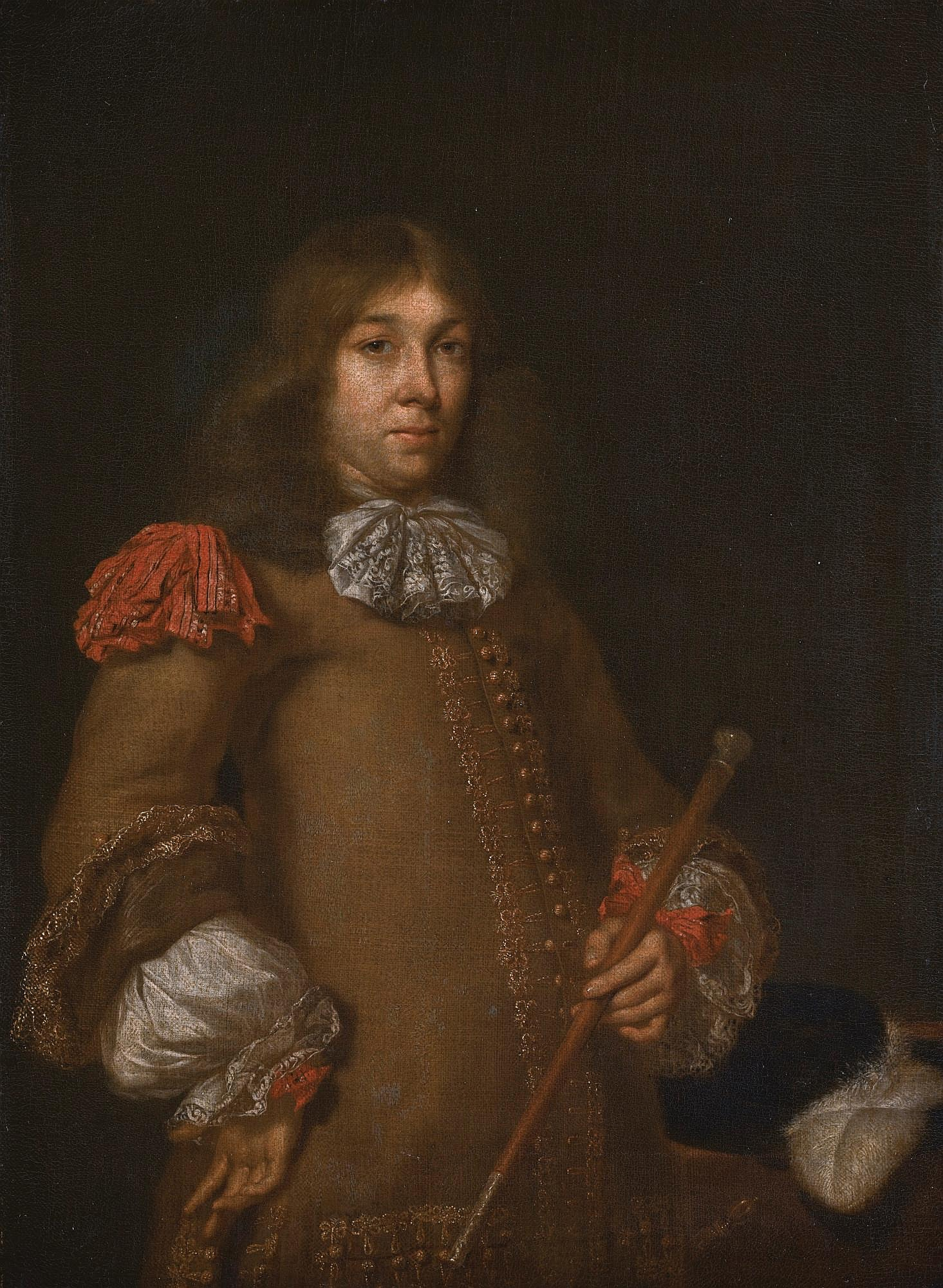
Cornelis de Graeff, painted by Gesina ter Borch

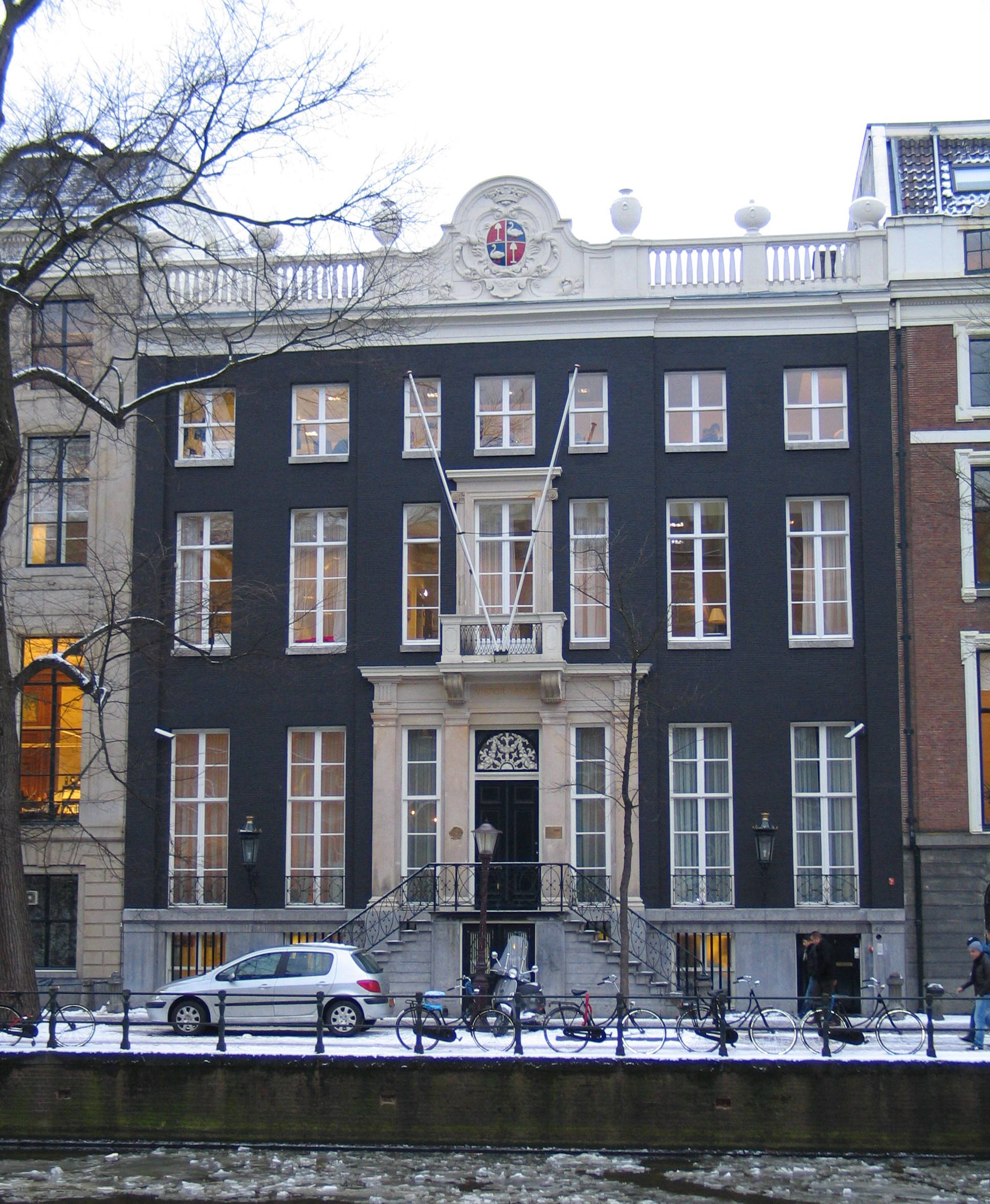
De Graeffs City palace Huis van der Graeff at the Gouden Bocht (Herengracht 446)

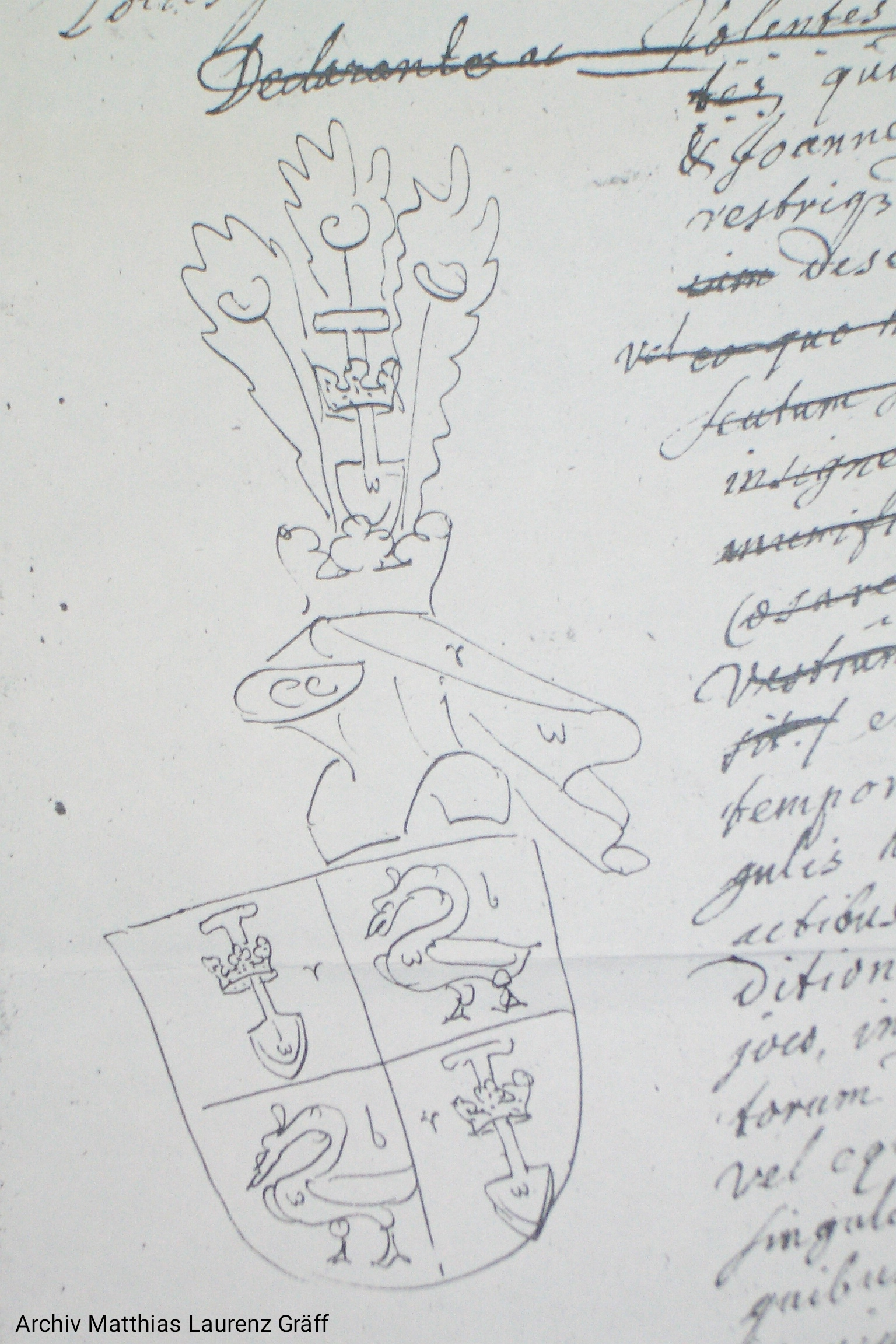
Coat of arms Cornelis de Graeff from 1677 (collection Matthias Laurenz Gräff)

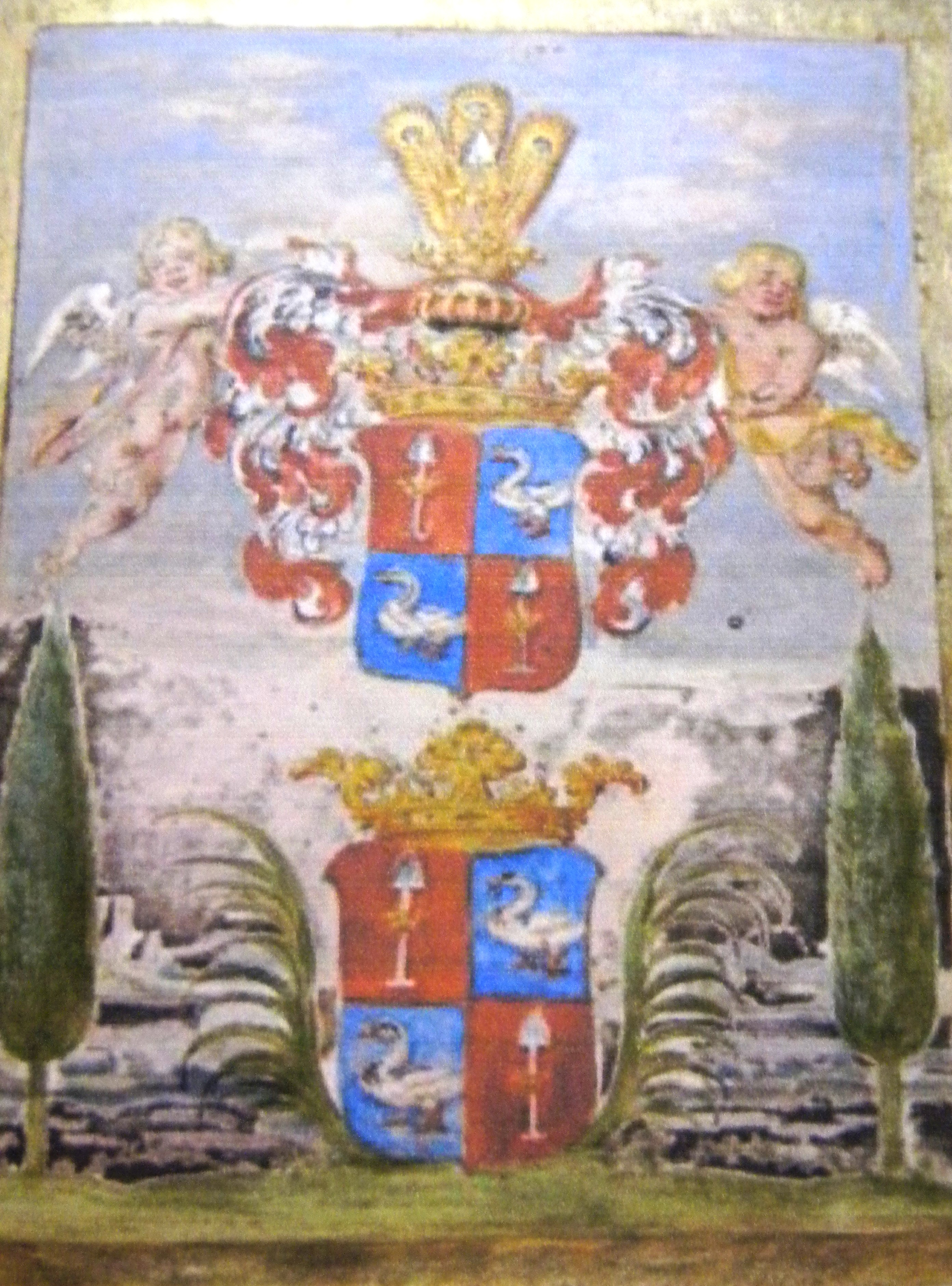
Coat of arms Cornelis de Graeff from 1677
