= Joseph Monninger =

American fiction writer and professor (1953–2025)

- Monninger in 2008
- Born: October 28, 1953; Baltimore, Maryland, U.S.
- Died: January 1, 2025 (aged 71)
- Education: Temple University (BA); University of New Hampshire (MA)
- Occupations: Writer, academic
- Writing career
- Period: 1981–2024 (as writer)
- Genres: Romantic, mystery, and young adult fiction; sports; nonfiction
- Subjects: Literature, Writing

Joseph Monninger (October 28, 1953 – January 1, 2025) was an American writer and Professor of English at Plymouth State University. He lived in Warren, New Hampshire. In his youth, Monninger was a Peace Corps volunteer. He was twice a recipient of National Endowment for the Arts fellowships.

In 2021, Monninger, a non-smoker, was diagnosed with terminal lung cancer. His book Goodbye To Clocks Ticking is a memoir of the first year after diagnosis. He died on January 1, 2025, at the age of 71. His death was announced on January 8.

== Books ==
- 1981: The Night Caller (ISBN 978-0-440-16674-0)
- 1982: The Family Man (ISBN 978-0-689-11235-5)
- 1983: The Summer Hunt (ISBN 978-0-689-11325-3)
- 1986: New Jersey (ISBN 978-0-345-34112-9)
- 1987: Second Season (ISBN 978-0-689-11936-1)
- 1991: Incident at Potter's Bridge (ISBN 978-1-55611-307-9), as Joe Monninger
- 1991: The Viper Tree (ISBN 978-0-671-70085-0)
- 1992: Biology Write Now! (ISBN 978-0-07-003143-2), co-written with T. L. Taigen
- 1993: Razor's Song (ISBN 978-0-380-71874-0)
- 1995: Mather (ISBN 978-1-55611-447-2)
- 1999: Home Waters: Fishing With an Old Friend (ISBN 978-0-7679-0515-2)
- 2001: A Barn in New England: Making a Home on Three Acres (ISBN 978-0-8118-4001-9)
- 2007: Two Ton: One Fight, One Night: Tony Galento v. Joe Louis (ISBN 978-1-58642-138-0)
- 2007: Baby (ISBN 978-1-59078-502-7)
- 2008: The Letters, co-written with Luanne Rice (ISBN 978-0-553-80741-7)
- 2008: Hippie Chick (ISBN 978-1-59078-598-0);
- 2010: Eternal on the Water (ISBN 978-1-4391-6833-2)
- 2010: Wish (ISBN 9780385739412)
- 2011: Finding Somewhere (ISBN 9780385739429)
- 2011: The World as We Know It (ISBN 9781451606348)
- 2012: Margaret from Maine (ISBN 9780452298682)
- 2014: The Major's Daughter (ISBN 9780452298699), as J.P. Francis
- 2014: Stay Alive: Crash (ISBN 9780545563482)
- 2014: Stay Alive: Cave-In (ISBN 9780545563529)
- 2014: Stay Alive: Breakdown (ISBN 9780545563550)
- 2014: Stay Alive: Flood (ISBN 9780545563598)
- 2015: Whippoorwill (ISBN 9780544531239)
- 2017: The Map That Leads to You (ISBN 9781250060761), as J. P. Monninger
- 2017: Game Change (ISBN 9780544531222)
- 2019: Seven Letters (ISBN 978-1-25-018769-7), as J. P. Monninger
- 2023: Goodbye to Clocks Ticking: How We Live While Dying (ISBN 978-1586423605)

== Sources ==
- Interview at Peace Corps Writers
- Faculty profile at Plymouth State University
