= Gerard ter Borch the Elder =

Dutch painter

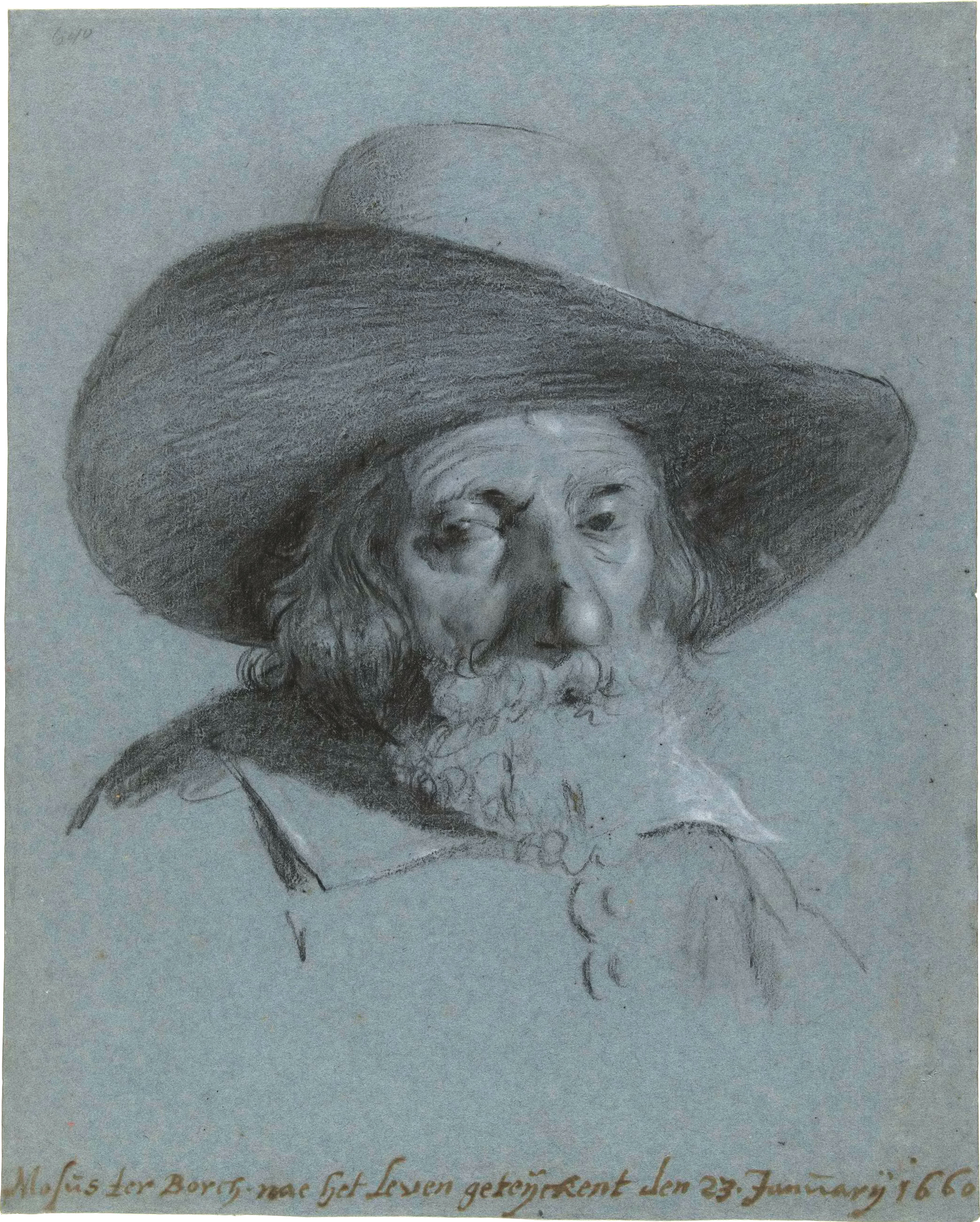
Portrait of Gerard ter Borch by his son Moses

Gerard ter Borch (1583 in Zwolle – 1662 in Zwolle), was a Dutch Golden Age painter.

According to Arnold Houbraken, who referred to him as Gerard ter Borch's father, he was a good painter who had spent many years in Rome and who was the first teacher of his better known son.

According to the RKD, he was the pupil of Pieter de Molijn and became the father of the painters Gerard II, Gesina, Harmen and Moses. He was in Italy during the years 1604–1611.

== Gallery ==
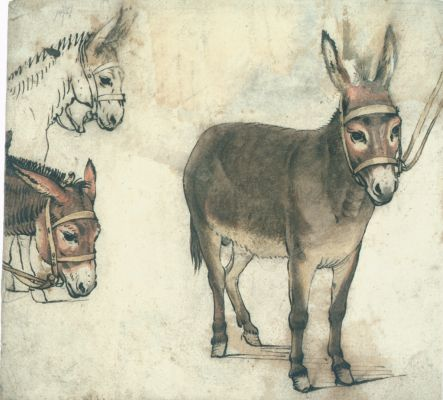
Study of a Donkey, 1612

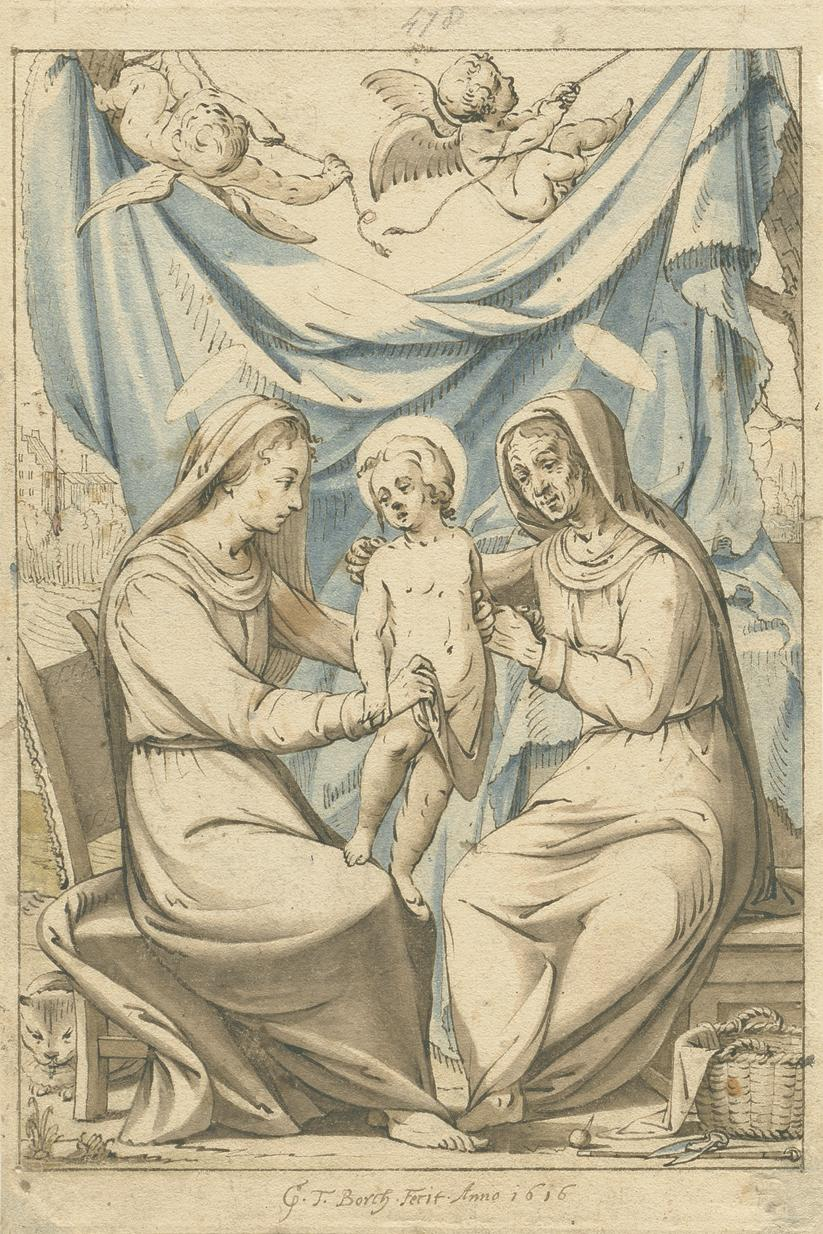
Mary, Jesus and Anna, 1616

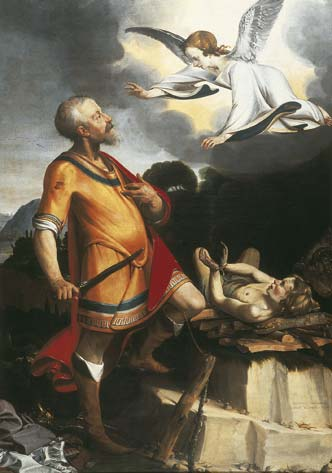
The Sacrifice of Abraham 1618–1619

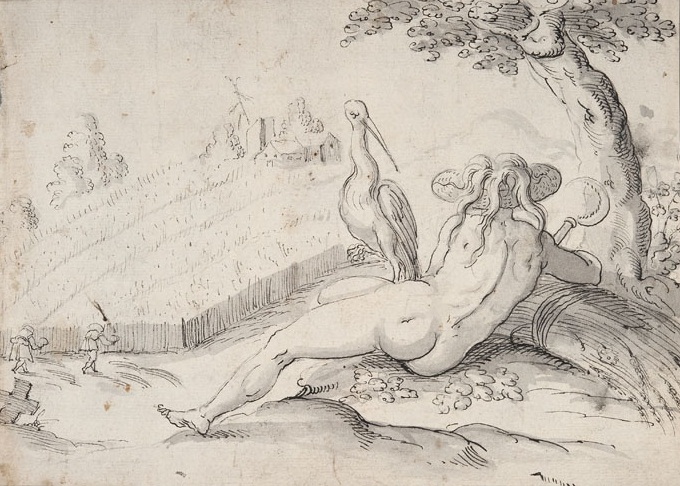
Allegory of Summer, ca. 1626

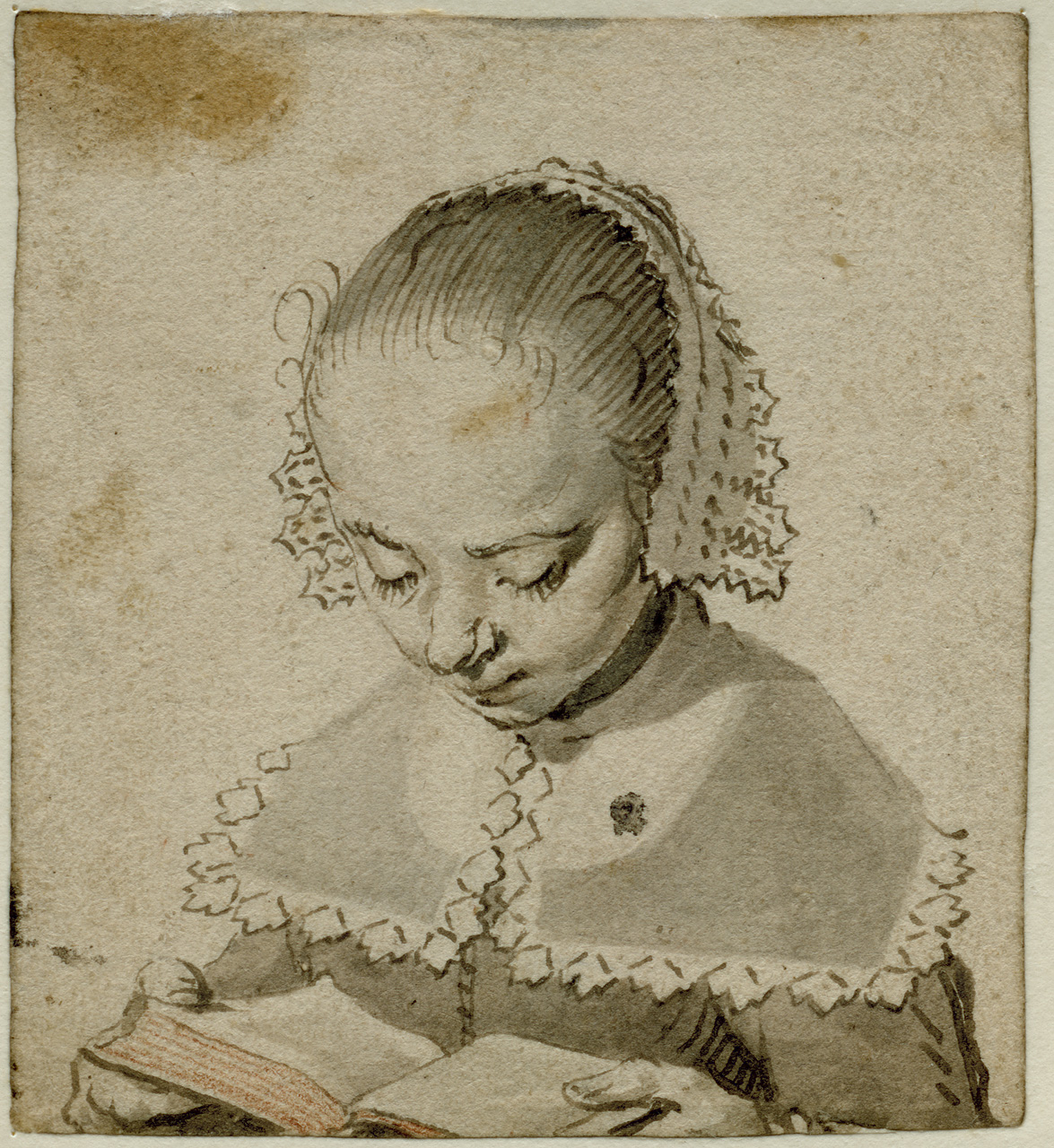
Girl reading, ca. 1630
