= Battle of Landguard Fort =

Battle of the Second Anglo-Dutch War

- Part of the Second Anglo-Dutch War
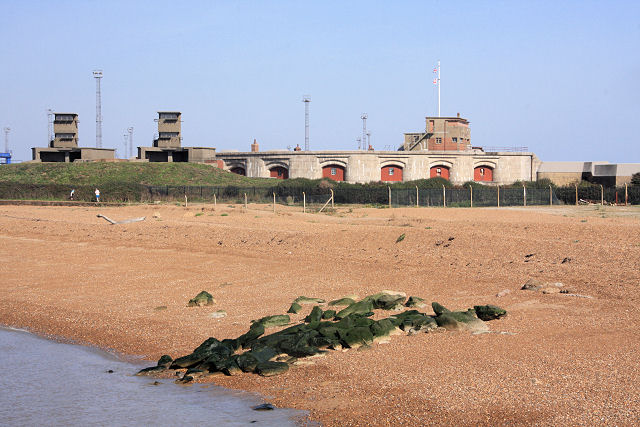
- Present-day Landguard Fort. The Dutch attacked this side of the fort.
Date	2 July 1667
Location	Landguard Fort, Suffolk, mouth of River Orwell, England 51.938886°N 1.321110°E
Result	English victory

Belligerents
Dutch Republic	England

Commanders and leaders
Thomas Dolman; Michiel de Ruyter; Willem Joseph van Ghent	Nathaniel Darrell; James Howard

Strength
1,500 marines and 500 sailors	450 militia and marines 500 infantry (arrived late in battle); 1 galliot

Casualties and losses
150 killed, wounded or captured	10 casualties

The Battle of Landguard Fort or the Attack on Landguard Fort was a battle towards the end of the Second Anglo-Dutch War on 2 July 1667 where a Dutch force attacked Landguard Fort near Felixstowe. It was intended to clear the way for an attack on the English Royal Naval anchorage at Harwich. After repeated attempts the Dutch attack planned by Michiel de Ruyter was repelled and as a result the planned attack on Harwich was abandoned. It was one of the last battles of the war in Europe before the Treaty of Breda was signed.

== Background ==
In the aftermath of the great Dutch victory on the Medway in June 1667 Michiel de Ruyter now had command of the Thames Estuary which allowed the Dutch to establish a naval blockade of London. Further attempts to operate in the Thames met with less success, and so at the start of July de Ruyter decided to attack Harwich, the next good safe anchorage up the coast from the Thames, and a naval base since 1657.

Before they could attack Harwich itself the Dutch needed to neutralize Landguard Fort, the port's outermost line of defense. Landguard Fort is situated on a spit of land that runs south from Felixstowe across the mouth of the River Stour and River Orwell estuaries, and was built to protect the anchorage at Harwich, on the opposite side of the estuary. The governor of Landguard Fort was Nathanial Darrell and was defended by 400 experienced musketeers of the Duke of York and Albany's Maritime Regiment. The Fort itself had forty cannon with approximately one-hundred men and officers for gun crews.

== Battle ==
Dutch Attack on Harwich, July 1667, by Willem van de Velde the Elder

De Ruyter split two of his squadrons in the attack with one squadron operating inside the estuary and one out to sea. As they moved forward they came across unexpectedly shallow water which meant that the attack from the estuary was totally abandoned, but seaward squadron could fire a few shots at long range. He had intended to support this attack with naval gunfire at relatively close range but De Ruyter still pressed ahead.

The Dutch now sent the marines into boats and rowed to shore with some 1,500 marines and 500 sailors under the command of Colonel Thomas Dolman (a hardliner Parliamentarian turncoat), the English commander of the Dutch land forces. They landed on the coast to the north of the fort at Cobbold's Point. This put them out of range of the guns in the fort, but also meant that they had to split their forces. The Dutch left the smaller part of their force at the cliffs the vast majority of them sailors, and this left the marines to attack on their own. The marines marched south to attack the fort while they had the hard task of dragging their cannons across the shingle.

The English were alerted to the Dutch and soon prepared for action, they had warnings of possible Dutch attack especially after the defeat at Medway. The Dutch made no hesitation in launching an attack; ladders were brought forward and in action lasting forty-five minutes the Dutch were repelled by concentrated English fire which had caused some loss. The Dutch, however, did not give up; they reorganized and launched a second attack. This time a small English galliot had joined in the action firing grapeshot at the Dutch soldiers on the shore near the Fort. The shingle on the beach, sprayed by the shot acted like shrapnel causing the Dutch many casualties. Dolman was killed in this attack which created confusion and less than fifteen minutes later the leaderless Dutch marines retreated, leaving their ladders and other equipment behind. The English captured a number of prisoners and the Dutch suffered many casualties. The Dutch seaward squadron was only able to fire a few ineffective shots at long range.

While the Dutch marines had been attacking the fort, the sailors at their beachhead came under attack by the local trained militia, commanded by the Earl of Suffolk. Continuous English fire lasted until 10:00 pm at which point the sailors decided that with casualties rising and being unable to advance forward the decision to retreat was made. By now the Dutch were trapped onshore by low water until around 2:00 am on 3 July, giving 500 regular infantry under Major Legge time to arrive from Harwich. They too had been involved with some more skirmishing with the Dutch who had been retreating from the fort but no British cavalry arrived. Legge's men were soon badly outnumbered as the defeated Dutch marines soon joined forces with their men on the beachhead. No significant fighting took place and the Dutch were able to re-embark after 2:00 am, and by 6:00 am their fleet had sailed away from Harwich.

== Aftermath ==
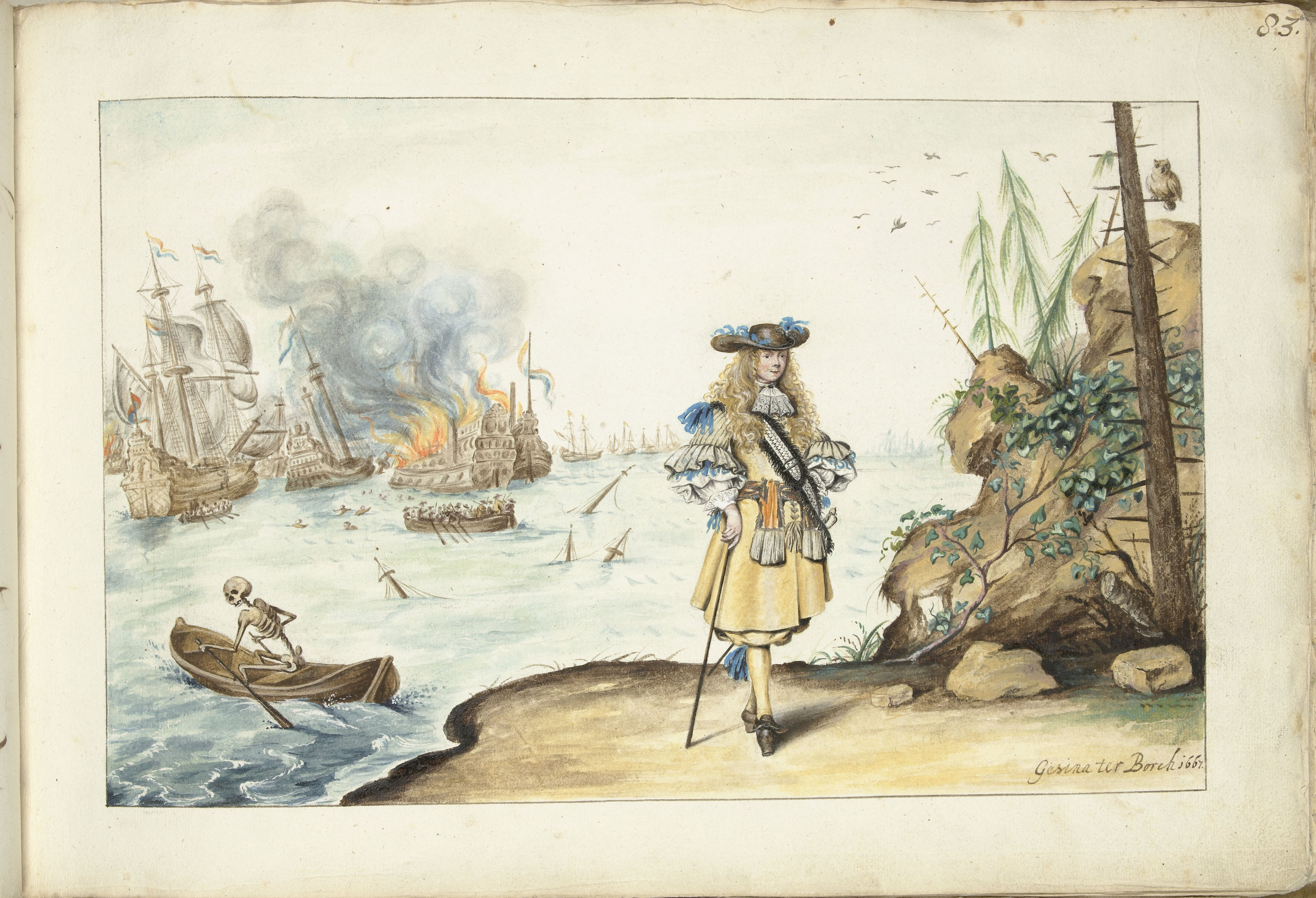
Moses ter Borch died from wounds received at the battle. Watercolour by his sister artist Gesina ter Borch

Losses for the Dutch were moderate they had suffered less than 150 killed, wounded or captured. The English loss was no more than 10 men but included Darrel who was wounded in the shoulder by a musket ball.

After the failure of this raid the Dutch settled down to blockade the Thames. De Ruyter sailed off to cruise up and down the English Channel, leaving Admiral Jan Jansse van Nes in charge of the blockade, which lasted until the end of July.

Further hostilities were ended by the Peace of Breda, which was signed on 31 July 1667.

=== Legacy ===
The attack was perhaps most noteworthy for being an early battle honour for both the English and Dutch marines. The Dutch Regiment de Marine had been founded by Michiel de Ruyter in 1665, and had won its first battle honour at Chatham during the attack on the Medway earlier in the year and they would later become the Netherlands Marine Corps. The garrison of Landguard were provided by the Duke of York and Albany's Maritime Regiment, raised in 1664 and one of the earliest precursors of the Royal Marines. The defense of Landguard was their first battle honour and it is recorded as the site of the last opposed invasion or attack of England.

The fort to this day is still in existence and is open to the public.

== Notes ==
Bibliography

- Clowes, William Laird (2003). The Royal Navy: A History - From the Earliest Times to 1900. Vol. 2. Chatham Publishing; New ed. ISBN 978-1861760104.
- Hussey, Frank (1983). Suffolk Invasion: The Dutch Attack on Landguard Fort, 1667. Terence Dalton. ISBN 978-0861380268.
- Longmate, Norman (2001). Island Fortress: The Defence of Great Britain 1606-1945. Pimlico. ISBN 978-0712668132.
- Rodger, N.A.M (2004). The Safeguard of the Sea'. Penguin History. ISBN 0-14-029724-3.
