= Luanne Rice =

American novelist (born 1955)

- Born: September 25, 1955 (age 70); New Britain, Connecticut, U.S.
- Occupation: Novelist
- Writing career
- Period: 1985–present
- Genre: Fiction
- Website: luannerice.net

Luanne Rice (born September 25, 1955) is an American novelist. Her 36 novels have been translated into 26 languages. She often writes about nature and the sea, and many of her novels deal with love and family. She is the author of The Lemon Orchard, Little Night, The Silver Boat and Beach Girls.

== Biography ==
Born in New Britain, Connecticut, Rice's first published poem appeared in the Hartford Courant when she was eleven, and her first short story was published in American Girl when she was fifteen. Her debut novel, Angels All Over Town, was published in 1985.

In 2002, Connecticut College awarded Rice an honorary degree and invited her to donate her papers to the college's Special Collections Library. She has also received an honorary doctorate of humane letters from St. Joseph College in West Hartford, Conn. In June 2014, she received the 2014 Connecticut Governor’s Arts Award in the Literary Arts category for excellence and lifetime achievement as a literary artist.

Rice is an avid environmentalist and advocate for families affected by domestic violence.

Several of Rice's novels have been adapted for television, including Crazy in Love for TNT, Blue Moon for CBS, Follow the Stars Home and Silver Bells for the Hallmark Hall of Fame, and Beach Girls for a summer 2005 mini-series on Lifetime.

Rice contributed a monologue to Motherhood Out Loud, a play that premiered at Hartford Stage Company and was performed Off-Broadway and at the Geffen Playhouse in Los Angeles.

Rice divides her time between New York City, Old Lyme, Connecticut, and Southern California.

== Bibliography ==
- 1985: Angels All Over Town (ISBN 9780689116162)
- 1988: Crazy in Love (ISBN 9780670821310)
- 1990: Stone Heart (ISBN 9780670832675)
- 1991: Secrets of Paris (ISBN 9780670827732)
- 1993: Blue Moon (ISBN 9780670843015)
- 1995: Home Fires (ISBN 9780553097283)
- 1999: Cloud Nine (ISBN 978-0553110630)
- 2000: Follow the Stars Home (ISBN 9780553110739)
- 2001: Dream Country (ISBN 9780553801194); Firefly Beach (ISBN 0739414771); Summer Light (ISBN 9780553801224)
- 2002: Safe Harbor (ISBN 978-0553802184); True Blue (ISBN 9780553588293)
- 2003: The Perfect Summer (ISBN 9780553897746); The Secret Hour (ISBN 9780553802245)
- 2004: Beach Girls (ISBN 0553587242); Dance With Me (ISBN 9780553802276); Silver Bells (ISBN 9780553804119)
- 2005: Lily Malone 1.Summer's Child (ISBN 0553587625); 2.Summer of Roses (ISBN 9780553804102)
- 2006: Sandcastles (ISBN 9780553804195)
- 2007: The Edge of Winter (ISBN 9780553805277)
- 2007: What Matters Most (ISBN 978-0-553-80533-8)
- 2008: Light of the Moon (ISBN 9780553805116); Last Kiss (ISBN 9780553805123); The Letters, co-written with Joseph Monninger (ISBN 9780739376607)
- 2009: The Geometry of Sisters (ISBN 9780553805130)
- 2010: The Deep Blue Sea for Beginners (ISBN 9780553589788)
- 2011: The Silver Boat (ISBN 9780670022502)
- 2012: Little Night (ISBN 9780670023561
- 2013: The Lemon Orchard (ISBN 9780670025275)
- 2013: The Night Before (ASIN: B00KB5P1B) DIGITAL, 24 PGS.
- 2016: The Secret Language of Sisters (ISBN 978-0545839556)
- 2017: The Beautiful Lost (ISBN 978-1338111071)
- 2019: Pretend She's Here (ISBN 978-1338298505)
- 2020: Last Day (ISBN 978-1542018203)
- 2021: The Shadow Box (ISBN 978-1542025188)
- 2024: Last Night
- 2024: If anything happens to me
- 2026: Until Midnight(4th installment of Kate and Conner)
