= Sainkho Namtchylak =

Russian singer (born 1957)

Sainkho Namtchylak Сайын-Хөө Намчылак
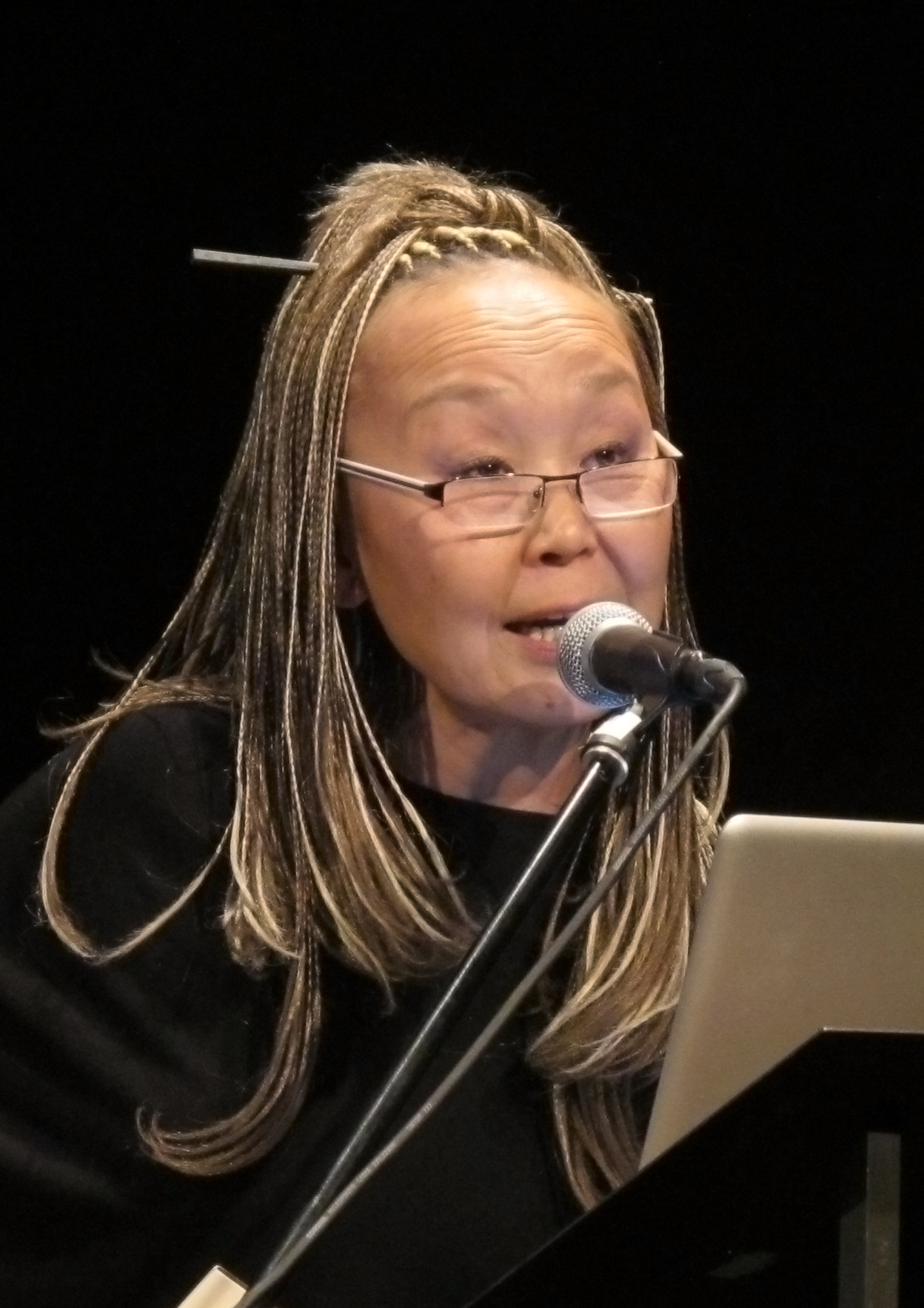
- Sainkho Namtchylak at Schamrock Festival 2014, Germany

Background information
- Born: 11 March 1957 (age 69); Tuvan Autonomous Oblast, Russian SFSR, Soviet Union (now Tuva Republic, Russia)
- Genres: Tuvan throat singing; world; folk; jazz improvisation; electronica
- Occupation: Singer-songwriter
- Instrument: Vocals
- Years active: 1990–present
- Website: sainkho.net

Sainkho Namtchylak (Tuvan: Сайын-Хөө Намчылак, romanized: Saiyn-Hoo Namchylak; Russian: Сайнхо Намчылак, romanized: Sainkho Namchylak; born 11 March 1957) is a Russian singer-songwriter from Tuva, an autonomous republic in the Russian Federation just north of Mongolia. She has resided in Vienna, Austria since 1991. She is known for her Tuvan throat singing (khöömei).

== Style ==
Namtchylak is an experimental singer, born in 1957 in a secluded village in the south of Tuva. She is proficient in overtone singing; her music encompasses avant-jazz, electronica, modern composition and Tuvan influences. In Tuva, numerous cultural influences collide: the Turkic roots and culture it shares with Central Asian states, Xinjiang, Bashkortostan and Tatarstan; the strong Mongolic cultural influence and traditions it shares with Mongolia, Inner Mongolia, Buryatia and Kalmykia; the cultural influences from the various Siberian nomadic ethnic groups such as Samoyeds, Yeniseians, Evenks and from the Russian Old Believers, the migrant and resettled populations from Ukraine, Tatarstan and other minority groups west of the Urals. All of these, to extents, impact on Namtchylak's voice, although the Siberian influences dominate: her thesis produced while studying voice, first at the University of Kyzyl, then in the Gnessin State Musical College in Moscow during the 1980s focussed on Lamaist and cult music of minority groups across Siberia, and her music frequently shows tendencies towards Tungus-style imitative singing.

Being the daughter of a pair of school-teachers, she grew up in an isolated village on the Tuvan–Mongolian border, exposed to the local overtone singing – something that was generally reserved for the males; in fact, females were actively discouraged from learning it (even now, the best-known practitioners remain male, artists like Huun-Huur-Tu and Yat-Kha). However, she learned much of her traditional repertoire from her grandmother, and went on to study music at the local college, but she was denied professional qualifications. Quietly she studied the overtone singing, as well as the shamanic traditions of the region, before leaving for study further in Moscow (Tuva was, at that time, part of the Soviet Union). Her degree completed, she returned to Tuva where she became a member of Sayani, the Tuvan state folk ensemble, before abandoning it to return to Moscow and joining the experimental Tri-O, where her vocal talents and sense of melodic and harmonic adventure could wander freely. That first brought her to the West in 1990, although her first recorded exposure came with the Crammed Discs compilation Out of Tuva. Once the Soviet Union had collapsed, she moved to Vienna, making it her base, although she traveled widely, working in any number of shifting groups and recording a number of discs that revolved around free improvisation – not unlike Yoko Ono – as well as performing around the globe. It was definitely fringe music, although Namtchylak established herself very firmly as a fixture on that fringe. In 1997, she was the victim of a serious attack that left her in a coma for several weeks. Initially she thought it was some divine retribution for her creative hubris, then she recorded Naked Spirit in 1998, which had new-age music leanings. However, by 2000, she seemed to have overcome that block, releasing Stepmother City, her most accessible work to date, where she seemed to really find her stride, mixing traditional Tuvan instruments and singing with turntables and effects, placing her in a creative firmament between Yoko Ono and Björk, but with the je ne sais quoi of Mongolia as part of the bargain. A showcase at the WOMEX Festival in Berlin brought her to the attention of many, and in 2001 a U.S. tour was planned.

== Career ==
After graduating, Namtchylak worked with several ensembles: the Moscow State Orchestra; the Moscow-based jazz ensemble Tri-O (since 1989); School of Dramatic Art under the direction of Anatoly Vasiliev (Moscow), various orchestras in Kyzyl, the Tuvan 'folkloric orchestra'—a far less sanitised example of folk baroque than, say, existed in pre-independence Kazakhstan—that has housed many of Tuva's other important singers. However, for several years Namtchylak annually invited foreign musicians to Tuva to promote Tuvan culture.

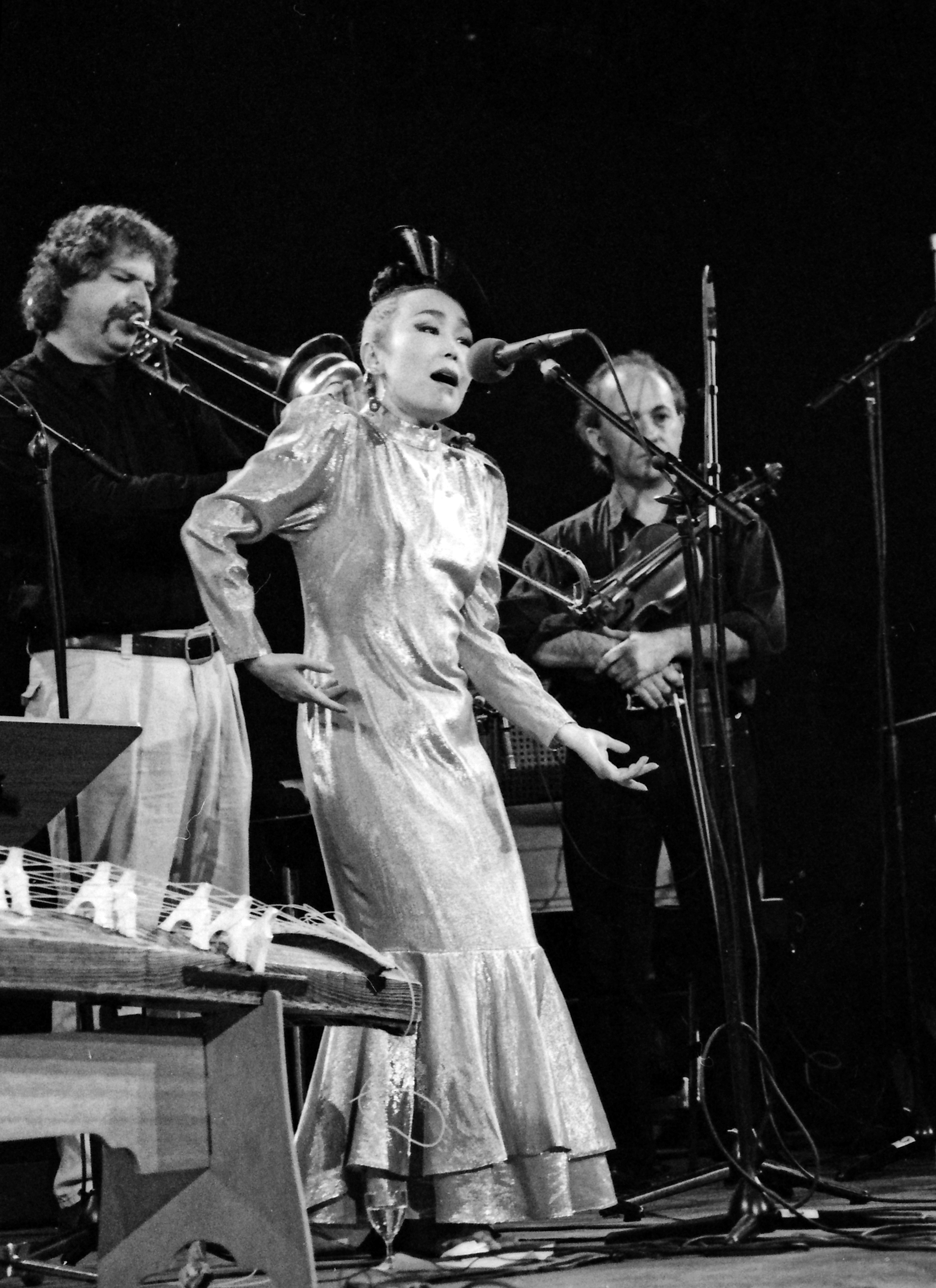
Namtchylak performing in 1991

Based in Vienna, Namtchylak sculpted Stepmother City to reflect her ambivalent feelings about European metropolis. Calling herself "first and foremost a woman from the Steppes," Namtchylak's first musical inspiration came from her nomadic grandmother, who would sing lullabies for hours. She grew up in a culture where people just sing when they feel like it—singing when they’re happy and singing when they’re sad. Denied professional credentials from a local college where her explorative nature led her toward forbidden male-dominated overtone singing styles, Namtchylak transferred to Moscow where she discovered Russian improvisation and where she also continue to study about vocal techniques of Siberian lamaistic and shamanistic traditions.

Audiences are astounded by the diversity of sounds Namtchylak can produce with her voice, from operatic soprano to birdlike squawks, from childlike pleas to soulful crooning; which at various moments elicit comparisons to Zap Mama, Patti Smith, Billie Holiday, and Nina Hagen. In 1997, Namtchylak was horrifically attacked by Tuvinian racketeers in Moscow which left her in a coma for two weeks. Again, sources regarding this contradict – others maintain that she underwent surgery for a severe malignant brain tumor; regardless, 1997 marked an appreciable change in her life. Since then, she has been resident in exile in Vienna, and has also recorded more prolifically as a solo artist – although she has released over thirty albums in the past twenty years, only seven have been entirely solo.

Namtchylak claims that music and spirituality are related by desire, or the tension that yells to reawaken people. Eager to take part in the process of remembering what has been forgotten, Stepmother City presents itself like a map, proposing routes to connect Western physicality with Eastern spirituality.

In 2005, the Italian publishing house Libero di Scrivere released a book of poetry Karmaland. In 2006 in Saint Petersburg, a book Chelo-Vek (a play on words in Russian, conflating "chelovek" meaning "person" and, though the hyphen, obsoletism "chelo" meaning "front" or "forehead" and "vek" meaning "age" or "eon" or "century", into something like "front-eon") was published in Russian, Tuvinian and in English.

in 2016, she released "like a bird or spirit, not a face", an album produced by Grammy-winner Ian Brennan (music producer, author) and featuring members of Tinariwen.

In 2024, together with Steven Brown, among others, she participated in Mirco Magnani's album Zarathustra – Der Große Mittag, performing lyrics from Thus Spoke Zarathustra by Friedrich Nietzsche.

== Discography ==
=== Albums ===
- 1990 – Transformation of Matter, Document, Vol. V, with Tri-O, Leo Records, London, UK
- 1991 – Tunguska-Guska: Eine Meteoriten-Oper, EFA-Schneeball, Germany
- 1991 – Lost Rivers, FMP, Berlin, Germany
- 1991 – When the Sun Is Out, You Don't See Stars, FMP, Berlin, Germany
- 1991 – Octet-Ost, with Christian Muthspiel, Amadeo, Austria
- 1992 – Marsias Song, with Mattias Ziegler and Mark Dresser, Zürich, Switzerland
- 1992 – Pulse, with Michael Sievert, Dizzy Essentials, Germany (Helmut Diez)
- 1993 – Letters, live recordings, Leo Records, London, UK
- 1993 – Live, with Kang Tae Hwan, Free Improvisation Network Record, Japan
- 1993 – Out of Tuva, Crammed World, Belgium
- 1993 – Expos Jazz & Joy, Ver Abra Records, Germany
- 1993 – Mixing It, Chill Out Label, London, UK
- 1993 – Synergetics Phonomanie III, Leo Records, London, UK
- 1994 – Live at City Garden, with Moscow Composers Orchestra, U-Sound
- 1994 – The First Take, with Biosintes, FMP 80, Berlin, Germany
- 1994 – Dancing on the Island, with Irene Becker, Olufsen Records, Denmark
- 1995 – Techno mit Störungen, with Jon Rose, Plag Dich Nicht, German
- 1996 – Mars Song, with Evan Parker, Victo, Canada
- 1996 – Amulet, with Ned Rothenberg, Leo Records, London, UK
- 1996 – An Italian Love Affair, with Moscow Composers Orchestra, Leo Records, London, UK
- 1996 – The Gift, with Moscow Composers Orchestra, Long Arms Records, Russia
- 1997 – Let Peremsky Dream, with Moscow Composers Orchestra, Leo Records, London, UK
- 1998 – Naked Spirit, Amiata Records
- 1998 – Kharms-10 Incidents, Long Arms Records, Russia
- 1999 – Aura, Solo: Sainkho, Duo: Peter Kowald & Sainkho, Trio: Sainkho & Vl. Volkov, Vl. Tarasov, Einsai Records
- 1999 – Temenos, Leo Records, London, UK
- 2000 – Stepmother City, Ponderosa
- 2001 – Homo Sonorus, International Anthology of Sound Poetry, poetry compilation, Vol IV, Russia
- 2001 – El Lebrijano, Lagrimas Cera, EMI International
- 2001 – Time Out: Seven Songs for Tuva, Ponderosa, Italy
- 2002 – Golden Years of the Soviet New Jazz, Vol. 3, Namtchylak with Pop-Mechanika 18 November 1989, Namtchylak with Mikchail Zukov 10 June 1990, Namtchylak + Tri-O 1989, 1991, Namtchylak with Sergey Letov 11 June 1989, 1991
- 2003 – Who Stole The Sky, Ponderosa, Italy
- 2005 – Arzhaana, a Musical Fairy Tale, Asia Plus Records, Russia
- 2005 – Forgotten Streets of St. Petersburg, Tri-O & Namtchylak, Leo Records, London, UK
- 2005 – Karmaland, Live CD add to the book Karmaland by LiberoDiscrivere, Italy
- 2007 – Tuva-Irish Live Music Project, electronics with Roy Carroll, Leo Records, London, UK
- 2008 – In Trance, acoustic duo with Jarrod Gagwin, Leo Records, London, UK
- 2008 – Mother-Earth! Father-Sky!, Huun-Huur-Tu feat. Namtchylak, Jaro Records, Germany
- 2009 – Portrait of an Idealist, Moscow Composer Orchestra feat. Namtchylak, Leo Records, London, UK
- 2009 – Tea Opera, electronics, with Dickson Dee, Leo Records, London, UK
- 2010 – Not Quite Songs, electro acoustic with Nick Sudnik, Leo Records, London, UK
- 2010 – Terra, jazz arranged songs with Wolfgang Puschnig, Paul Urbanek, Leo Records, London, UK
- 2010 – Cyberia, solo voice, Ponderosa Music and Art, Italy
- 2010 – Simply-Live, compilation of live recordings of Son Program, Tree Music, China
- 2013 – Go to Tuva, Sainkho & Garlo, BP12
- 2015 – Like a Bird or Spirit, Not a Face, Ponderosa Music & Art, Italy
- 2016 – Pulse of Karma, with Alpha & Co, Russia
- 2017 – 6.8.17, as SainkhoKosmos, Otoroku, UK
- 2019 – Echo of the Ancestors, as Sainkho Kosmos, Stallion Era, China
- 2020 – Earth, with Minim, KOLD, Poland
- 2020 – Antiphonen, Ned Rothenberg, Dieb13, Klanggalerie, Austria
- 2021 – Manifesto, with Minim, KOLD, Poland
- 2021 – Where Water Meets Water: Bird Songs & Lullabies, Ponderosa Music & Art, Italy
- 2021 – Ethno Tribal B.P.M., Drugaya Kultura Product, Free Flight Records Limited, Russia
- 2021 – Fixing the Fluctuating Ideas, with Evan Parker ElectroAcoustic Ensemble, Les Disques Victo, Canada
- 2022 – Survival Songs, Guangzhou Cuckoo Music Co., Ltd, China
- 2023 – Eternal Song of Ene-Sai, with Uchihashi Kazuhisa, Pollux, China
- 2024 – Zarathustra Der Große Mittag, with Mirco Magnani, Steven Brown, Nikolas Klau, Paganland 2024, Klanggalerie, Undogmatisch, Austria
- 2024 – Lost Rivers 2, Klanggalerie, Austria
- 2025 – Song for Leluhur, with Sabu Toyozumi, Masashi Harada, Kosei Yamamoto, Noriko Terukina, Chap Chap Records, Japan

=== Singles and extended plays ===
- 2001 – Stepmother City Remixes, Ponderosa Music & Art, Italy
- 2002 – Naked Spirit (Dance-Remixes E.P.), Sun Generation Records, Italy
- 2016 – Earthly Conditions (Remixes), Existence Records, Canada
- 2022 – Lightkeeper, with Slumberland, Morphine Records, Italy
- 2026 – Lilla Evening Reimagined, with Helfer and Age Is a Box, Ponderosa Music & Art, Italy

=== Compilation ===
- 1994 – The Rough Guide to World Music, World Music Network
- 1999 – Una Voce da Tuva, Voci in Viagio, Amiata Records, Italy
- 2007 – Nomad, compilation of best works by Namtchylak, dedicated to 50 anniversary, Leo Records, London, UK
- 2018 – The Songs, 11CD collection by Namtchylak, dedicated to 60 anniversary, Starsing Music, China
