= Letters (Sainkho Namchylak album) =

Live album by Sainkho Namchylak
- Released: 1993
- Length: 58:13
- Label: Leo Records
- Producer: Sainkho Namchylak, Leo Feigin

Letters is a live album by Tuvan musician Sainkho Namtchylak (spelled "Namchylak at the time of release), released in 1993 by Leo Records.

== Background ==
Letters is a conceptual album conceived around letters exchanged between Namtchylak and her father prior to his passing in 1992.

== Track listing ==
No.	Title	Length
1.	"Letter 1"	9:32
2.	"Letter 2"	10:12
3.	"Letter 3"	9:24
4.	"Letter 4"	6:33
5.	"Letter 5"	7:59
6.	"Letter 6"	13:58
7.	"Letter 7"	0:34
Total length:		58:13

== Personnel ==
Credits adapted from the album's liner notes.

=== Musicians ===
- Sainkho Namtchylak — voice
- Kieloor Entartet:
  - Mathias Kielholz — electric guitar
  - Mathias Gloor — synthesizer
  - Lucas N. Niggle — percussion
  - Joelle Leandre — bass
  - Mats Gustaffson — baritone saxiphone
  - Stan Sandell — piano, voice

=== Technical and design ===
- Tony Bridge — remastering
- Lora Denis — design
- Alexander Zabrin — photography
- H. Walkowski — photography
