= Moses ter Borch =

Dutch painter

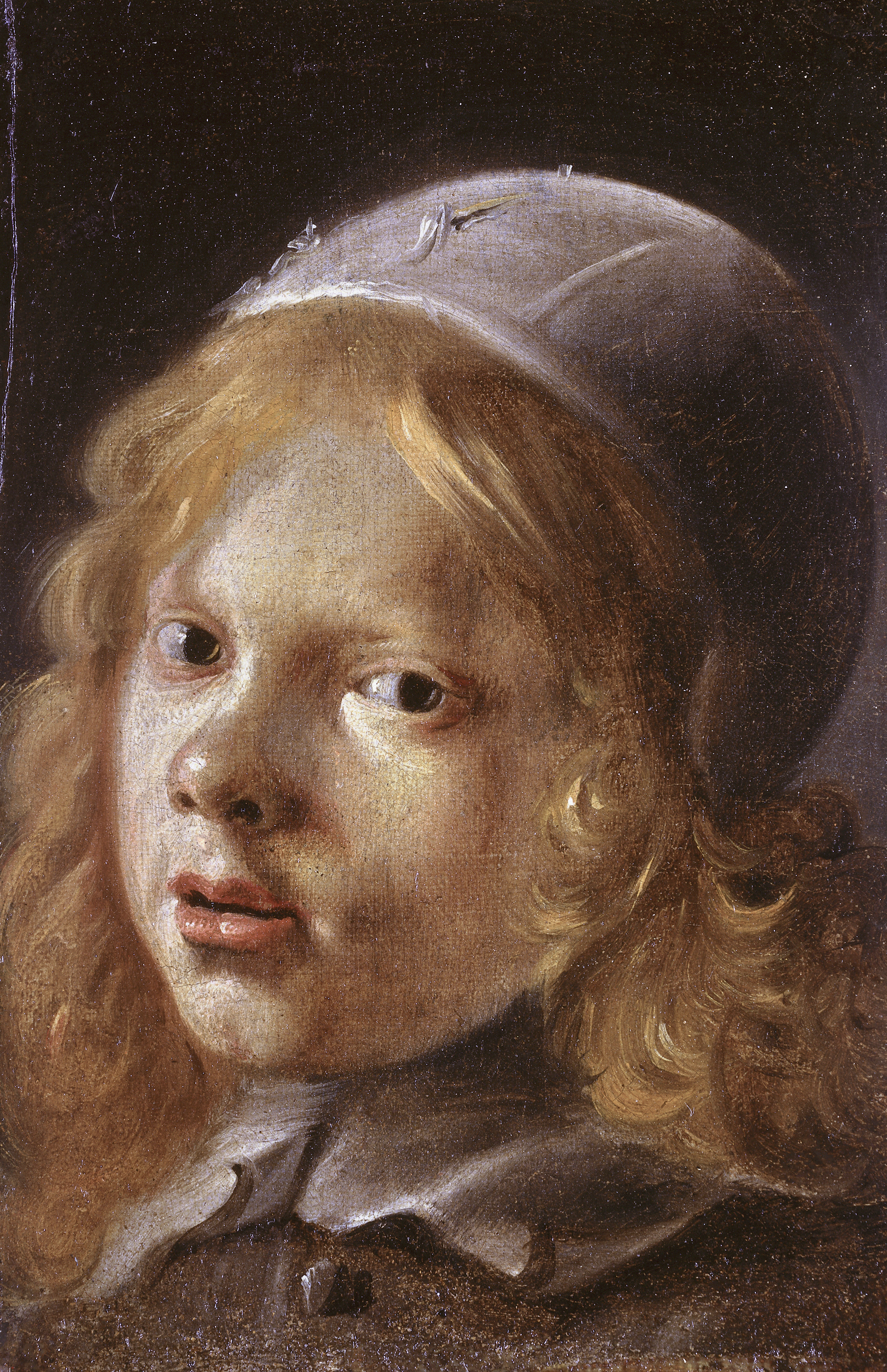
- Self-portrait, ca. 1660-1661
- Born: 19 June 1645; Zwolle
- Died: 12 July 1667; Harwich
- Known for: Drawing, Painting
- Movement: Baroque

Moses ter Borch or Mozes ter Borch (1645–1667) was a Dutch painter, draughtsman and enlisted sailor in the Dutch navy. His surviving work consists mostly of drawings. He died in battle during one of the Dutch fleet's engagements in England during the Second Anglo-Dutch War.

== Life ==
Moses ter Borch was born in Zwolle as the youngest son of Gerard ter Borch the Elder (1583 – 1662) and Wiesken Matthys. His father had initially been a painter but had by the time of Moses's birth changed careers to become a convoy and license master in Zwolle, a function he inherited from his own father. His elder siblings included his half-brother, the prominent genre painter Gerard ter Borch (1617 – 1681), his half-sister amateur artist Anna ter Borch (1622 – 1679), his sister, the artist and poet Gesina ter Borch (1631 – 1690), and his brother, the artist Harmen ter Borch (1638 - 1677). His father taught him to draw and paint. These lessons contained many features of traditional art education, with pupils typically starting with copying details from prints or drawings of famous artists, and later making copies of entire compositions while following the original as closely as possible.

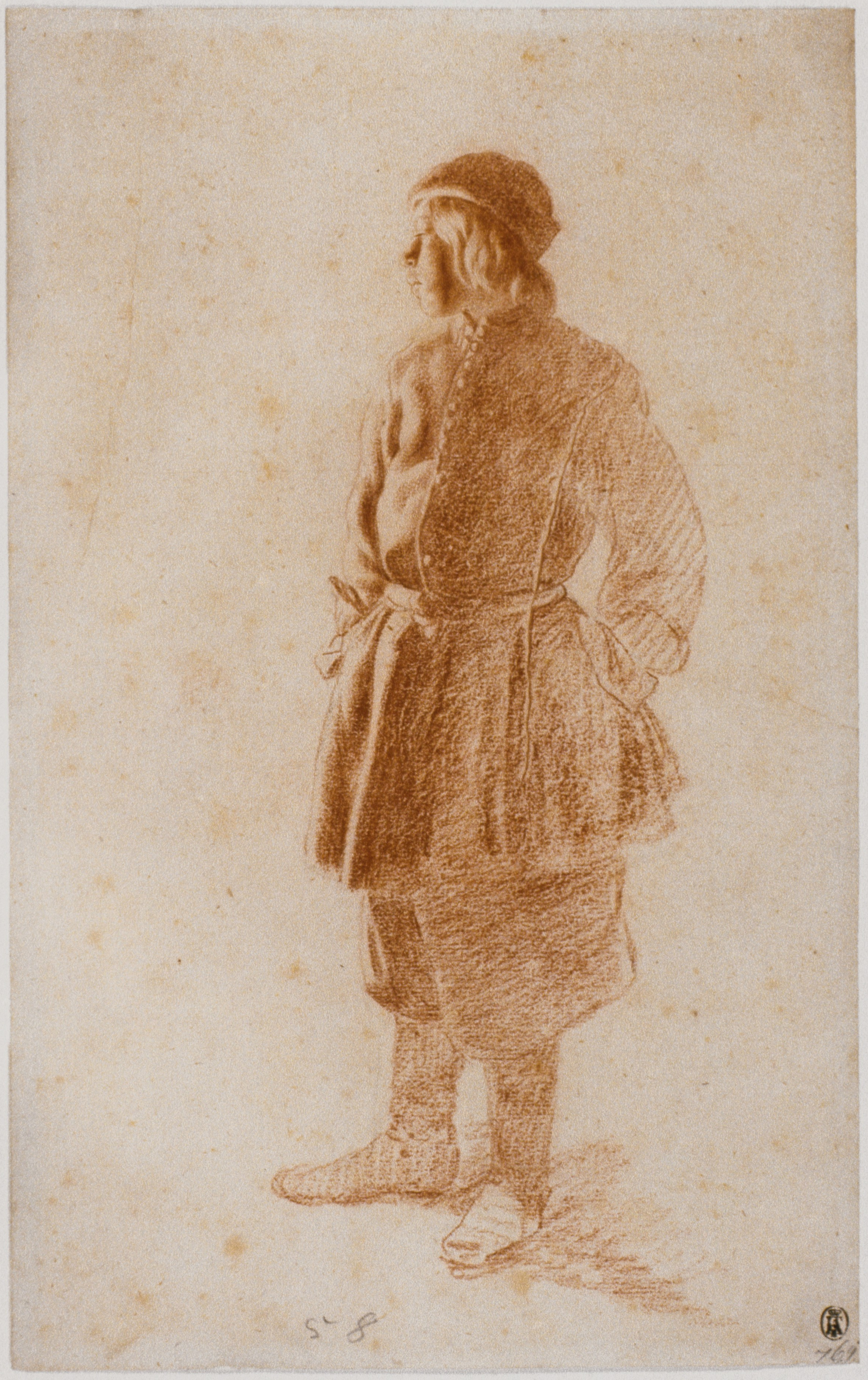
Young Man Standing with his Hands in his Pockets

Moses' sketchbook contain studies entitled 'How to build a rampart' and 'How to put together a battalion to defeat the cavalry' and a complete course in military strategy. This shows he had an increasing interest in military matters. He joined the Dutch fleet which during the Second Anglo-Dutch War sailed up the Thames to attack the English fleet. Moses was severely wounded on 2 July 1667 during the Battle of Landguard Fort. He received shots in the head and in the heart. He succumbed to his injuries 10 days later and was buried on a hill slope in Harwich. His death was a devastating blow to his close family members who kept his memory alive through their artworks and writings. His half-brother Gerard and sister Gesina collaborated on a memorial portrait of their youngest brother in which Gerard painted Moses' portrait and Gesina the background and the objects. These objects evoke Moses' heroic death and the transience of life, such as time (the watch), death (the skull), eternity (ivy on the rocks) and loyalty (the dogs).

== Work ==
Moses left a limited oeuvre as he died at a very young ago. Only a few paintings by his hand - all portraits - are known.

He showed a great talent in drawing. He drew a large number of self-portraits that bear a striking resemblance to Rembrandt's striking studies in physiognomy and human expression. Inspired by Rembrandt's self-portraits, he explored his own face in these studies by depicting himself with different expressions. In these portrait studies he was able to express various emotions and expressions ranging from cheerful, to surly and conceited to angry. He also portrayed his close family members in a tender manner. In the early 1660s he made a series of penetrating, individualised studies of boys and men in military dress. About 20 figure studies from this series are known today. These drawings are made in red or black chalk and depict single figures, who appear mostly to be young seamen who were likely his shipmates.

== Gallery ==
Selected works

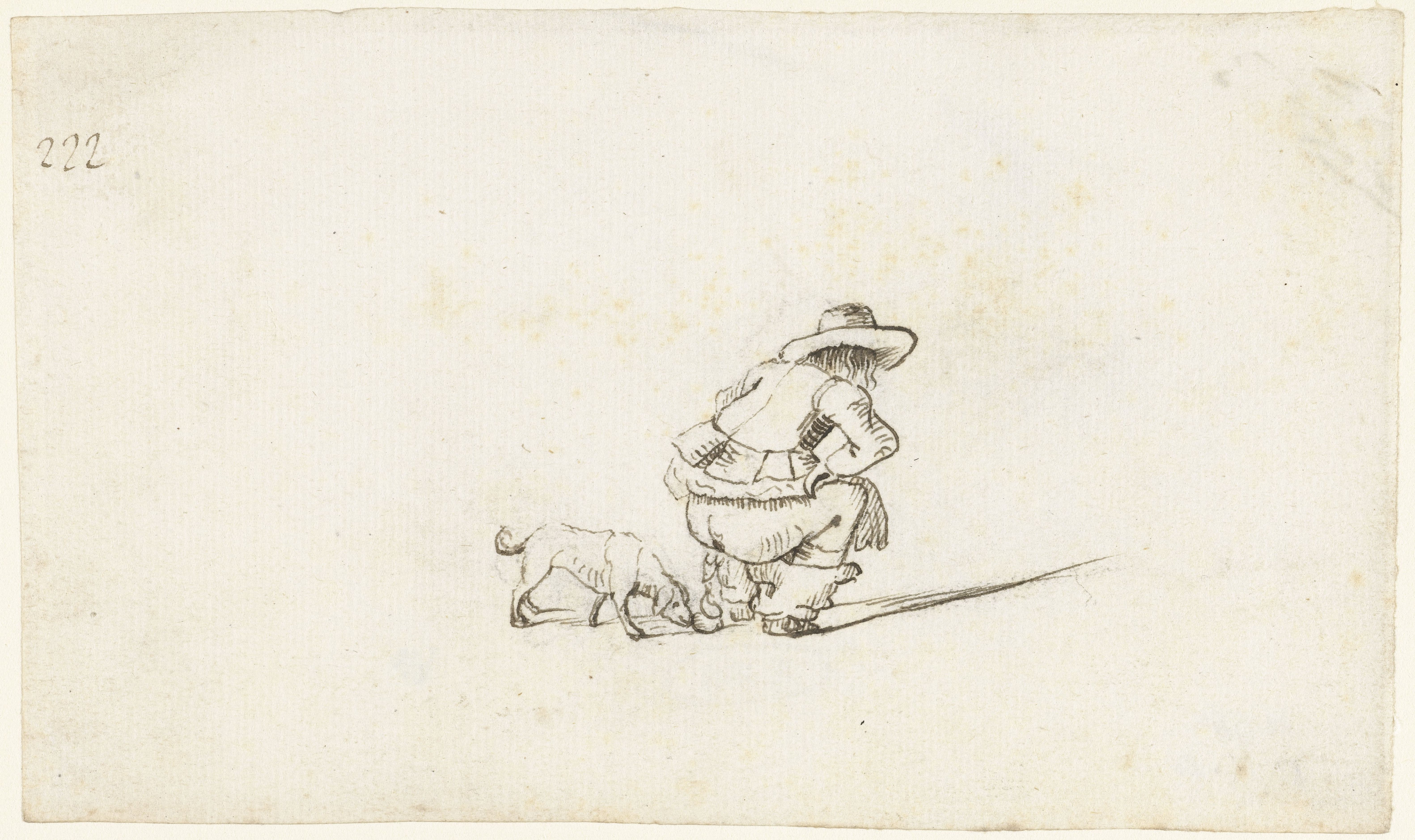
Boy squatting to relieve himself next to a dog, c. 1656

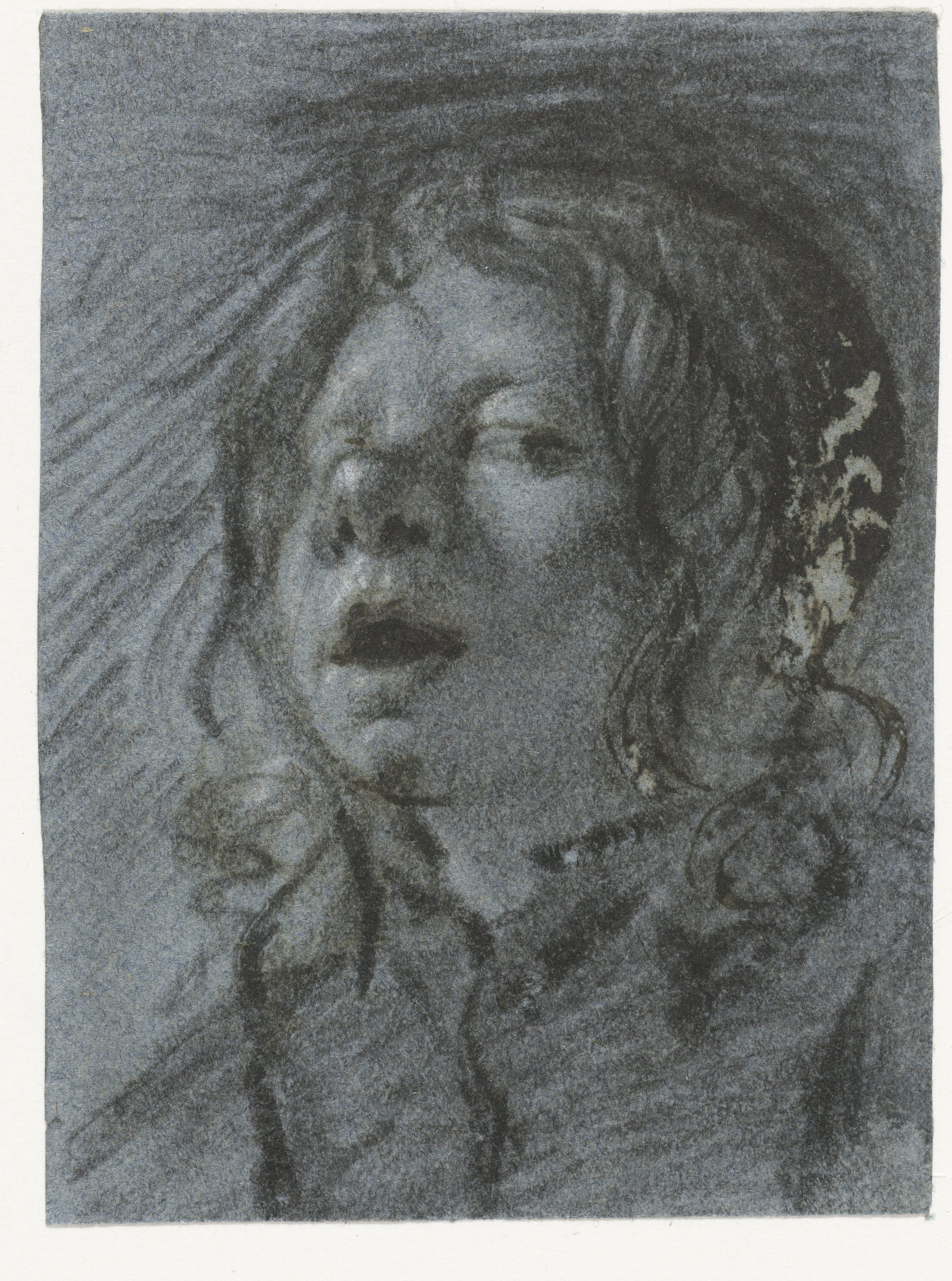
Self-portrait with open mouth, ca. 1660

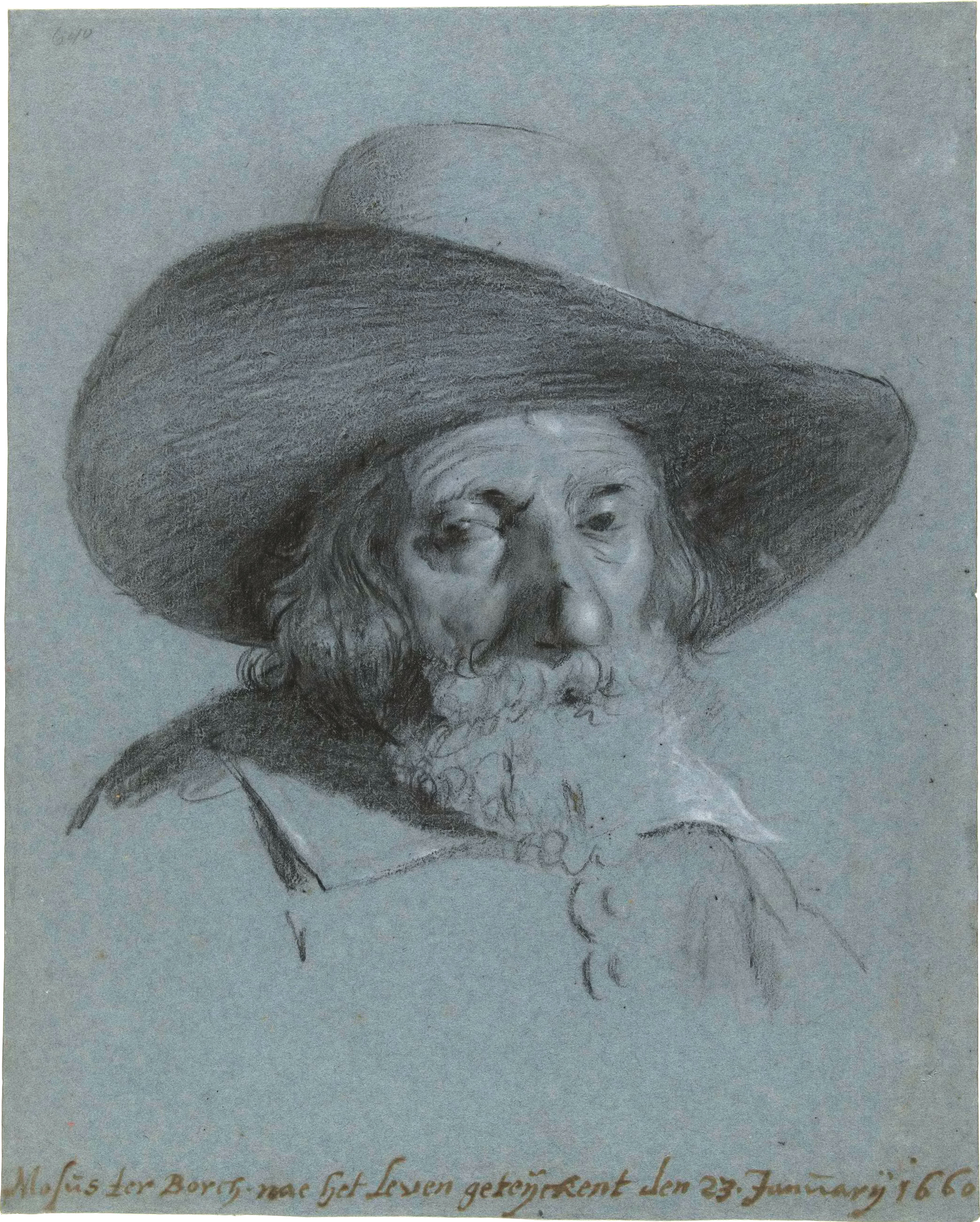
Portrait of Gerard ter Borch the Elder (the artist's father), 1660

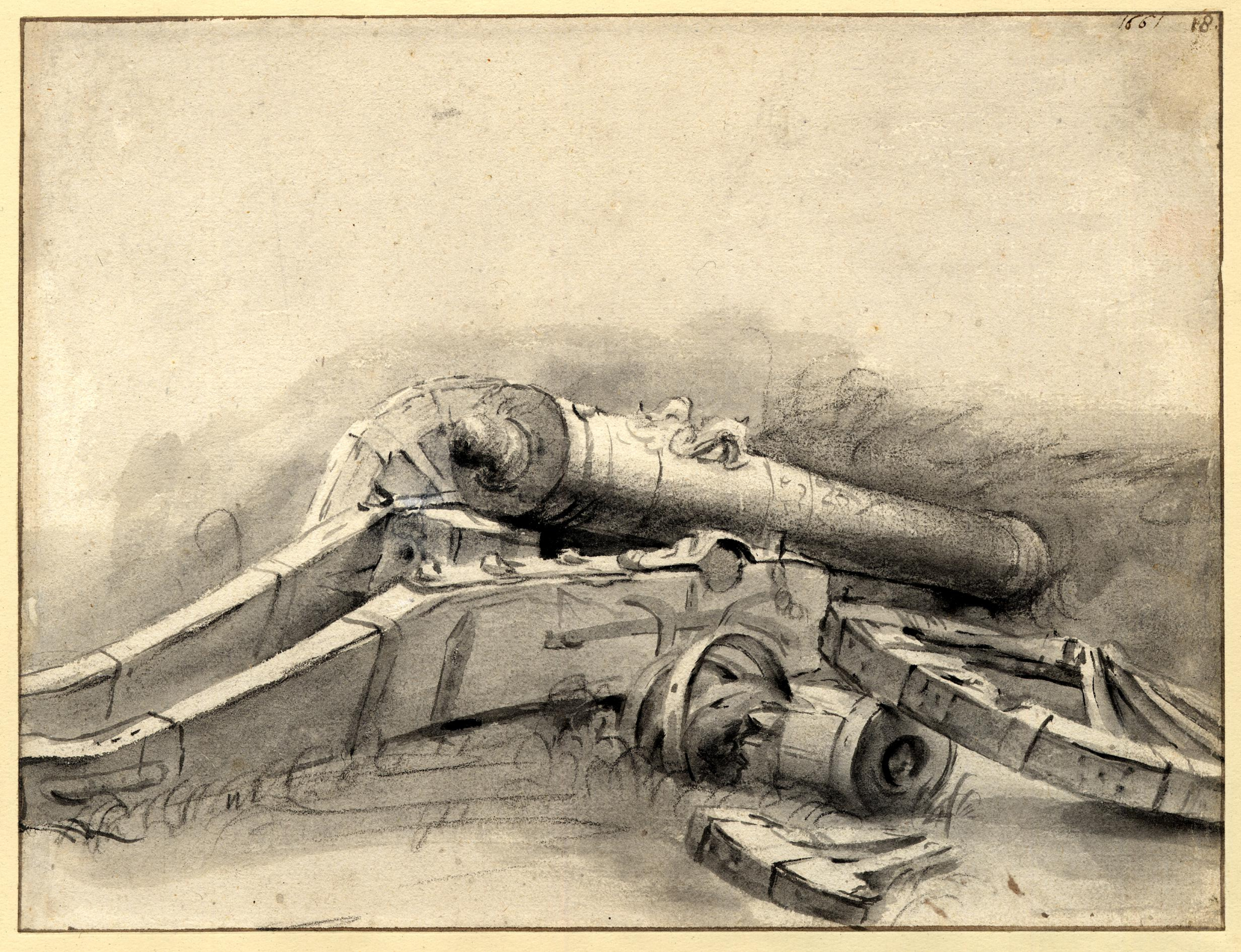
Study of a wrecked field-gun, 1661
