= The Letters of Sacco and Vanzetti =

1928 collection of letters by Nicola Sacco and Bartolomeo Vanzetti

- Title page for The Letters of Sacco and Vanzetti (1928)
- Author: Nicola Sacco and Bartolomeo Vanzetti
- Subject: Letter collection
- Publisher: The Viking Press
- Publication date: 1928
- Pages: 414

The Letters of Sacco and Vanzetti is a 1928 collection of letters written by Nicola Sacco and Bartolomeo Vanzetti.

== Contents ==
Their correspondence addresses famous figures including H. G. Wells and Theodore Dreiser. An appendix aggregates events during the case, their courtroom speeches, and Vanzetti's final statement.

== Publication ==
Marion Frankfurter co-edited the book while her husband, Felix Frankfurter, who would become a United States Supreme Court justice, taught at Harvard. He had written in support of Sacco and Vanzetti. Gardner Jackson, giving departing Massachusetts Governor Alvan T. Fuller an inscribed copy in January 1929, instead saw the governor knock the book to the ground upon seeing its title.

Constable released the book in the United Kingdom on March 21, 1929.

Vanguard Press, in a different edition, reprinted the letters in 1930 on the third anniversary of Sacco and Vanzetti's deaths. The New York Herald Tribune book editor considered the letters "great literature among the most moving letters ever written" to be remembered even after fiction of the era fades. He found their poetry skilled even with their limited command of the English language.

== Bibliography ==
- Deutsch, Babette (December 9, 1928). "Dead Men and Living Truth". New York Herald Tribune (1926-1962). New York, N.Y., France. p. J2. ProQuest 1113512434.
- Hapgood, Norman (1929). "Review of The Letters of Sacco and Vanzetti". American Bar Association Journal. 15 (5): 300–301. ISSN 0002-7596. JSTOR 25707655.
- Linscott, R. N. (March 1929). "The Letters of Sacco and Vanzetti (1928)". The Bookman. pp. 106–107.
- Read, Herbert (July 1, 1929). "Rev. of The Letters of Sacco and Vanzetti". The Criterion. 8 (33): 752. ProQuest 1293594010.
- "Rev. of The Letters of Sacco and Vanzetti". The American Mercury. March 1929.
- "Rev. of The Letters of Sacco and Vanzetti". The Dial. 86: 439. 1929. ProQuest 1296405855.
- "Review of The Letters of Sacco and Vanzetti". Journal of the American Institute of Criminal Law and Criminology. 20 (1): 160. 1929. doi:10.2307/1134749. ISSN 0885-4173. JSTOR 1134749.
- Robbins, Frances Lamont (January 2, 1929). "The Letters of Sacco and Vanzetti (1928)". The Outlook. p. 28.
- Rorty, James (December 5, 1928). "The Letters of Sacco and Vanzetti (1928)". The Nation. p. 618.
- Scudder, Vida D. (February 1929). "The Letters of Sacco and Vanzetti". The Atlantic Monthly. p. 18. ISSN 0160-6514. ProQuest 203560612.
- Shanks, Edward (March 30, 1929). "An American Tragedy (Rev. of The Letters of Sacco and Vanzetti)". The Saturday Review of Politics, Literature, Science and Art. 147 (3831): 43A–436. ISSN 0950-9852. ProQuest 9578822.
