= John Letters =

Scottish golf club manufacturer

John Letters was a Scottish golf club manufacturer. It began as Letters Logan & Company in Glasgow in 1918. The company was rescued from bankruptcy in 2005 and continued under new ownership and the John Letters name. The company is known for its Golden Goose putter which was launched by the company in 1946. John Letters Trilogy Range boosted company revenues but cheaper Far East imports left them unable to compete. In the 1949 Ryder Cup tournament, eight of the ten British team players used John Letters clubs. Notable players who have used John Letters clubs include: Fred Daly, Bernard Gallacher, Dai Rees, Lee Trevino, Cathy Panton, Sam Torrance, Gary Player and Paul Lawrie.
