= Maktubat =

Maktubat, Mektubat (Arabic: مکتوبات) or Makatib, Mekatib (Persian: مکاتیب), commonly translated as The Letters may refer to the following works:

- Makatib (Maktubat al-Rabbani), the book containing Ahmad Sirhindi's letters to his disciples, family members, and men of state and of influence
- Maktubat, a collection of Ahmad Sirhindi letters to Mughal rulers and other contemporaries
- Maktubat, by Esat Erbili
- Mektubat-ı Sırrı Paşa, by Giritli Sırrı Paşa
- Mektubat, a book from Risale-i Nur collection by Said Nursi

== See also ==
- Maktub (disambiguation)
