= Gesina ter Borch =

Dutch artist (1631–1690)

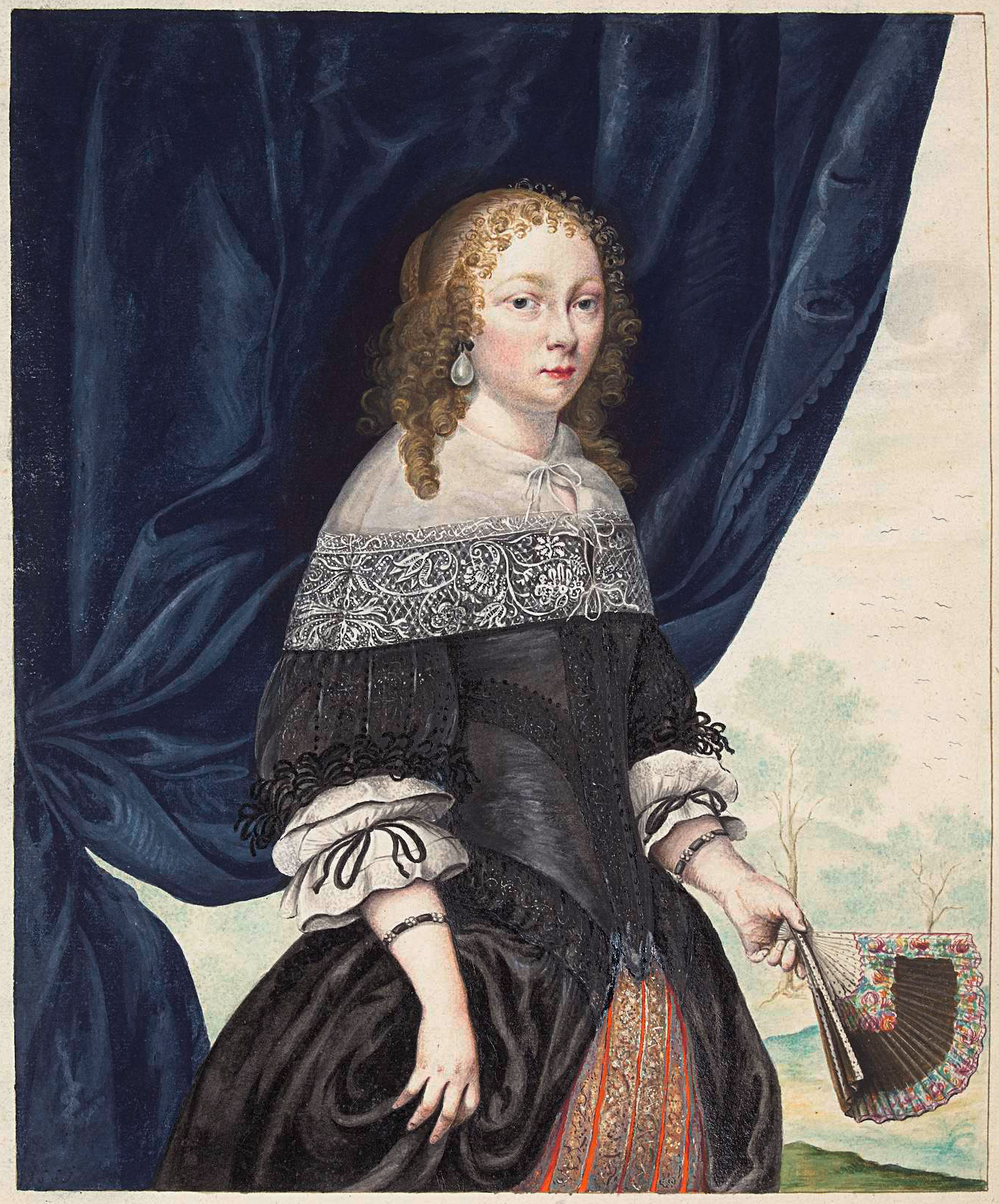
- Self portrait, 1661
- Born: 15 November 1631; Deventer, Dutch Republic
- Died: 16 April 1690 (aged 58); Zwolle, Dutch Republic
- Known for: Painting
- Movement: Dutch Golden Age, Baroque

Gesina ter Borch (Deventer 15 November 1631 – Zwolle 16 April 1690) was a Dutch Golden Age watercolorist and draftswoman, whose work mostly consists of watercolor paintings in albums. Most of her work captured her observations of family life, current events, and fashionable people. In addition to working in the visual arts, she wrote love poetry.

== Early life and education ==
Gesina ter Borch was born on 15 November 1631 in Deventer in the Dutch Republic, and baptised as 'Geesien'. She was the first child of the third marriage of Gerard ter Borch the Elder, who taught her to draw and paint. Her father was a draftsman and artist, but became a customs collector of commercial trade with the title of license master, working on the border between the Holy Roman Empire and the Dutch Republic. He trained her older and younger brothers more formally but Gesina was well educated for a woman of her time and class, learning to read, write and study the art of calligraphy (seen as suitable endeavours for well-born women). She also studied music and learned to draw. Her half-brother Gerard ter Borch II enjoyed artistic success and corresponded with Gesina frequently. After the loss of her younger brother, Moses, in the Battle of Landguard Fort, part of the Second Anglo-Dutch War (1665-1667), Gesina's work conveyed her deep sadness.

== Career ==
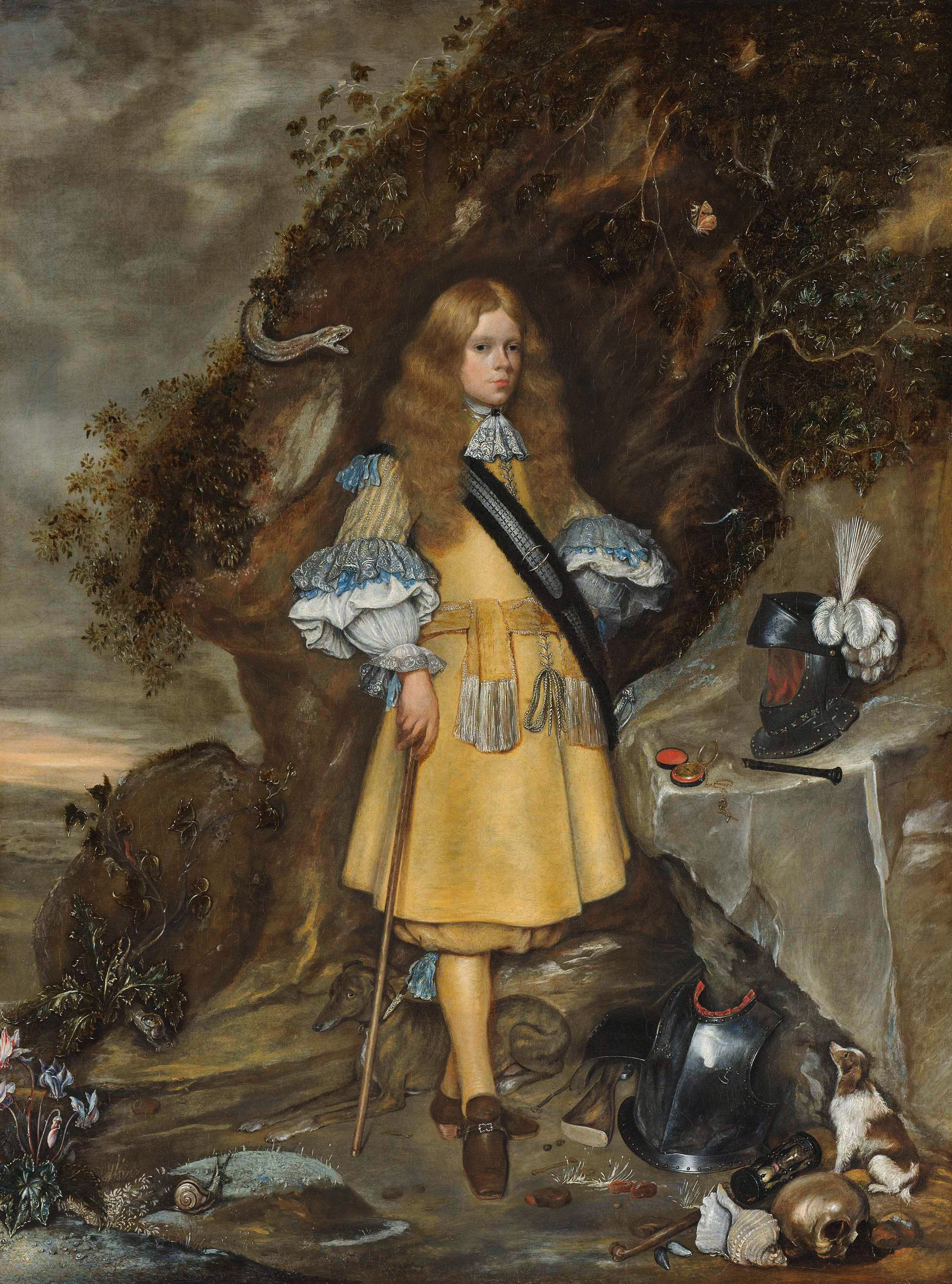
Posthumous portrait of her younger brother Moses, painted by Gesina in collaboration with her half-brother, Gerard, ca. 1667–1669. The painting was in memory of Moses' promising work as an artist following his death after entering the Navy where he fought in the Second English Civil War on the English coast.

Gesina ter Borch was successful during her artistic career, although given her relatively high social class, she did not have to work as an artist for a living. Her earliest dated piece is from 1648, when she was 17 years old.

She also collaborated with her older half-brother Gerard in a few of his pieces. Gesina was a model for many of the ladies that are depicted in Gerard's works Ladies in Satin. Gerard considered Gesina his favorite model for these works. Gesina became a successful watercolorist. During her lifetime, she collected love poetry, and she made illustrations to coincide with it as well. Some albums of her work even included pieces dedicated to songs about love.

== Personal life ==
Ter Borch lived her entire life on the Sassenstraat in Zwolle, where she died on 16 April 1690. In 1660, she became friends with Henrik Jordis, a merchant from Amsterdam and an amateur poet. This resulted in courtship, but she did not marry.

== Works ==
Only a few paintings by Gesina ter Borch are known, and just one of these—discovered in 2024—bears her signature. Three watercolor albums survive, as well as 59 loose sheets of drawings. As she was an amateur rather than a professional artist, her work was not widely known during her lifetime. Between ages 14 and 15, Gesina began her first album of illustrated poetry and calligraphy of moralizing verses, the Materi-boeck, signed with the diminutive form of her name, 'Geesken ter Borch'. Between 1652 and 1660, she produced a second album with 116 sheets containing songs, poems, and illustrations.

== Legacy ==
In 1882 art historian Abraham Bredius rediscovered the family’s albums compiled by Gesina, and they were acquired by the Rijksmuseum. For well over a century the albums were used as a source of information about her more famous brother Gerhard, until the art historians Alison Kettering and Hans Luijten began to study them to learn about Gesina herself. Gesina acted as archivist and curator of the family's collections, and took care in placing objects and papers after her death. She also appeared as a model for her brother's genre paintings.

In March of 2021 Ter Borch's work was added to the "Gallery of Honor" at the Rijksmuseum. Ter Borch, Judith Leyster, and Rachel Ruysch were the first women artists to be included in the gallery.

In 2023, an antique dealer bought a portrait of a toddler he initially thought was a likeness of Prince William III but which on further investigation was discovered to be the only known signed painting by Gesina ter Borch. It was acquired by the Rijksmuseum for over 3 million euros.

== Gallery ==
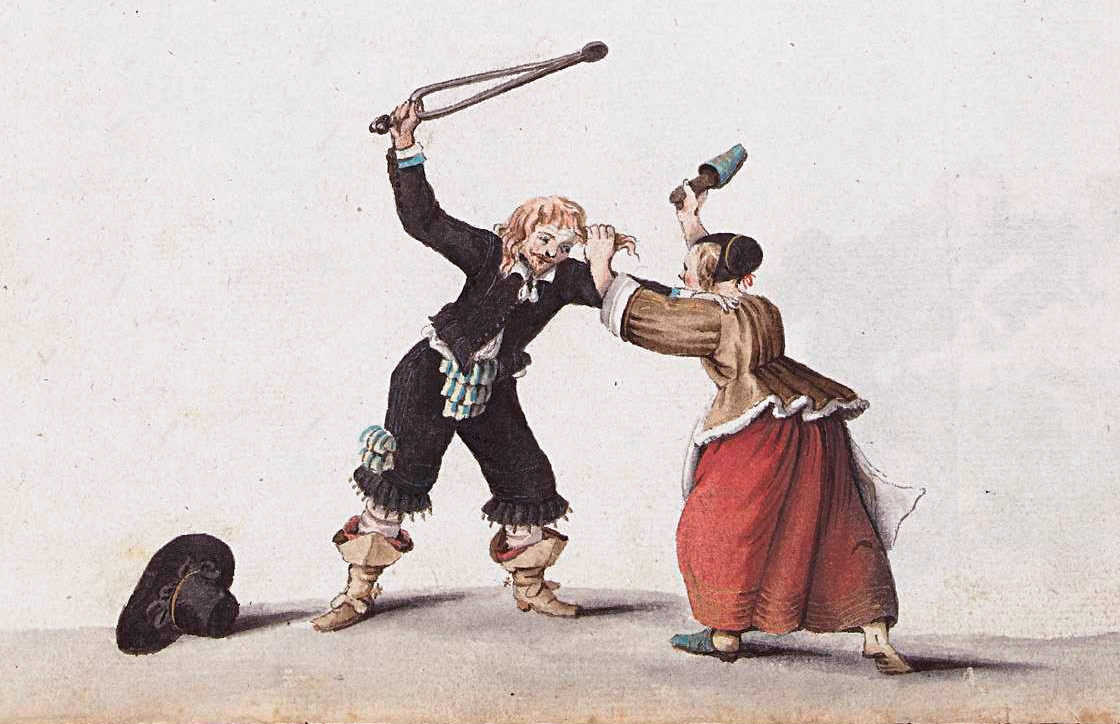
Domestic Argument, 1670. Stedelijk Museum, Amsterdam.

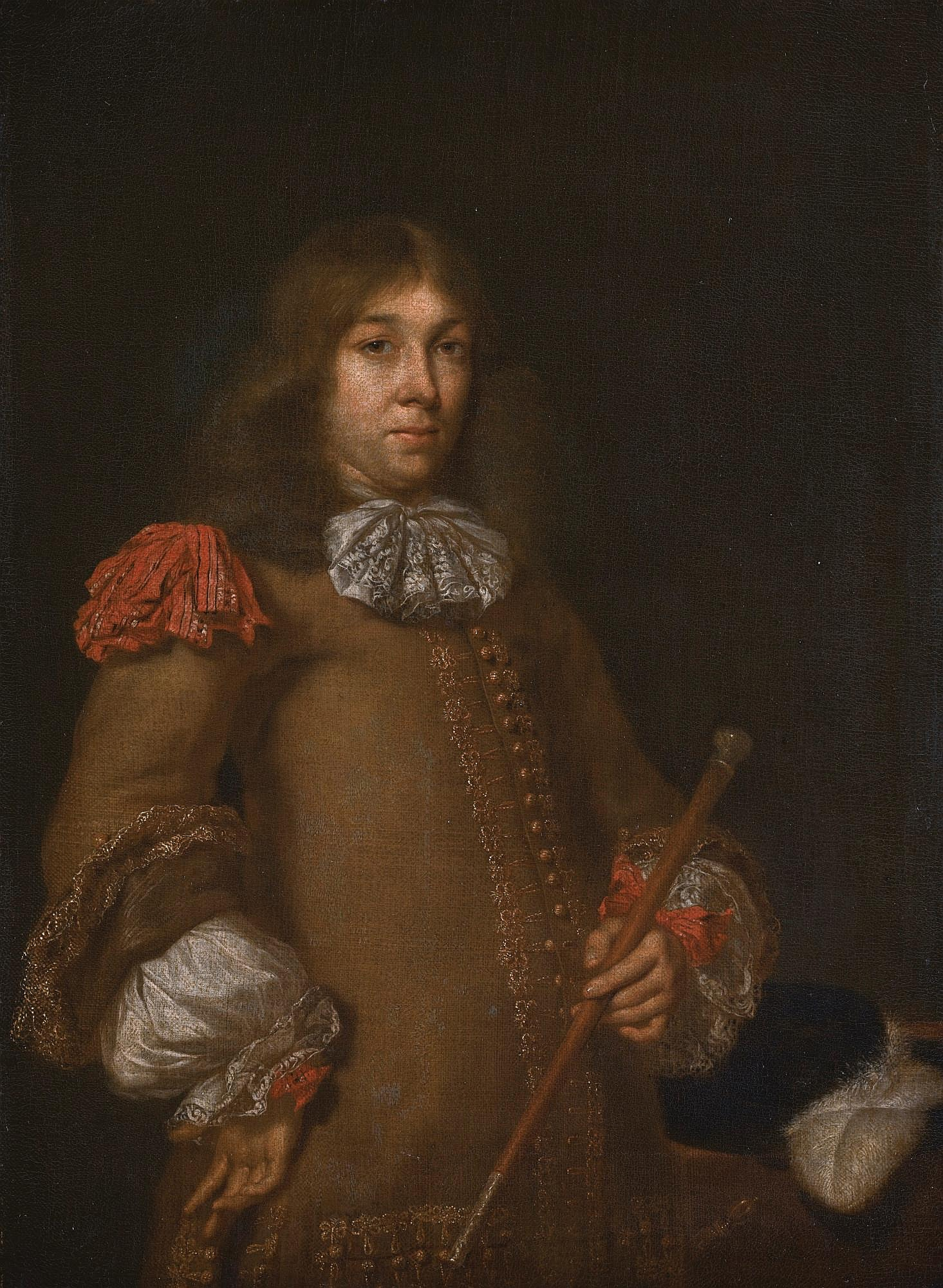
Portrait of Cornelis Andriesz de Graeff. Mauritshuis, 1673, The Hague.

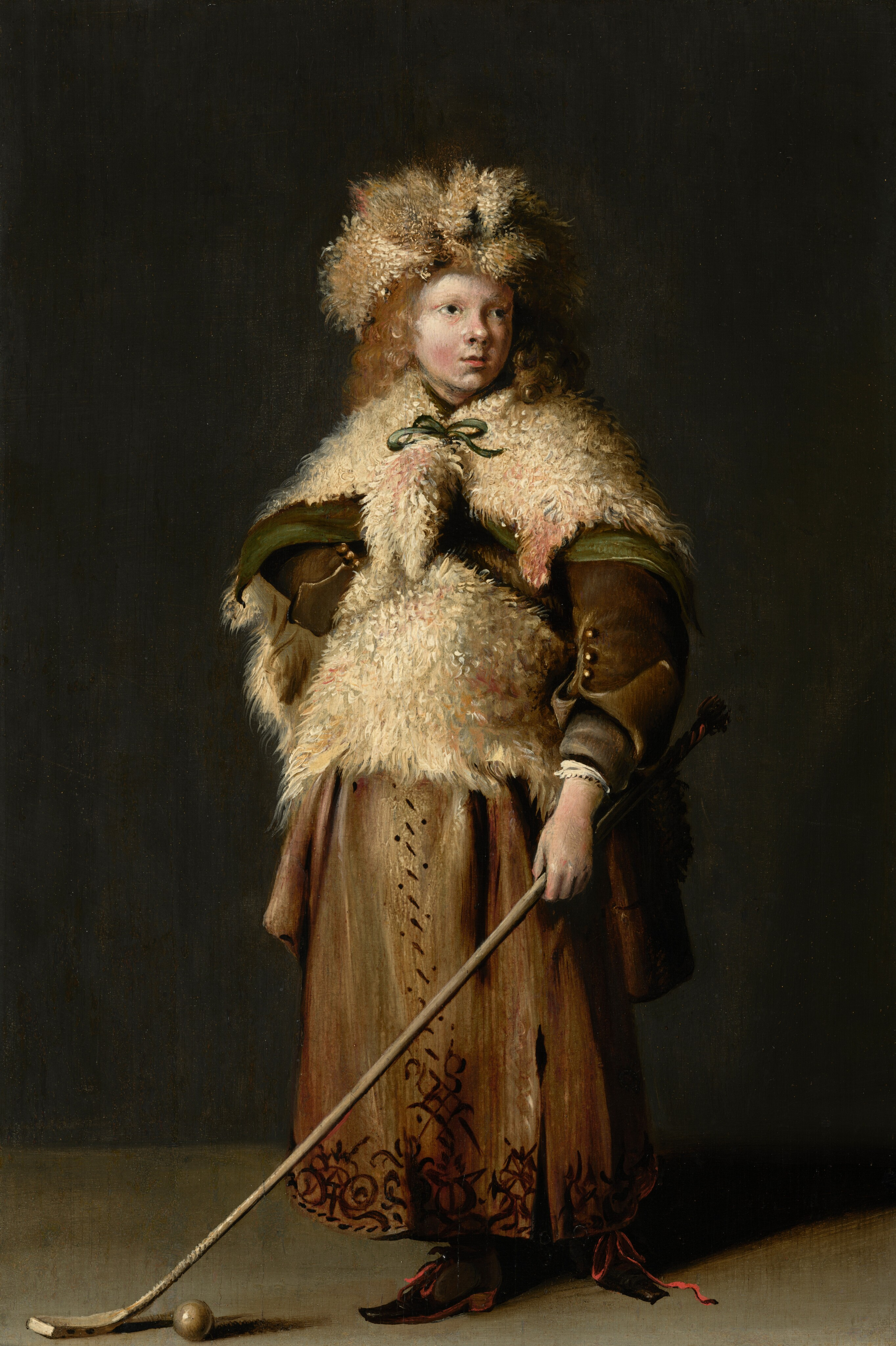
Moses ter Borch Holding a Kolf Stick, c. 1655, National Gallery of Art, Washington
