= The Letters (novel) =

2008 romantic novel

The Letters is a novel by American writers Luanne Rice and Joseph Monninger. The novel was first printed in September 2008 in hardcover by Bantam Dell, a division of Random House, Inc. The Letters is a fiction, romantic novel.

The Letters tells a story of Sam and Hadley West who write each other a series of highly emotional letters during the course of their separation. The letters outline the course of their relationship before and after the death of their son in an airplane crash.

== Plot summary ==
While Sam and Hadley are thousands of miles apart, waiting for their divorce to come through, they begin to exchange letters. The letters start out with Sam and Hadley West trying to come to terms with the death of their only child and son Paul. Sam believes that going to Alaska and taking the dangerous trek by plane and dog sled to see the place where Paul died will help him come to terms with his son's death. Hadley rents a cottage, haunted by the previous owner, off the coast of Maine in a town called Monhegan. Hadley chose Monhegan because she felt like she needed to get away and she liked the idea that it was an artist's colony in the summer. Hadley came to Monhegan in October, so all the artist's were already leaving. Hadley liked the desolation of the island because she could be left alone to grieve in solitude. While in Monhegan she began to paint again. The letters consist of the feelings and worry that they were unable to say during their marriage. The letters allow the West's to reconnect and become the family that would have been if their son had lived. As Sam is on his journey to the crash site he experiences many dangers and is constantly risking his life. Sam's wife Hadley is on a journey of the soul to rid her of the grief she carries from the death of her only child.

== Main characters ==
=== Sam West ===
Sam West is married to Hadley West and father of Paul West. Sam goes to Alaska to try and come to terms with the death of his son. Sam at first took jobs faraway, so that he would not have to deal with his son's death and his wife's grief. Sam decides to take a trip to Alaska so that he can see where his son died. As Sam takes this trip he is also trying to save his marriage. Sam begins writing letters to Hadley in hopes that she can see why he took the trip.

=== Hadley West ===
Hadley West is married to Sam West and mother of Paul West. Hadley broke down after Paul's death. She started drinking heavily and having an affair. Hadley realizes her destructive ways after she is caught by Sam. Hadley rents a cottage of the coast of Maine, so that she can come to terms with Paul's death. Hadley starts to paint again while at the cottage and finds inspirations for her to stay sober.
