= Martha Dana Mercer =

Martha Mercer, née Dana
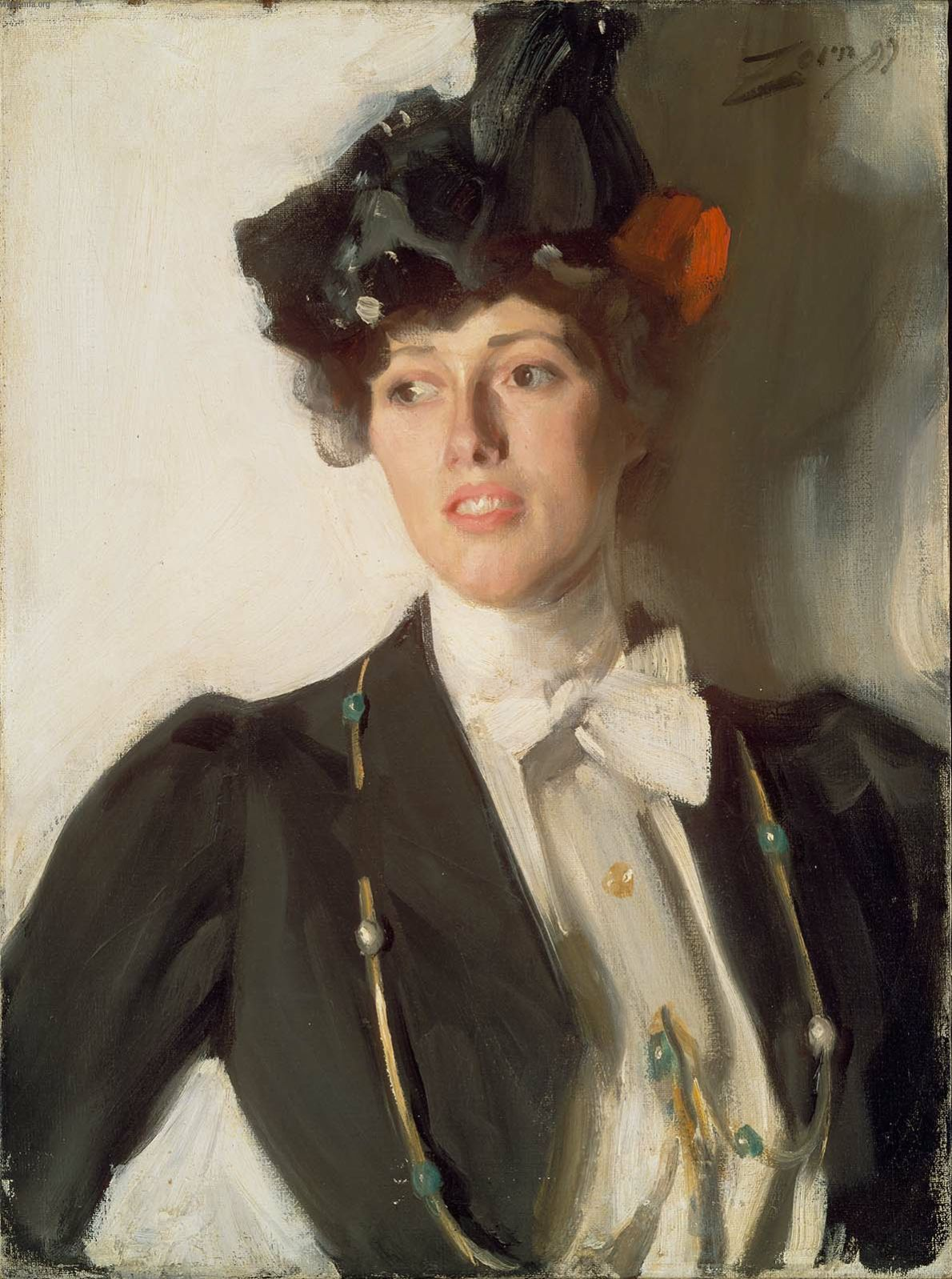
- Portrait by Anders Zorn
- Born: May 21, 1872
- Died: February 21, 1960 (aged 87); Doylestown, Pennsylvania

Martha Mercer, née Dana (1872–1960) was a US art collector and philanthropist.

She was the daughter of Charles Stratton Dana of the Dana family of Boston. She became friends with Isabella Stewart Gardner who arranged for her to have her portrait painted by Anders Zorn in 1899.

She married the artist William Robert Mercer of Doylestown, Pennsylvania, who was the brother of Henry Chapman Mercer. Together they designed and built Aldie Mansion in the Tudor revival style, today owned by the Heritage Conservancy of Bucks County. The couple had twins in 1910 who died within a year. Her husband died in 1939 and Martha split her legacy into three equal parts, forming the Martha Dana Mercer Trust. She gave to the Boston Symphony Orchestra, the Arnold Arboretum (in the name of her father), and the Museum of Fine Arts of Boston. Dana Mercer gave her portrait by Zorn to the museum in 1928. The museum also has another painting formerly in her collection, Man on Horseback by Gerard ter Borch.

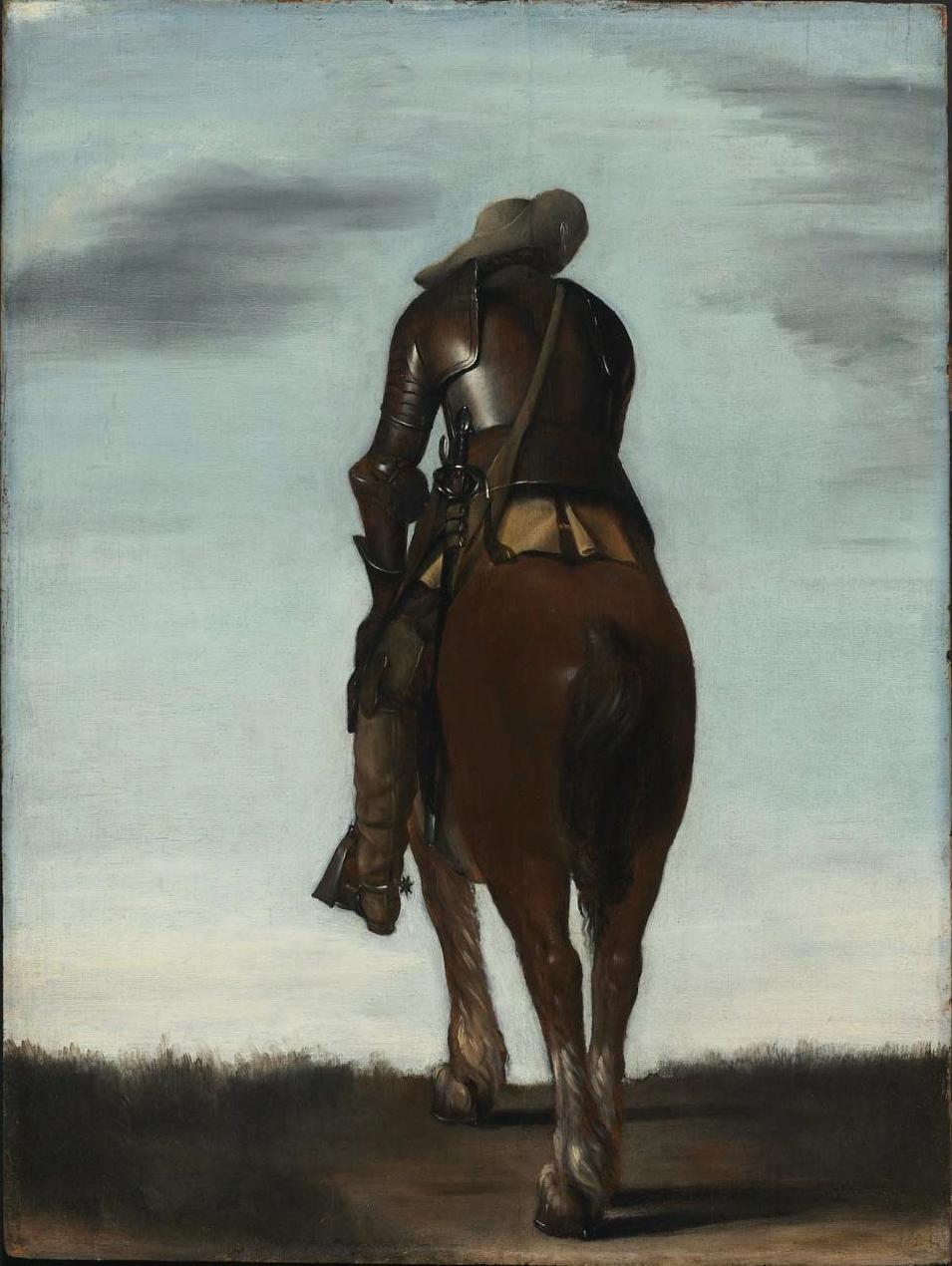
Man on Horseback, by Gerard ter Borch

Mercer is buried near her parents in Mount Auburn Cemetery.
