= A Woman Playing the Theorbo-Lute and a Cavalier =

Painting by Gerard ter Borch the Younger

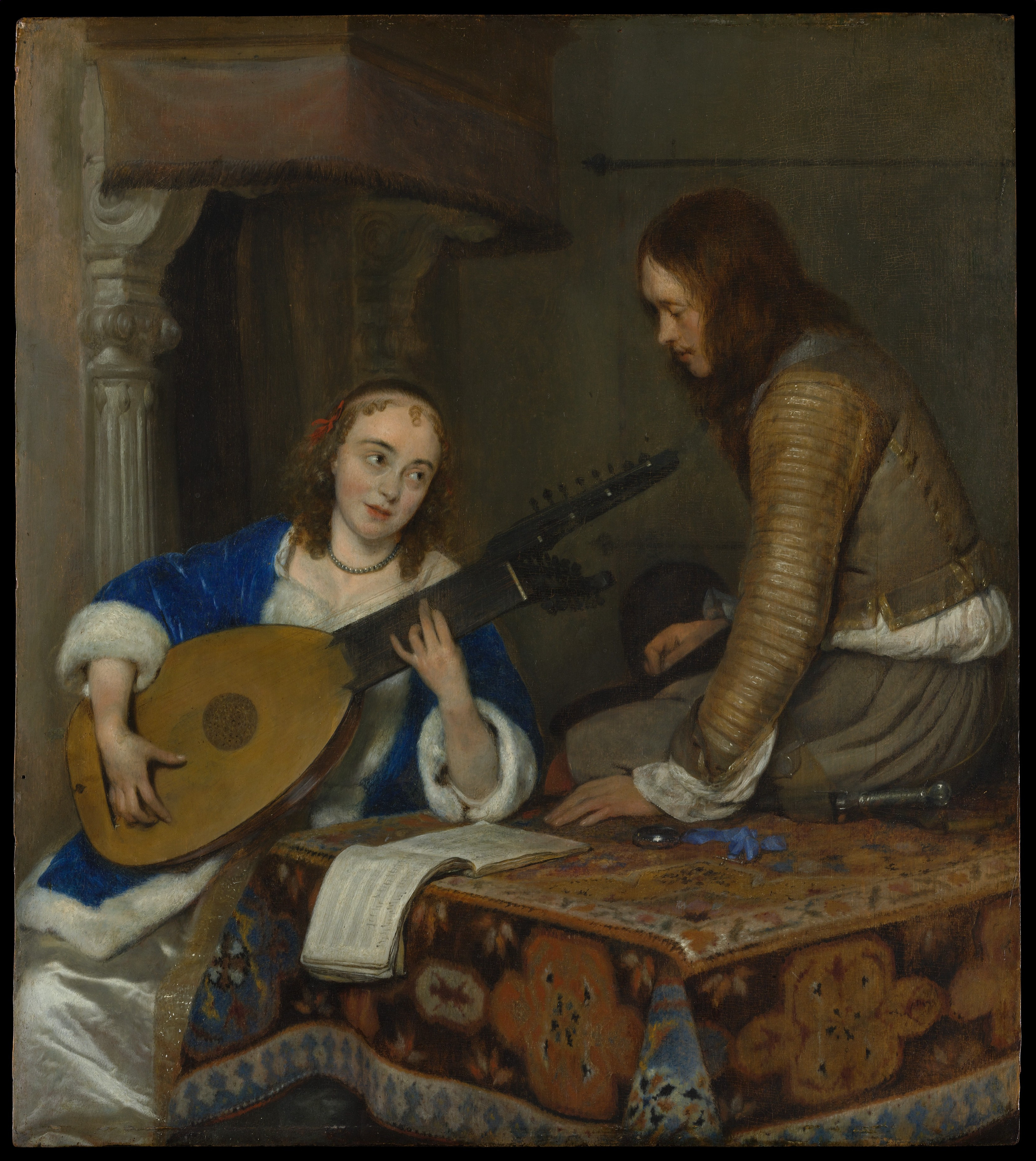
- Artist: Gerard ter Borch
- Year: c. 1658
- Medium: Oil on wood
- Dimensions: 36.8 cm × 32.4 cm (14.5 in × 12.8 in)
- Location: Metropolitan Museum of Art; New York
- Accession: 14.40.617

A Woman Playing the Theorbo-Lute and a Cavalier is an oil on wood painting by Dutch artist Gerard ter Borch the Younger, created c. 1658. The work depicts a young woman playing a theorbo while her lover looks on. The painting is in the collection of the Metropolitan Museum of Art, in New York.

== Description ==
Ter Borch's painting portrays a scene in which a young woman plays a theorbo-lute (a stringed instrument) while her suitor sits nearby. The man is a cavalier, a 17th-century soldier, and he is seen to be sitting atop a cloth-covered table. His sword is laid flat to his left, while a songbook (a common lovers' gift during the time period) rests nearby. The scene is ambiguous in nature, the young woman can be either an honest maiden or a courtesan. A pocket watch, possibly representing temperance or the fleeting nature of the affair, lies near the other objects.
