= The Gallant Conversation =

1654 painting by Gerard ter Borch (the Younger)

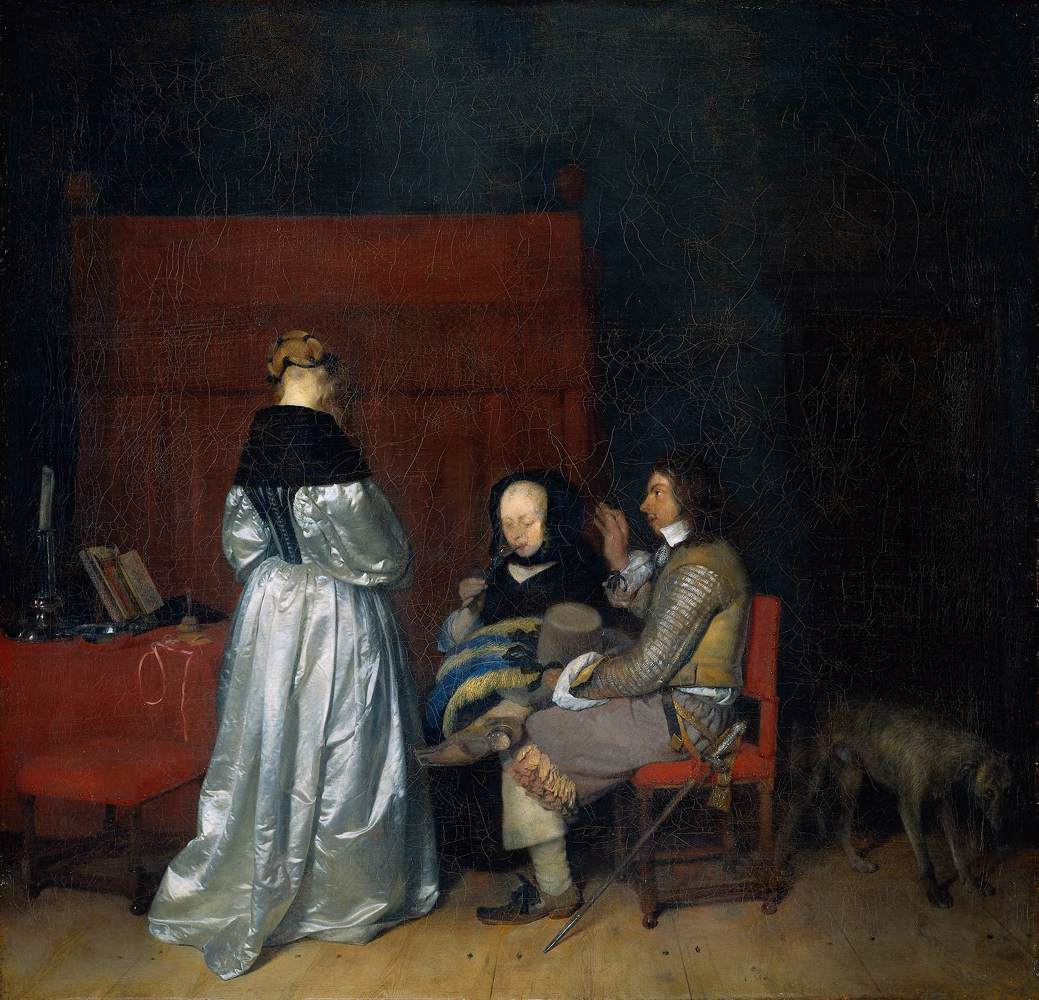
- Artist: Gerard ter Borch
- Year: c. 1654
- Medium: Oil-on-canvas
- Dimensions: 71 cm × 73 cm (28 in × 28 3/4 in)
- Location: Rijksmuseum, Amsterdam

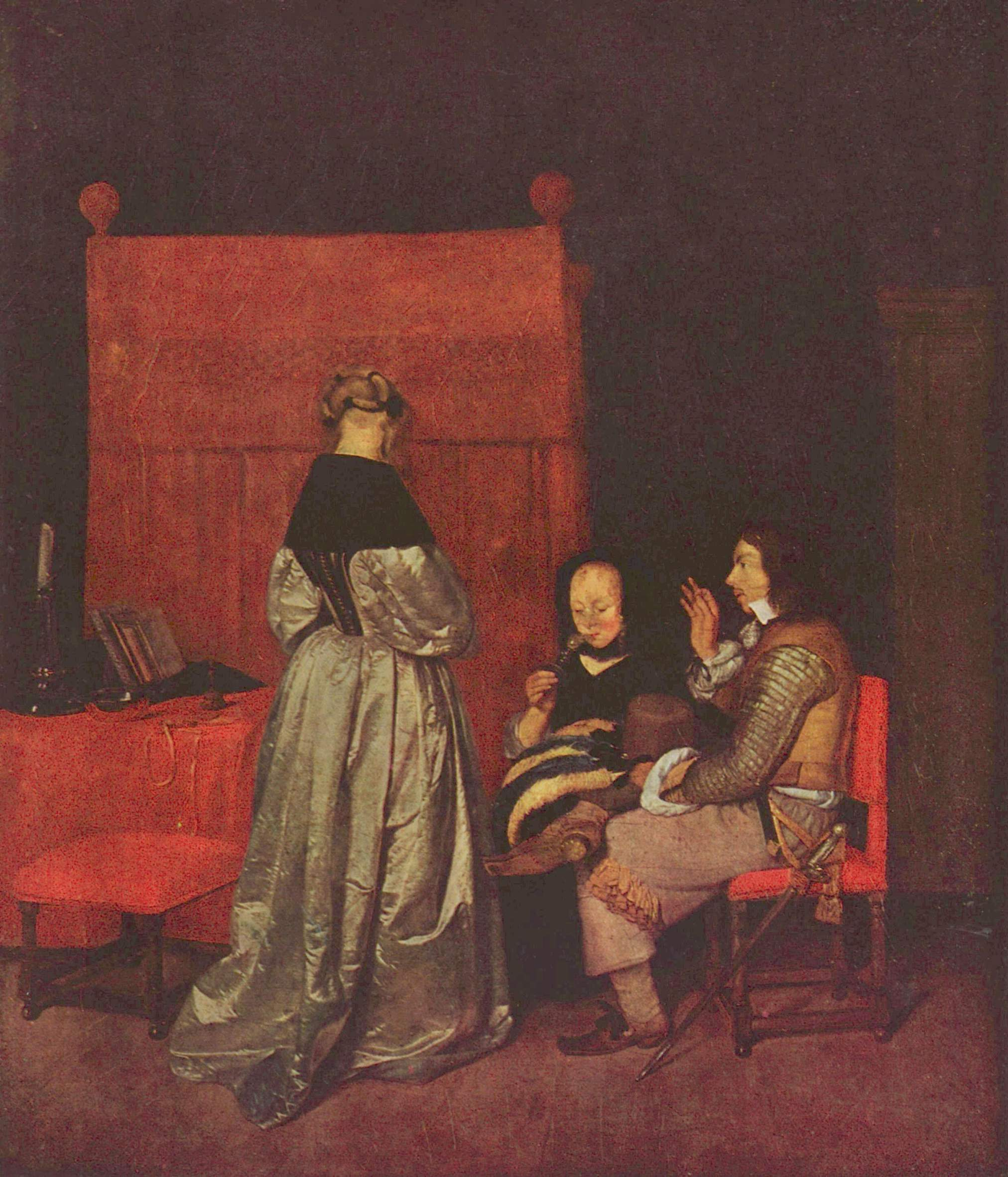
Version at the Gemäldegalerie Berlin

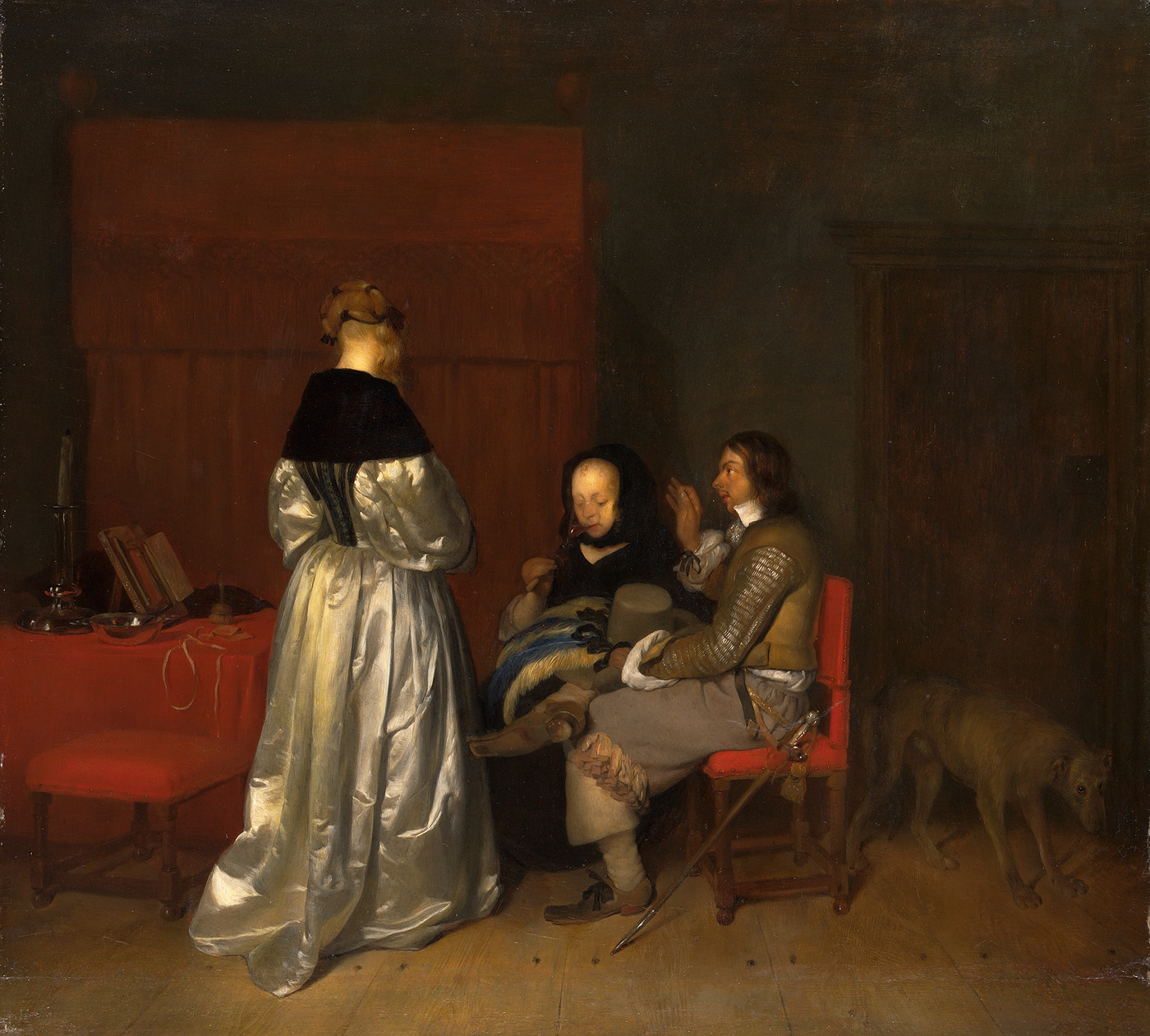
Copy by Charles Van Beveren, Amsterdam Museum

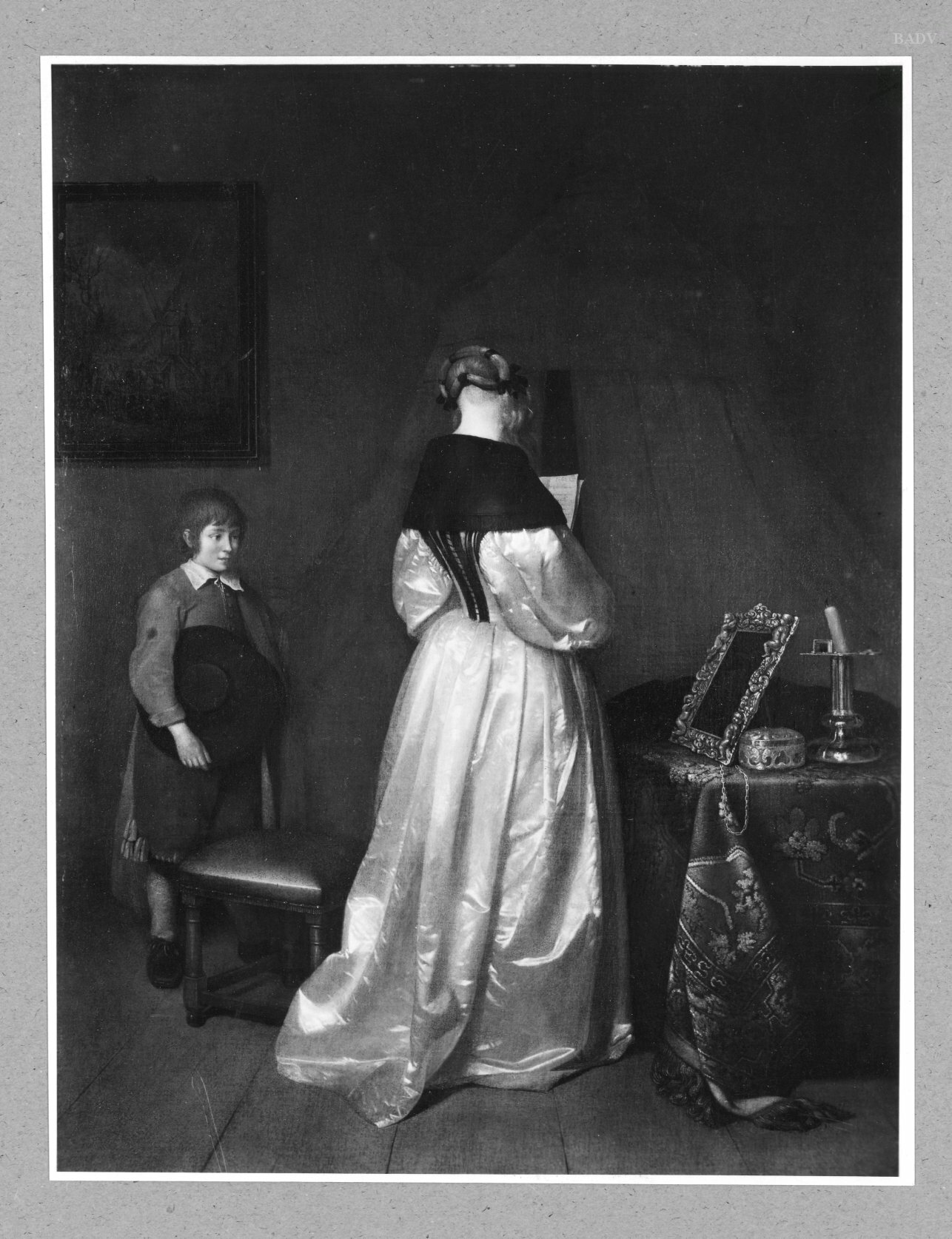
Another copy, from the workshop of Gerard ter Borch and titled Woman Reading a Letter with a Servant, probably lost in Germany during the war

The Gallant Conversation is an oil-on-canvas painting from circa 1654 by Gerard ter Borch (the Younger). A late 18th century French print of the work is titled The Paternal Admonition, apparently believing it showed a father reprimanding his daughter, but modern art historians see it as a conversation between two prospective lovers, either a discussion of a betrothal or, more likely, a customer propositioning a prostitute in a brothel. There are two versions made by the painter, one at the Rijksmuseum, in Amsterdam, and the other at the Gemäldegalerie Berlin. The two paintings are dated to around 1654. The Amsterdam version is 71 cm by 73 cm, with the extra centimeters on the right being taken up by a dog and a door. The dimensions of the Berlin painting is smaller, 70 by 60 cm.

== Description ==
The painting shows a man talking to a young woman. The woman is dressed in an exquisite silver satin gown which immediately draws the viewer's attention to her as the focus of the scene, while the man is in military dress and holds a finely decorated hat on his lap. The man appears to be addressing the young woman with a gesturing hand and slightly parted lips. The female figure seated between them and next to the man looks down and sips from a wine glass, seemingly uninterested in the ongoing conversation. To the side of the girl there is a table with a burning candle, mirror, powder puff, combs and a trailing ribbon. The setting is simply designed, but the furnishings suggest a level of feminine elegance that befits the two female figures. Behind the man's chair, a scruffy dog can be seen, and to the rear of the picture there is a large bed.

The shimmering satin dress stands out like a strong highlight against the dark earth tones of the rest of the picture and draws the viewer's attention. Ter Borch also gives evidence that the scene takes place in her boudoir - a mirror, powder puff and combs on a table to her left identify it as a woman's dressing table. The proximity of these objects to the standing woman presents the space as her domain.

Gerard ter Borch depicts the satin dress of the central figure with considerable attention to the fabric's sheen and folds. The reflective surface draws attention to the dress and contrasts with the figure's partially concealed identity, particularly as she is shown from behind. This treatment of the fabric contributes to the painting's visual emphasis on texture, light, and the figure's ambiguous presence..

== Interpretation ==
During the 19th and early 20th centuries viewers believed the scene showed the father of the girl addressing her on the subject of some misdemeanour, while her mother sat patiently beside him, sipping a glass of wine. This interpretation featured in the Goethe novel Elective Affinities

Later appraisals focused on the interaction between the man and the girl as potential lovers rather than as father and daughter. The figure formerly identified as the father, was reclassified a soldier, considered too young to be the father of the girl and the husband of the elderly woman, fitted more easily in the role of suitor. Both a formal situation, in which the man is discussing betrothal to the attentive girl, and a transaction in a brothel have been suggested as the subject. The details in the painting are ambiguous enough for Ter Borch to have left it to the viewer to decide which of these scenes was being portrayed.

Ter Borch made a number of copies of the work, and when a smaller version held in the Gemäldegalerie in Berlin was cleaned, it was revealed that the man was holding a coin between the fingers of his raised hand. It has been suggested that this makes the brothel scene more likely to be the correct interpretation since it is harder to reconcile the showing of money in a formal situation. However, many of the details of the painting can be placed equally well in either situation. The old woman can be viewed as either the girl's procuress or her attentive mother. The fine dress of the girl and the attention she has paid to her appearance, witnessed by the articles on the table, could be to attract a customer or equally, to secure a husband. The dog behind the chair is reminiscent of many similar depictions of domestic scenes of the time, but here it is a scruffy cur rather than a pampered spaniel.

Nevertheless, the stiff upright pose of the girl might be more suggestive of a formal setting than of the louche atmosphere of a brothel. The painting hints at the underlying sensuality, with the large bed looming over the scene, the accoutrements of female beauty on the table, and the abundant feathers in the soldier's cap, but this does not rule out a formal scene, as Ter Borch's contemporaries would have been aware of the ultimate similarities between the two situations. The appearance of the bed close by is not necessarily indicative of a brothel scene either: in the 17th century the bed would have been an expensive piece of furniture to be shown off in the best room. The room is sparsely furnished apart from the bed, chairs and table though, so there is little clue as to the location to be derived from the furniture.

== Copies ==
The picture seems to have been immediately popular, and possibly achieved wider propagation through prints. Ter Borch himself made copies, and there are at least 24 known other versions by other artists. It was also featured in Samuel van Hoogstraten's ''The Slippers'', partially visible on a wall in the background. The girl can be seen clearly (with a little boy to her left), but the rest of the scene is obscured by a door.
