= Man on Horseback (ter Borch) =

Painting by Gerard ter Borch

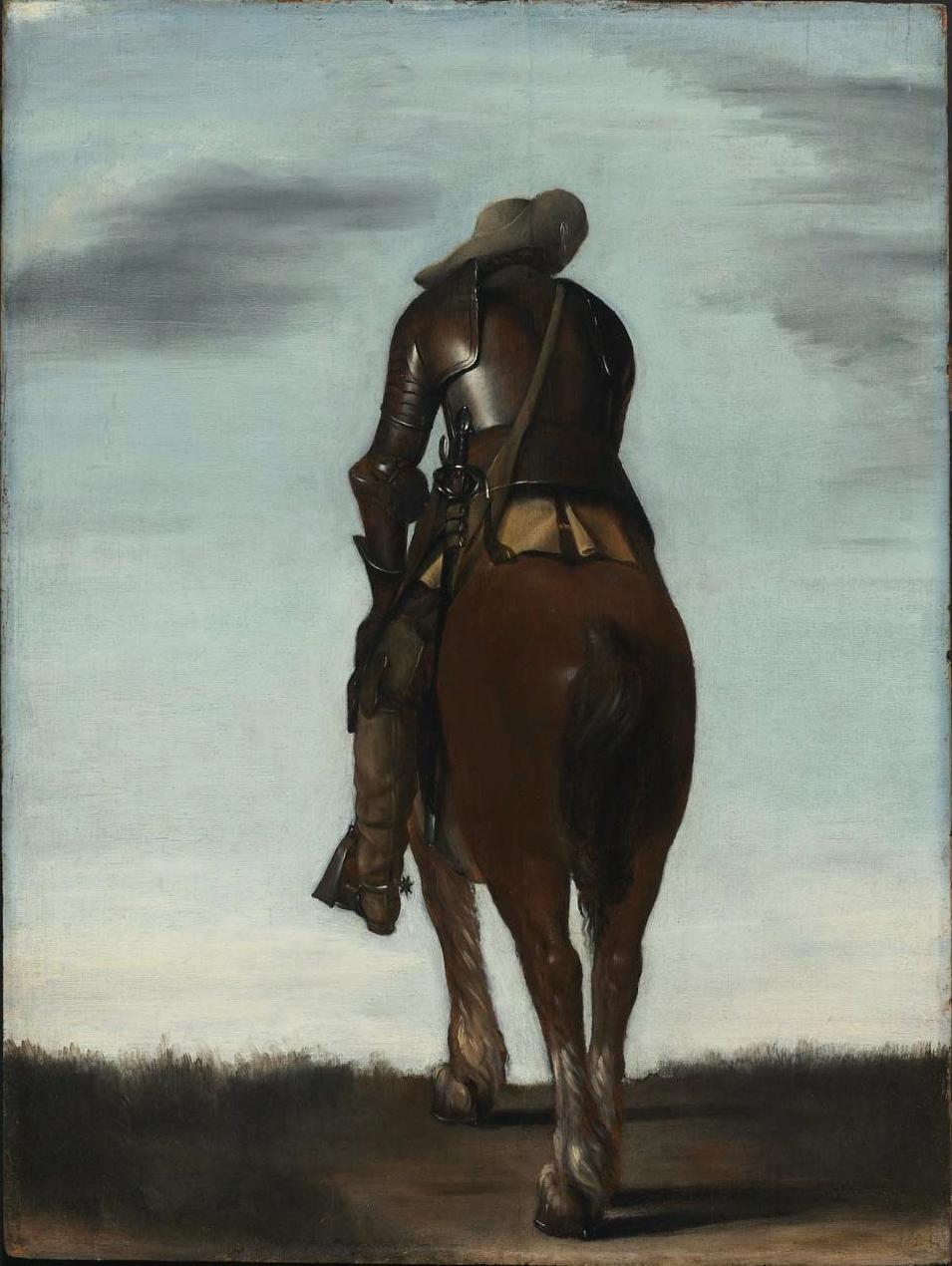
- Artist: Gerard ter Borch
- Year: 1634
- Medium: Oil paint, panel
- Dimensions: 54.9 cm (21.6 in) × 41 cm (16 in)
- Location: Museum of Fine Arts
- Accession: 61.660

Man on Horseback is a 1634 oil painting on panel by the Dutch painter Gerard ter Borch. It shows a man on horseback slumped in the saddle, moving away from the viewer. It is in the collection of the Museum of Fine Arts, Boston.

== Description ==
This painting came into the collection by a 1961 purchase. It had been sold from the estate of Martha Dana Mercer.

Two other versions by the artist from the same period are:

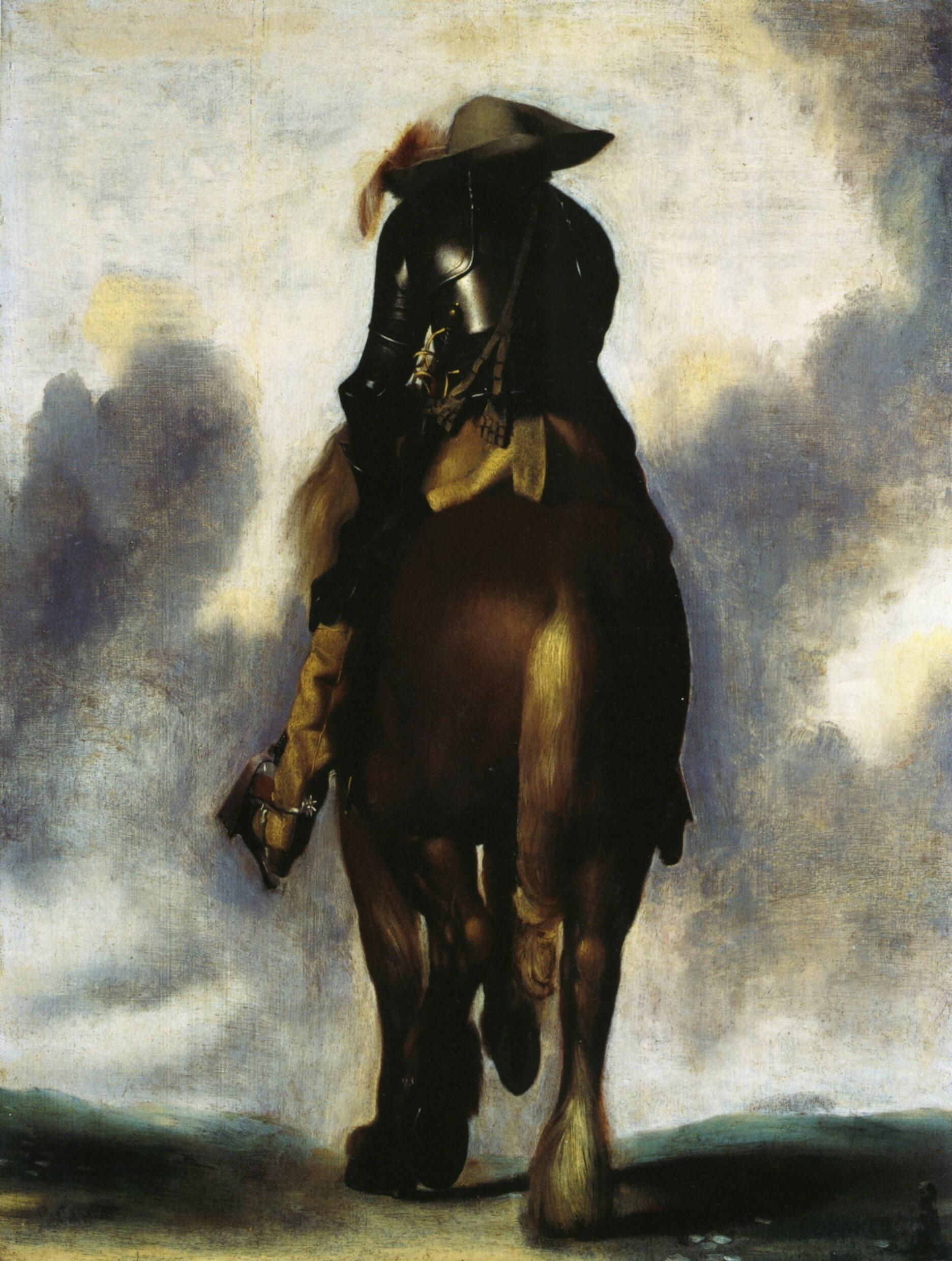
Man on Horseback Seen From Behind, c. 1634

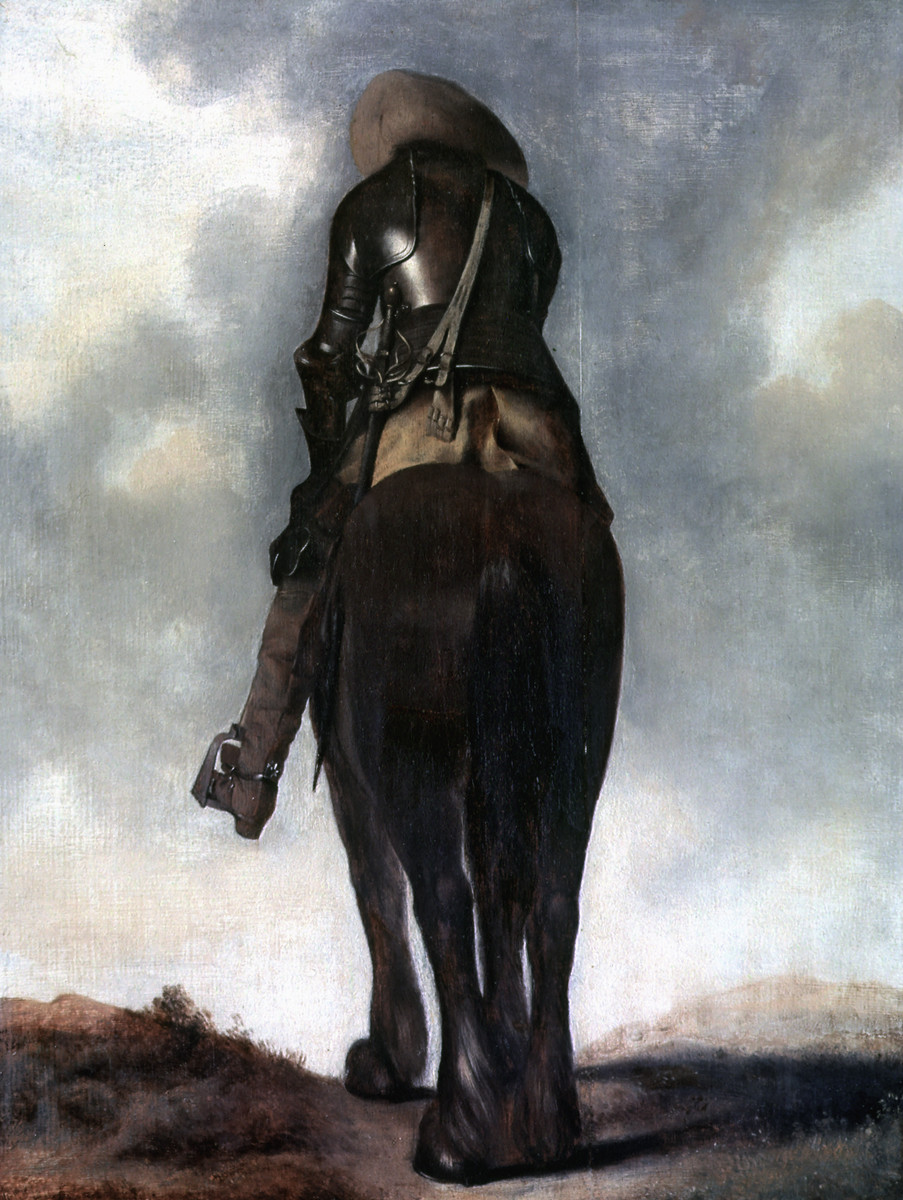
Man on Horseback Seen From Behind, c. 1634
