= Glass of Lemonade =

Painting by Gerard ter Borch

- Dutch: Het glas limonade (Dutch)
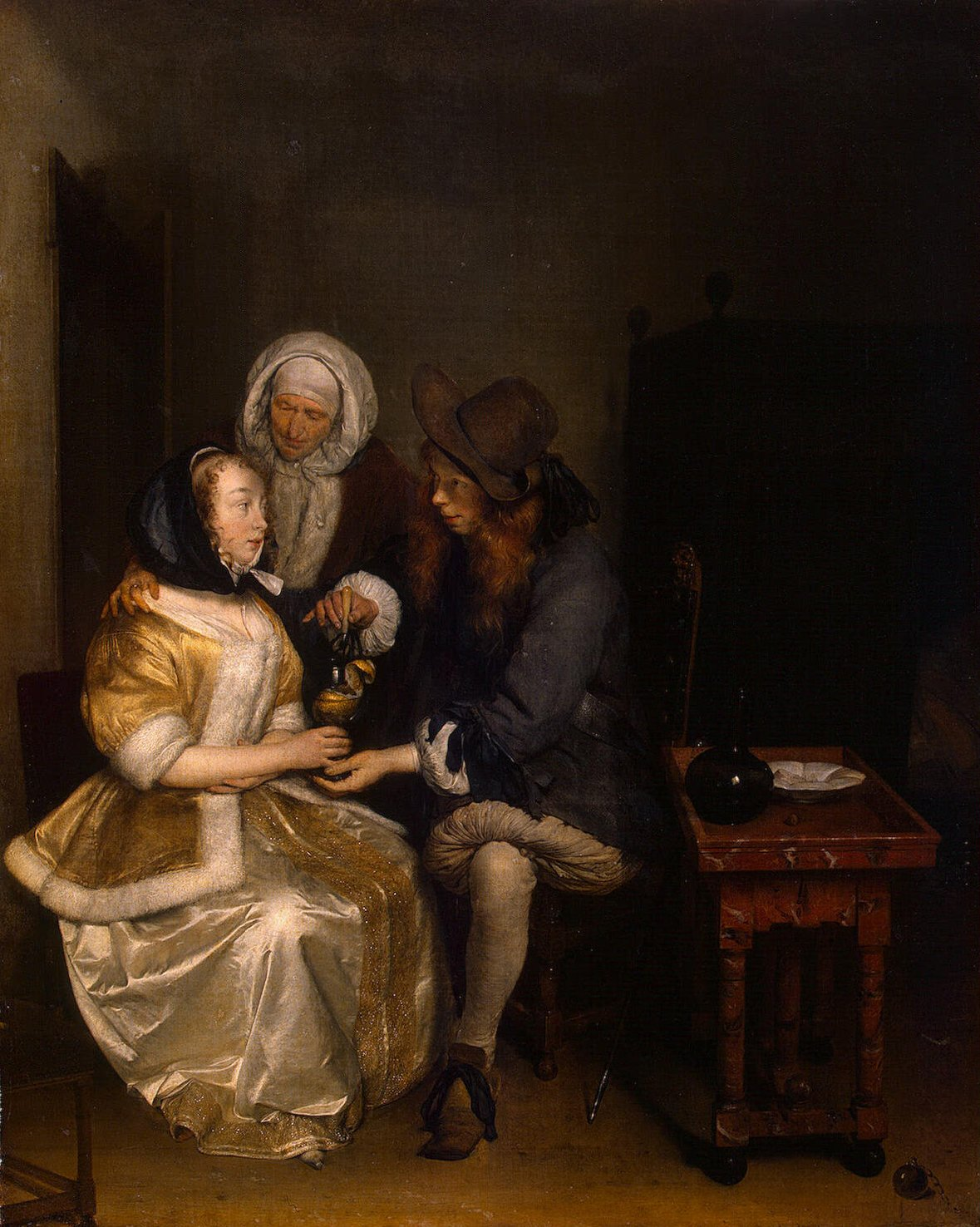
- Artist: Gerard ter Borch
- Year: c. 1664
- Catalogue: GE-881
- Medium: oil on canvas (transferred from board to canvas)
- Dimensions: 67,2 cm × 54 cm (265 in × 21 in)
- Location: State Hermitage Museum, Saint Petersburg

Glass of Lemonade (Dutch: Het glas limonade) is an oil on canvas painting by the Dutch artist Gerard ter Borch, created around 1664. It is part of the State Hermitage, in St. Petersburg, where it entered in 1815 as part of the collection of Empress Joséphine de Beauharnais. The painting is exhibited in Room 249 New Hermitage.

A replica of the painting (some researchers consider it an authorial repetition, others that it is a copy) is held in the private collection of Peter and Olga Dresmann. Glass of Lemonade is typical of ter Borch's late oeuvre, moving away from simple genre scenes to depict the private life and intimate domestic scenes of the wealthy bourgeoisie.This painting was of the first examples of Dutch domestic scenes revealing an internal psychological connection between the characters.
