= Gerard ter Borch =

Dutch Golden Age painter (1617–1681)

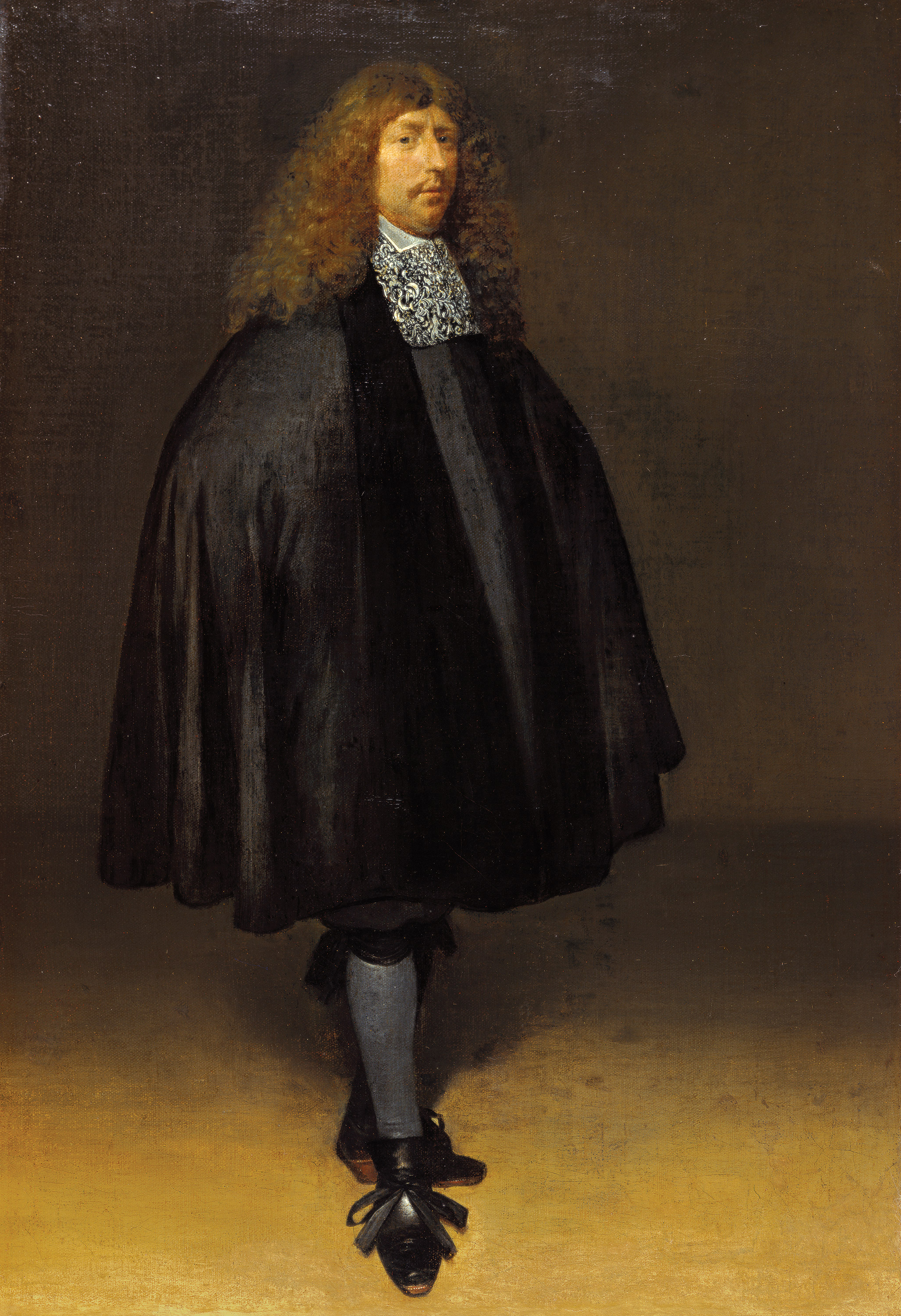
- Self-portrait by Gerard ter Borch (c. 1668)
- Born: December 1617; Zwolle, Dutch Republic
- Died: 8 December 1681 (aged 64); Deventer, Dutch Republic
- Known for: Painting

Gerard ter Borch (Dutch: [ˈɣeːrɑrt tɛr ˈbɔr(ə)x]; December 1617 – 8 December 1681), also known as Gerard Terburg (Dutch: [ˈɣeːrɑrt tɛrˈbʏr(ə)x]), was a Dutch Golden Age painter mainly of genre subjects. He influenced his fellow Dutch painters Gabriel Metsu, Gerrit Dou, Eglon van der Neer and Johannes Vermeer. According to Arthur K. Wheelock Jr., Ter Borch "established a new framework for subject matter, taking people into the sanctum of the home", showing the figures' uncertainties and expertly hinting at their inner lives. His influence as a painter, however, was later surpassed by Vermeer.

== Biography ==
Gerard ter Borch was born in December 1617 in Zwolle in the province of Overijssel in the Dutch Republic.

He received an excellent education from his father Gerard ter Borch the Elder, also an artist, and developed his talent very early. The inscription on a study of a head proves that ter Borch was at Amsterdam in 1632, where he studied possibly under Willem Cornelisz Duyster or Pieter Codde. Duyster's influence can be traced in a picture bearing the date 1638, in the Ionides Bequest (Victoria and Albert Museum, London). In 1634 he studied under Pieter de Molijn in Haarlem. A record of this Haarlem period is the Consultation (1635) at the Gemäldegalerie, Berlin.

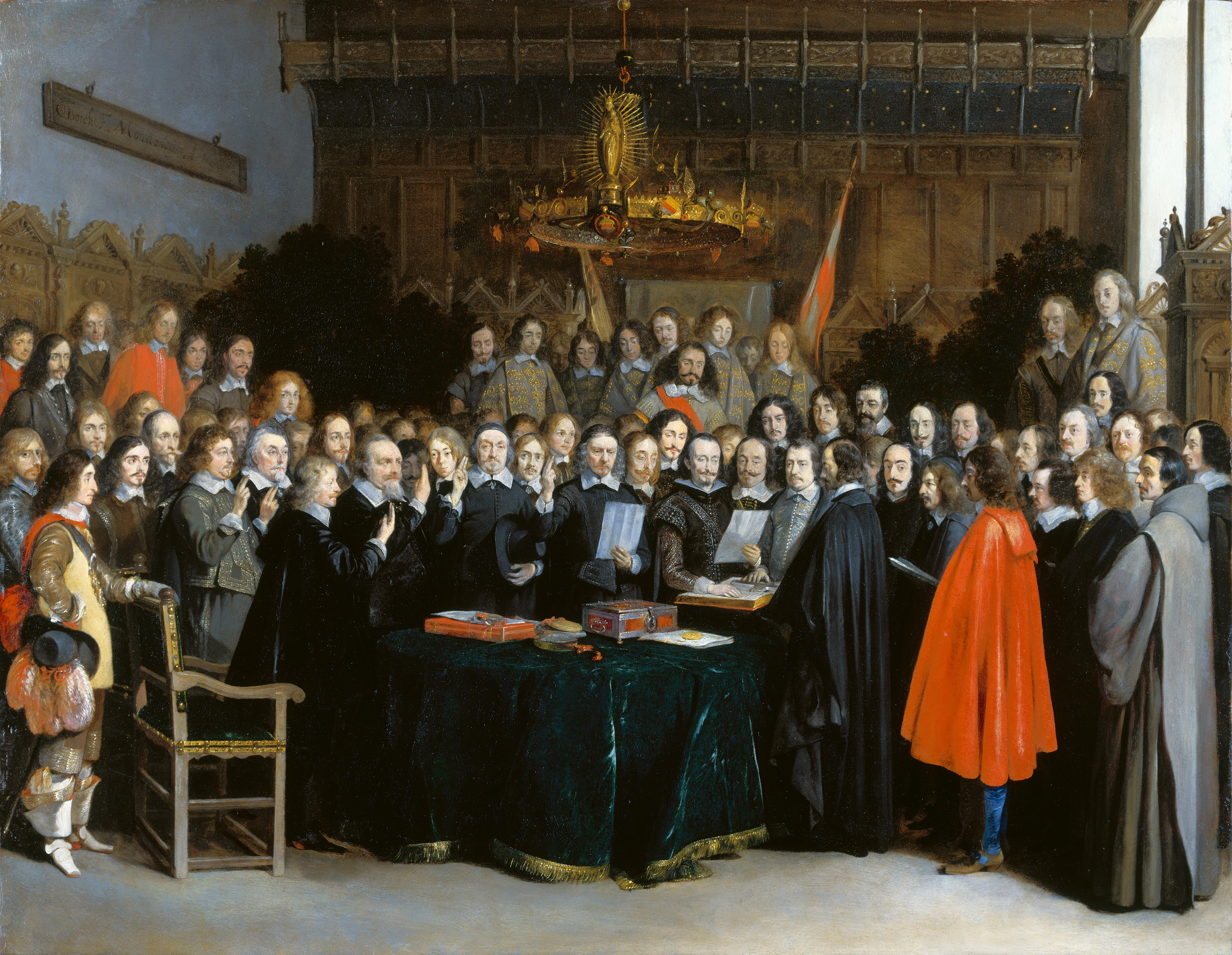
The Ratification of the Spanish-Dutch Treaty of Münster, 15 May 1648 (1648) in the collection of the Rijksmuseum in Amsterdam

In 1635, he was in London, and subsequently he traveled in Germany, France, Spain and Italy. His sister Gesina also became a painter. It is certain that he was in Rome in 1641, when he painted the small portraits on copper of Jan Six, A Young Lady (Six Collection, Amsterdam) and the portrait of a Gentlemen (DMK Collection Nuermberg). In 1648 he was at Münster during the meeting of the congress which ratified the treaty of peace between the Spaniards and the Dutch, and executed his celebrated little picture, painted upon copper, of the assembled plenipotentiaries—a work which, along with a portrait of a Man Standing ("Portrait of a Young Man"), represents the master in the National Gallery in London. The picture was bought by the Marquess of Hertford at the Demidoff sale for £7280, and presented to the National Gallery by Sir Richard Wallace, at the suggestion of his secretary, Sir John Murray Scott.

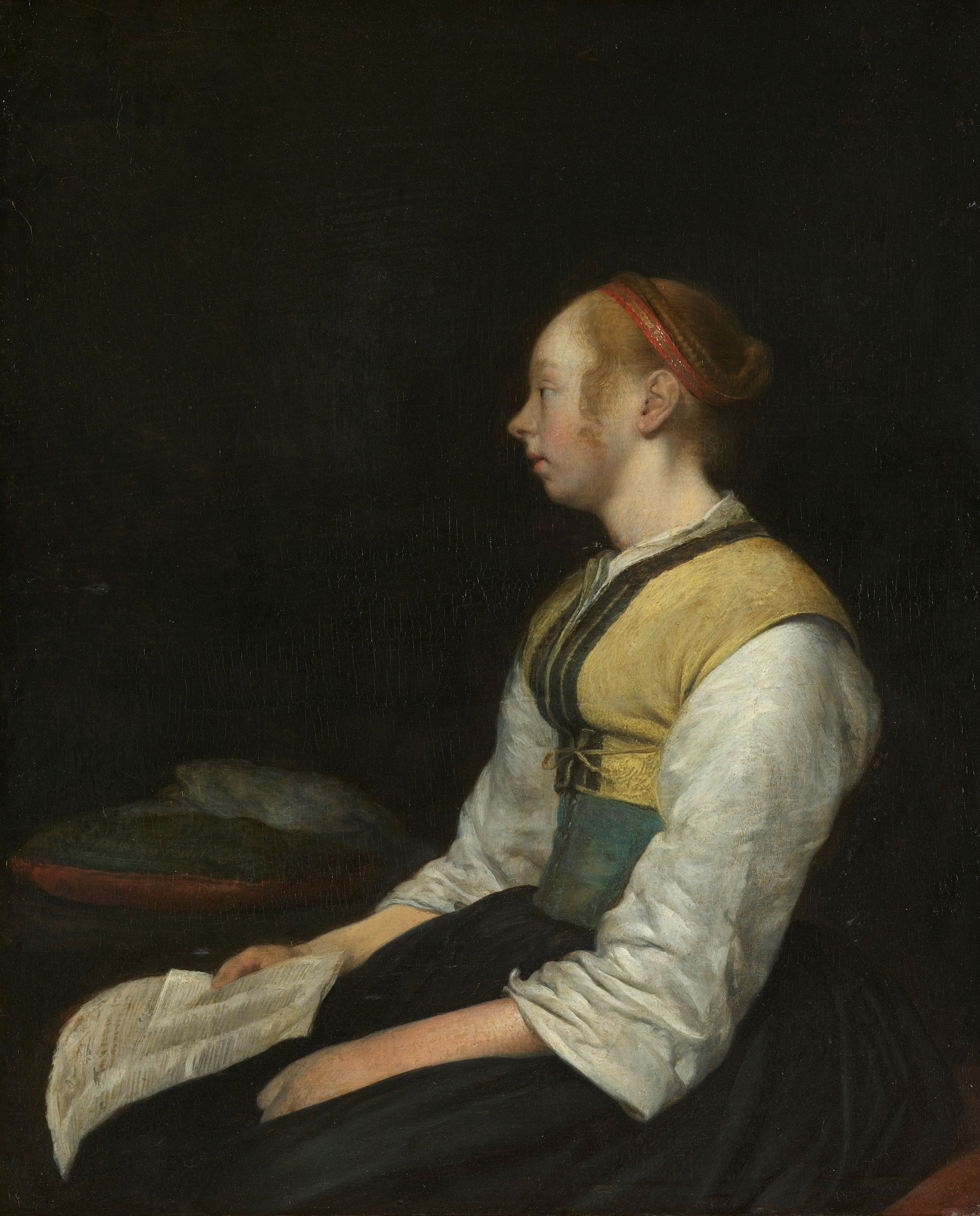
His sister Gesina modelled for his painting Sitting Young Woman (c. 1650)

At this time ter Borch was invited to visit Madrid, where he received employment and the honour of knighthood from Philip IV, but, in consequence of an intrigue, it is said, he was obliged to return to the Netherlands. One of his great patrons was Amsterdam burgomaster and statesman Andries de Graeff. He seems to have resided for a time in Haarlem; but he finally settled in Deventer, where he became a member of the town council, as which he appears in the portrait now in the gallery of The Hague. He died at Deventer in 1681.

== Notable works ==
Ter Borch is a significant painter of genre subjects. He is known for his rendering of texture in draperies, for example in The Letter and in The Gallant Conversation, engraved by Johann Georg Wille.

Ter Borch's works are comparatively rare; about eighty have been catalogued. Six of these are at the Hermitage Museum, six at the Gemäldegalerie, Berlin, five at the Louvre, four at the Gemäldegalerie Alte Meister, three at the Getty Center, and two at the Wallace Collection. A pair of portraits were located at the Corcoran Gallery in Washington D.C., highlighted in 2010 by Blake Gopnik, now in the collections of the National Gallery of Art in Washington.

The artist's painting The Suitor's Visit, c. 1658, oil on canvas, 80 x 75 cm (31½ × 29 9/16 in.) in the Andrew W. Mellon Collection, was used on the cover of Marilyn Stokstad's second edition of Art History.

== Gallery ==
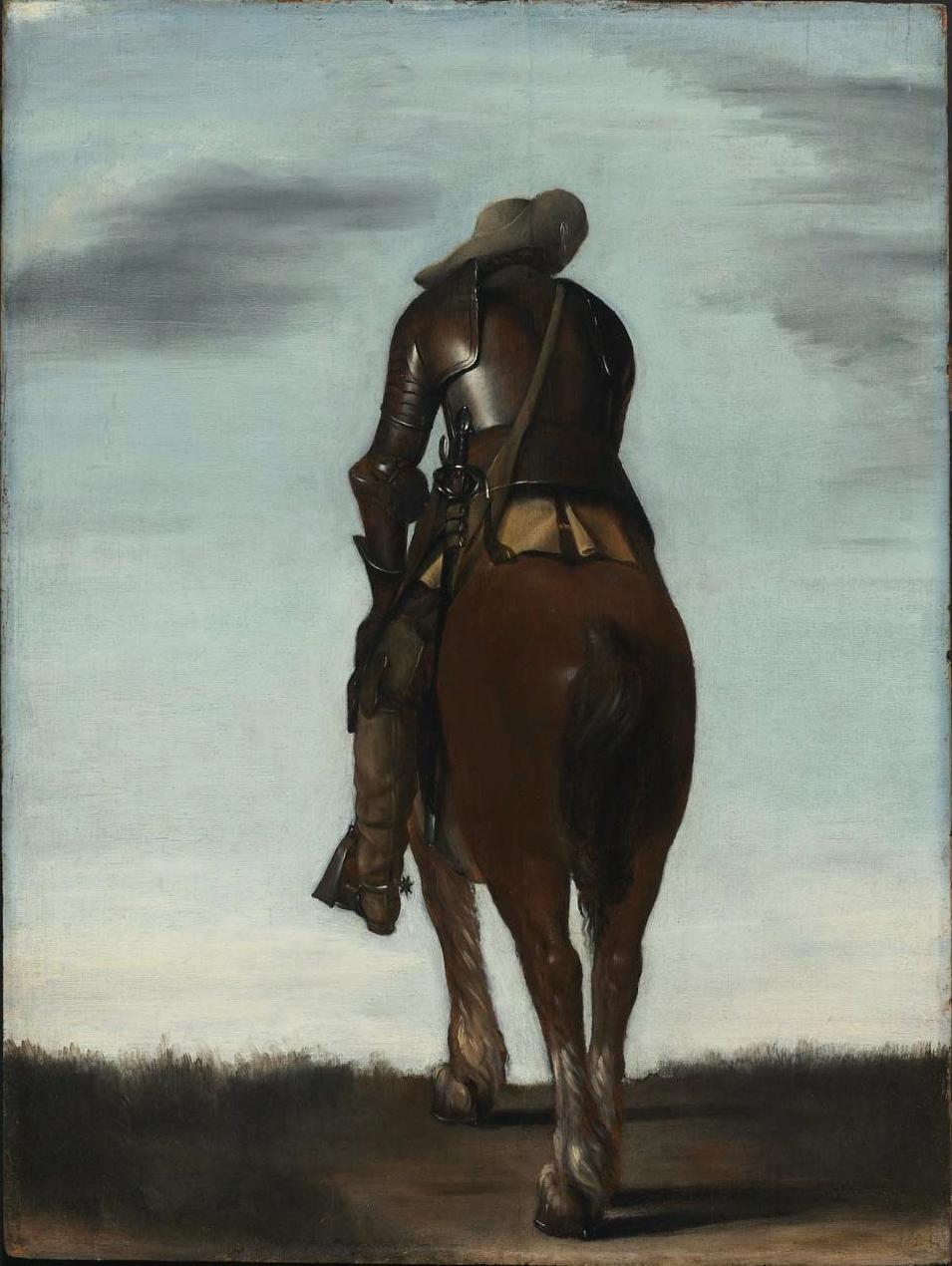
Man on Horseback (1634)

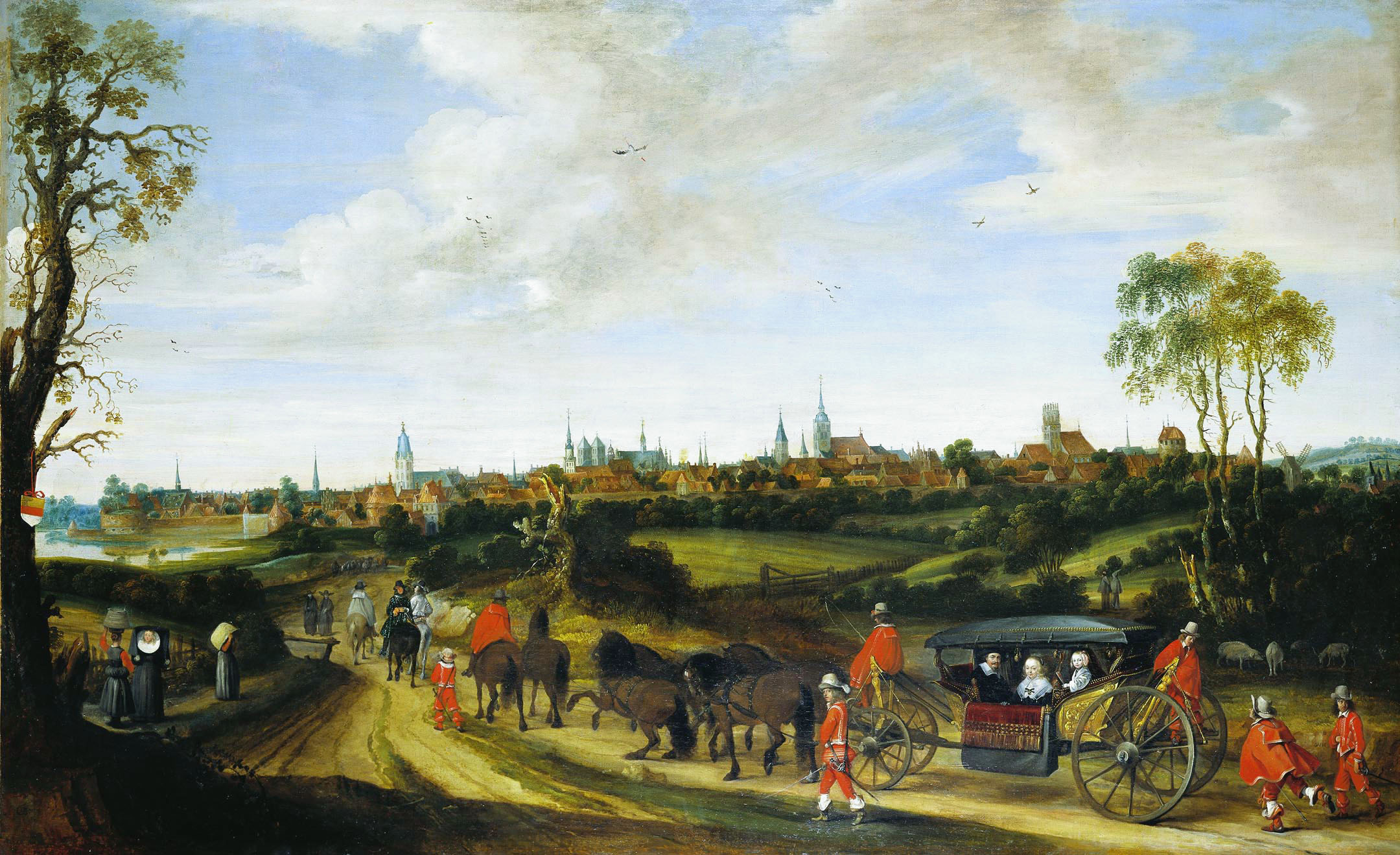
Adrian Pauw's arrival in Münster (1646)

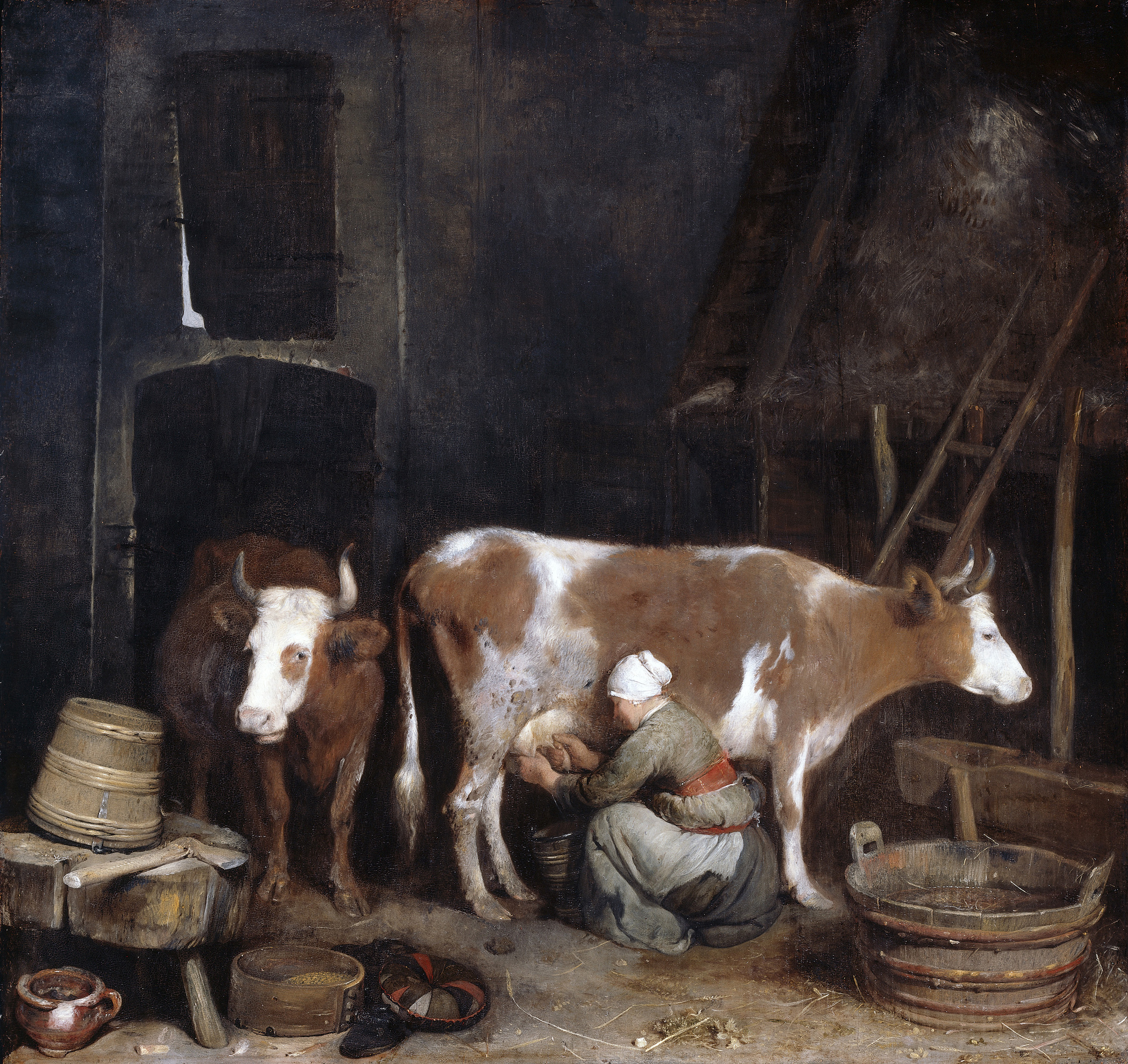
A Maid Milking a Cow in a Barn (c. 1652–54)

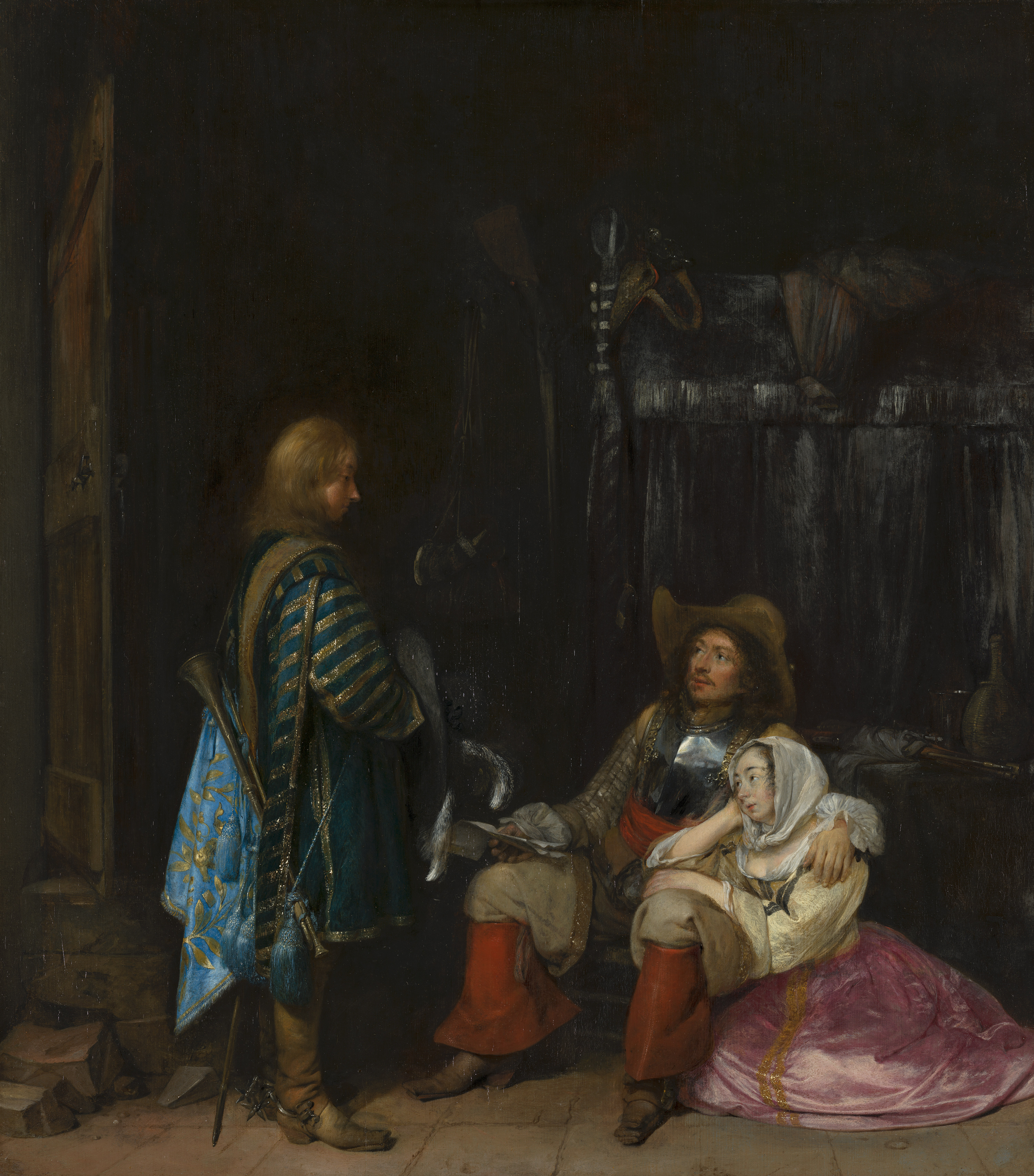
The Messenger (The Unwelcome News) (1653), Mauritshuis

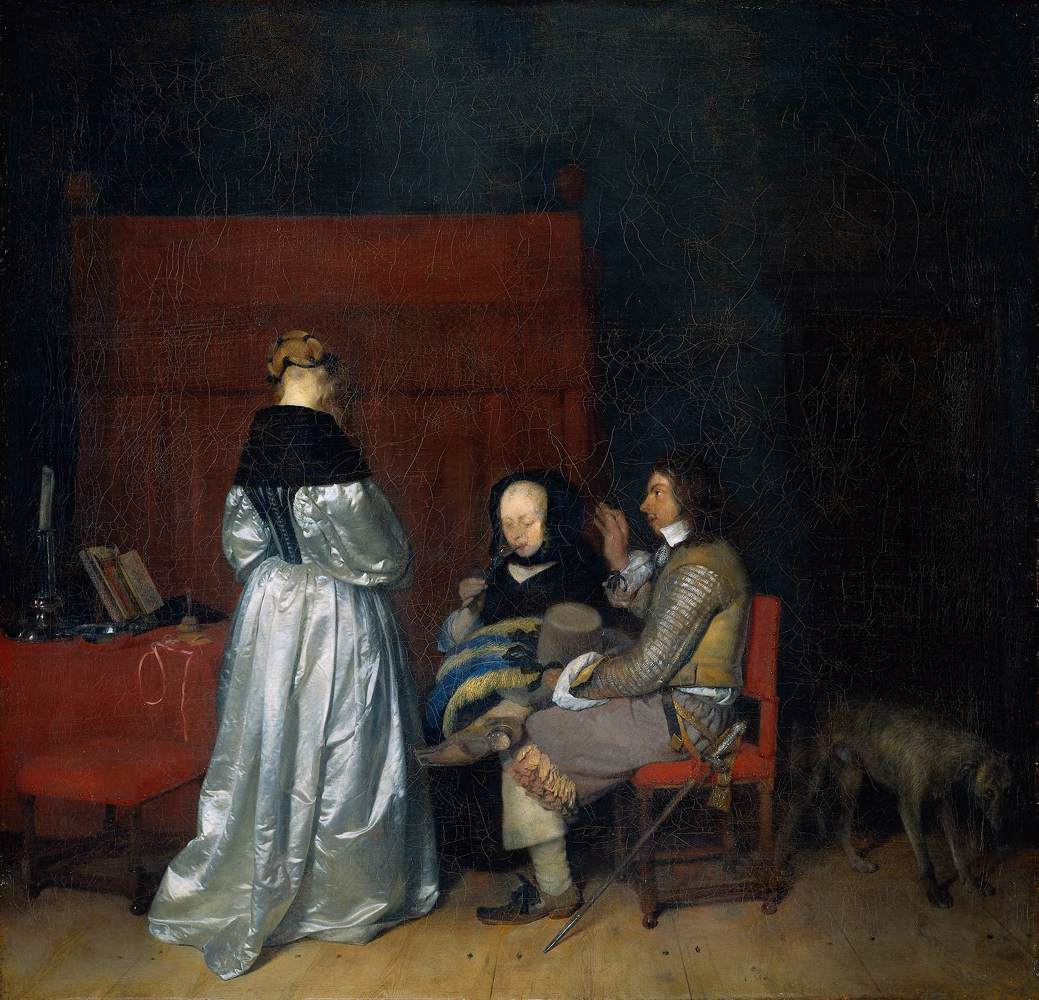
The Gallant Conversation (The Paternal Admonition) (c. 1654)

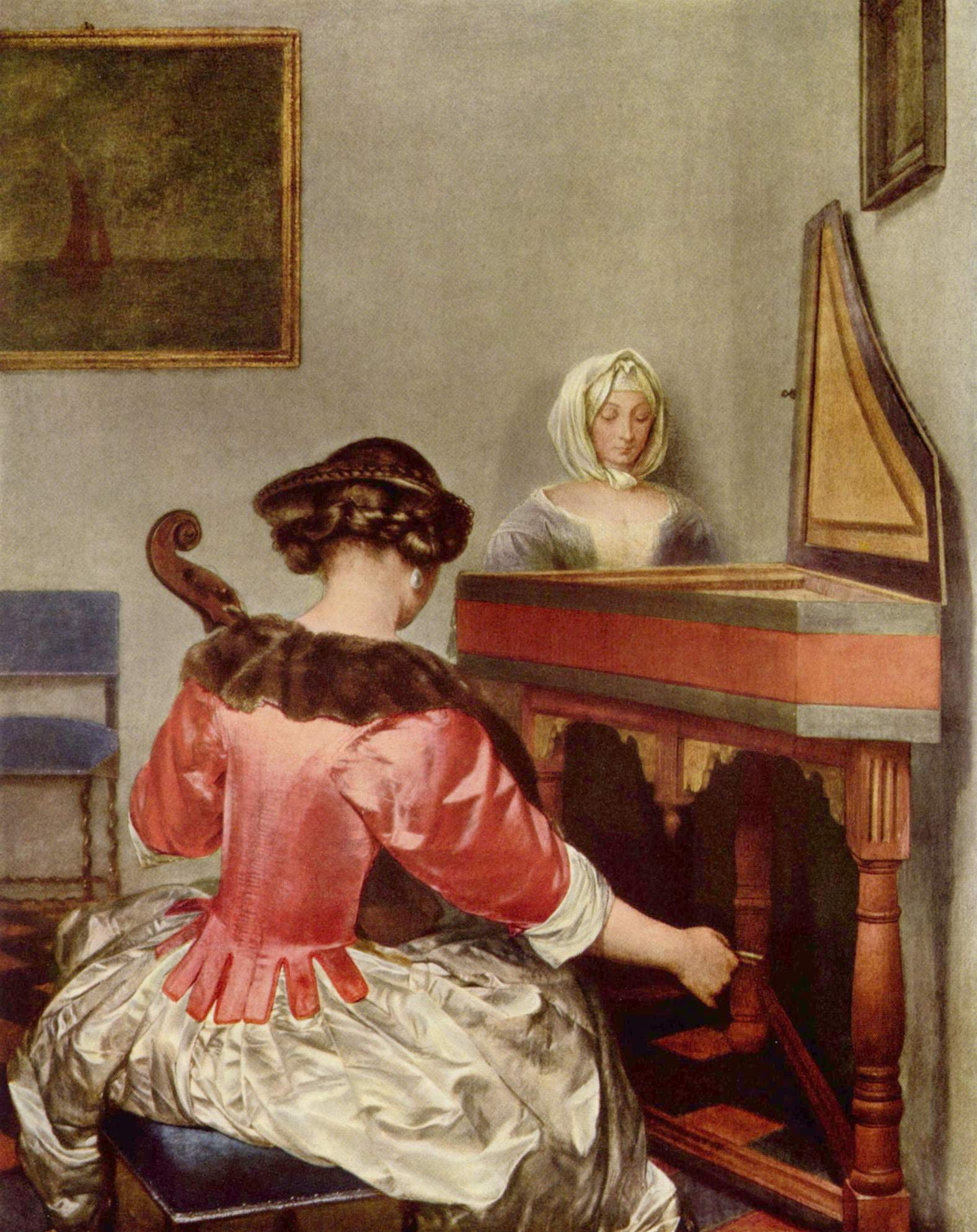
The concert (1655)

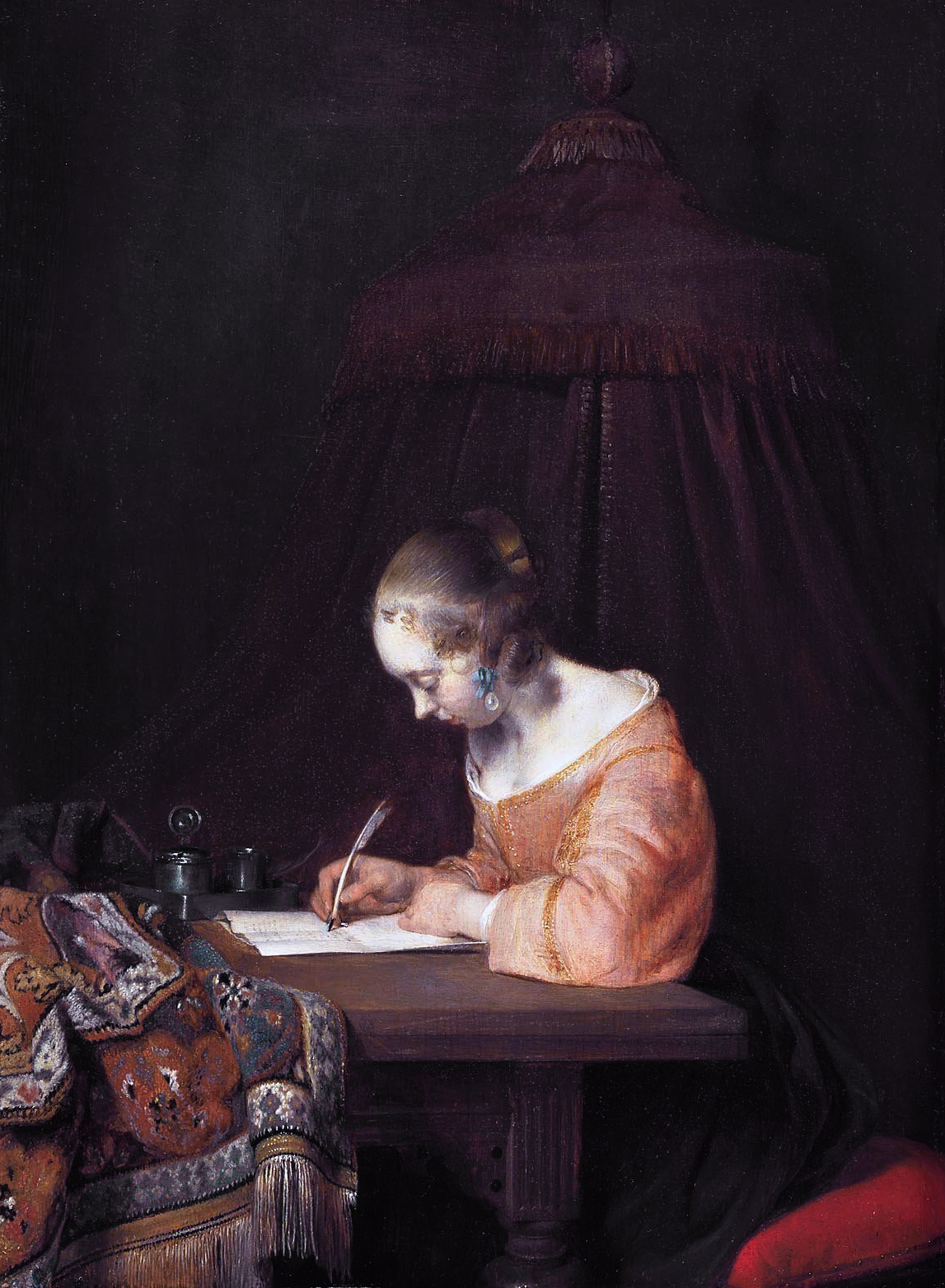
Woman writing a letter (c. 1655)

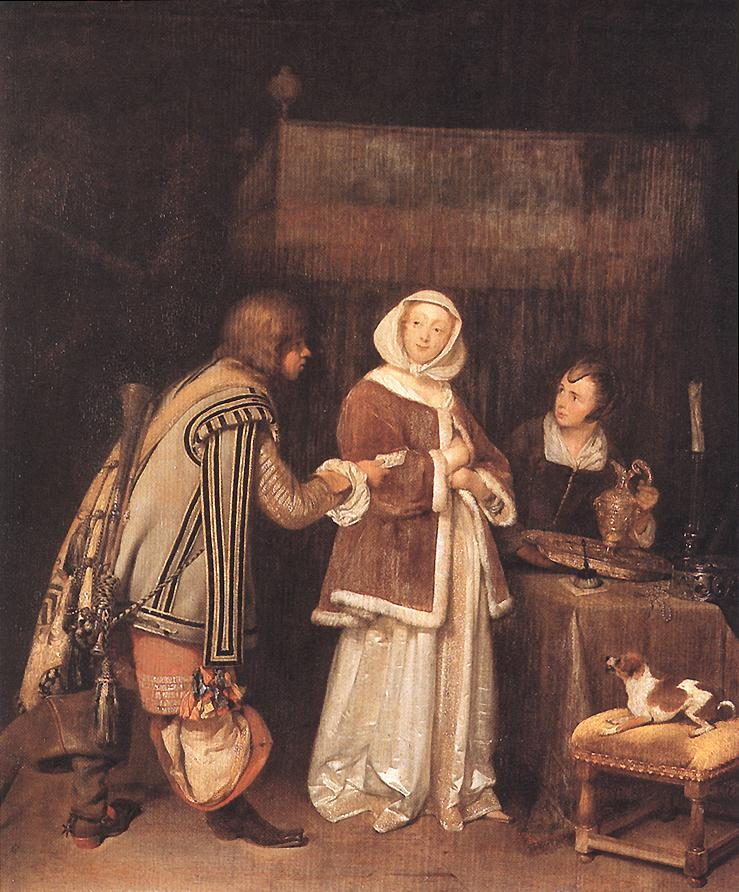
The letter (c. 1655)

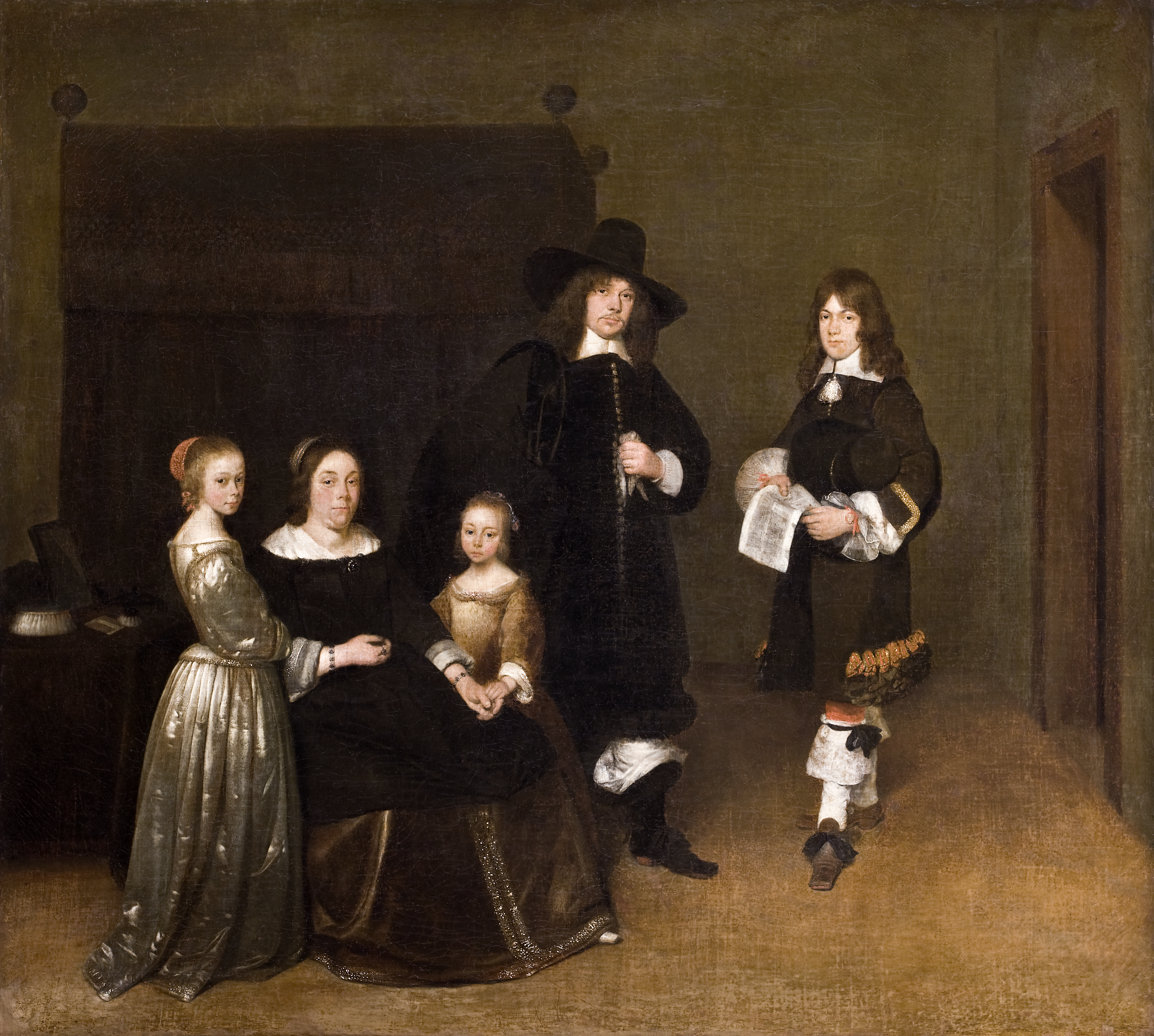
Portrait of a Family (after 1656)

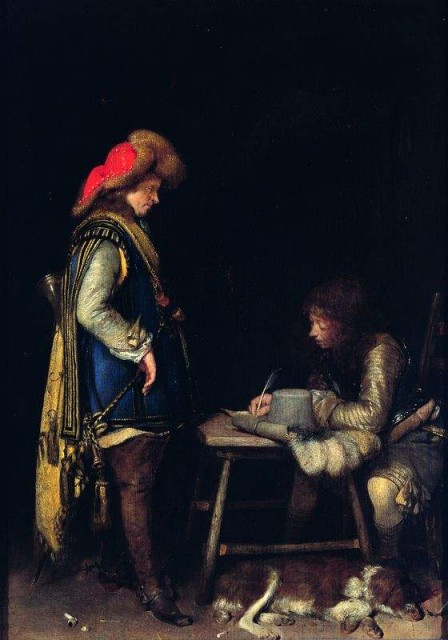
An officer dictating a letter (c. 1657–58)

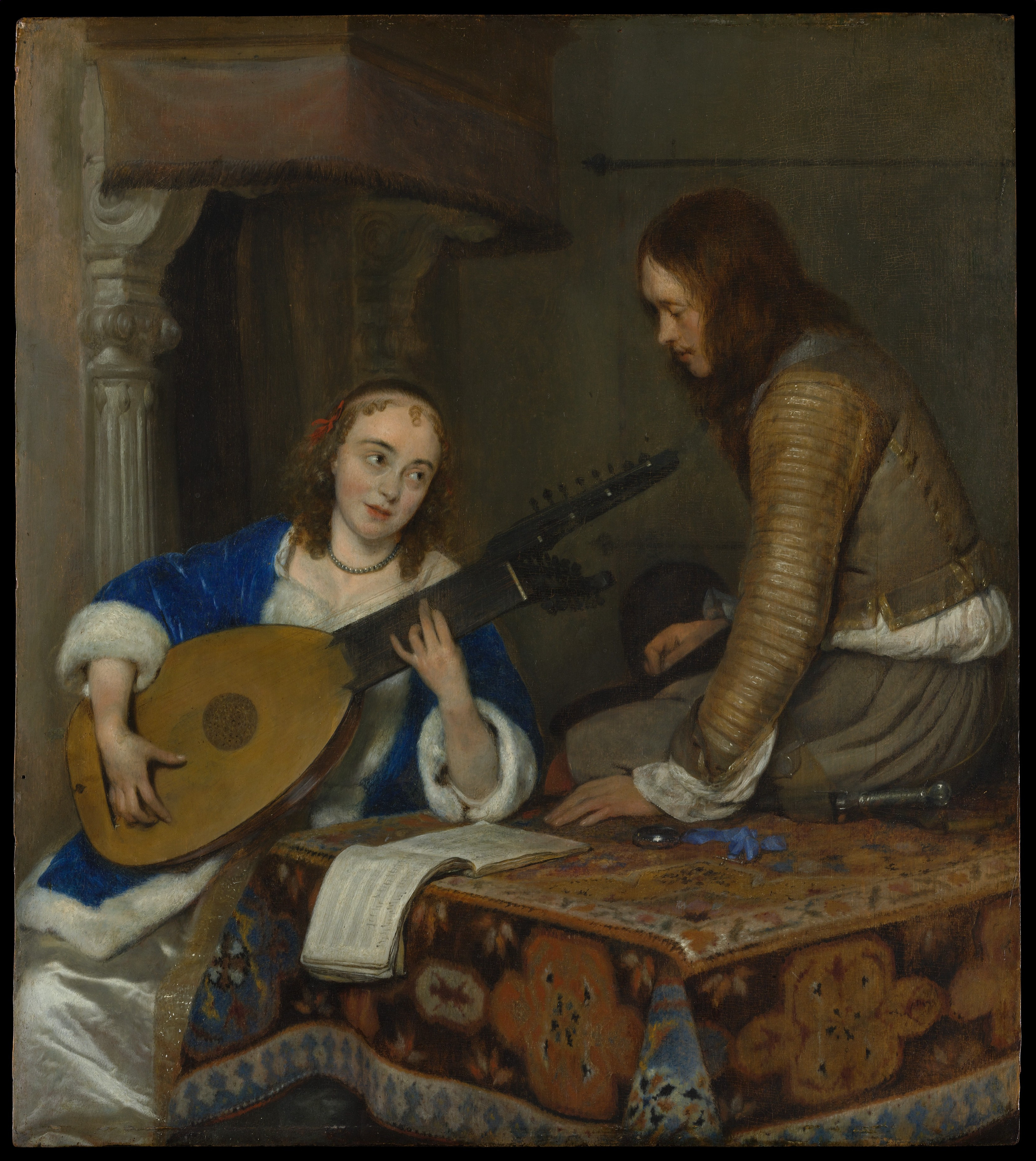
A Woman Playing the Theorbo-Lute and a Cavalier, circa 1658, Metropolitan Museum of Art

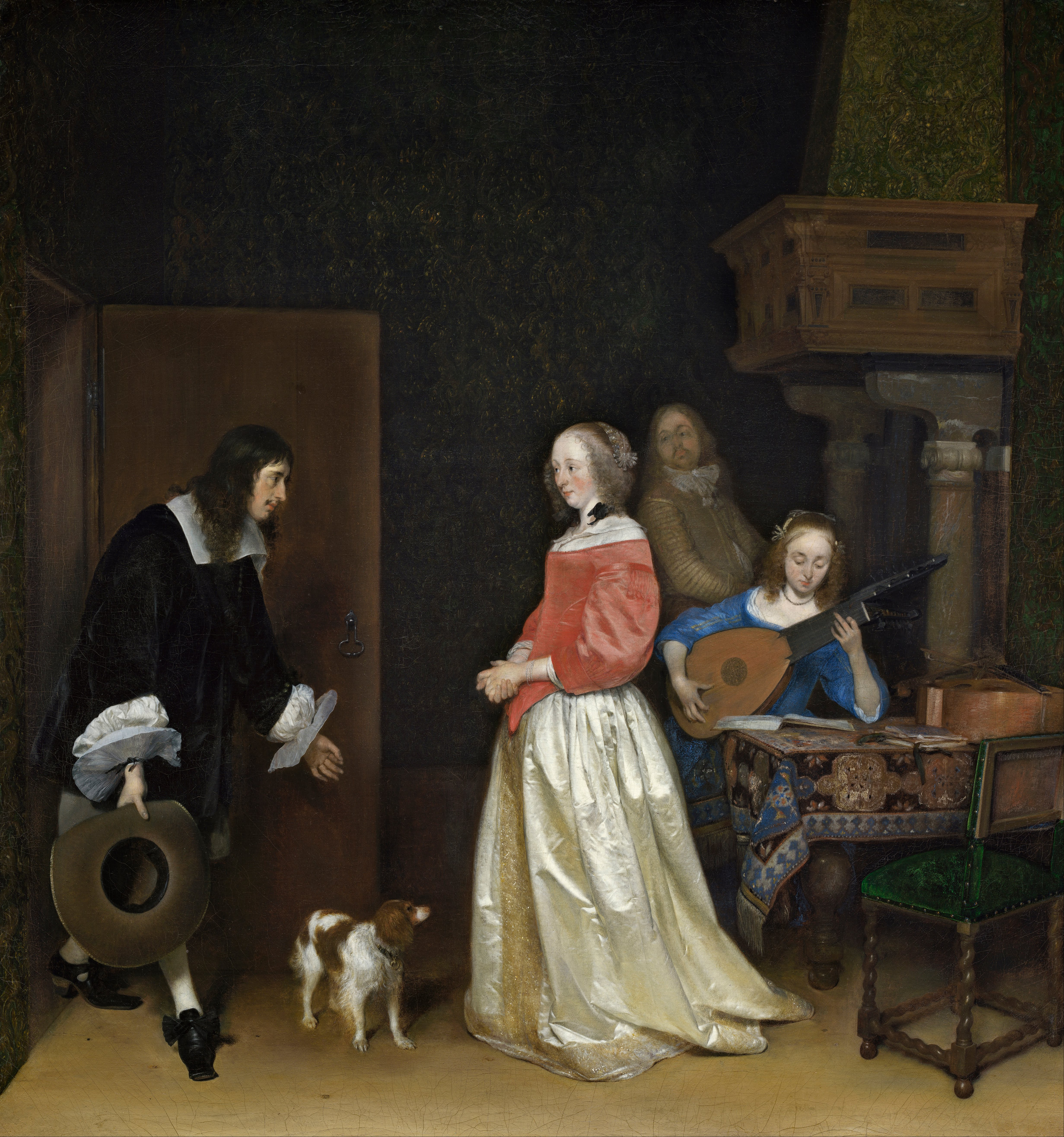
The Suitor's Visit (c. 1658)

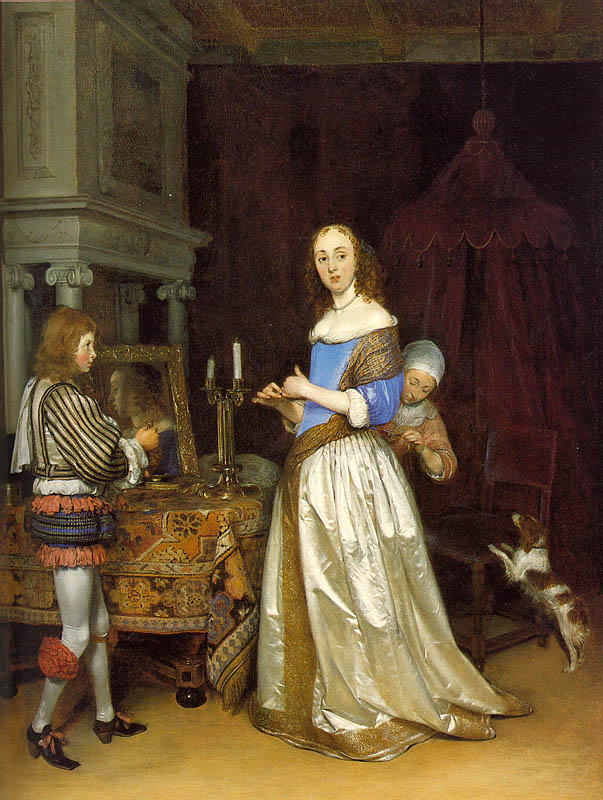
Lady at her Toilette (1660)

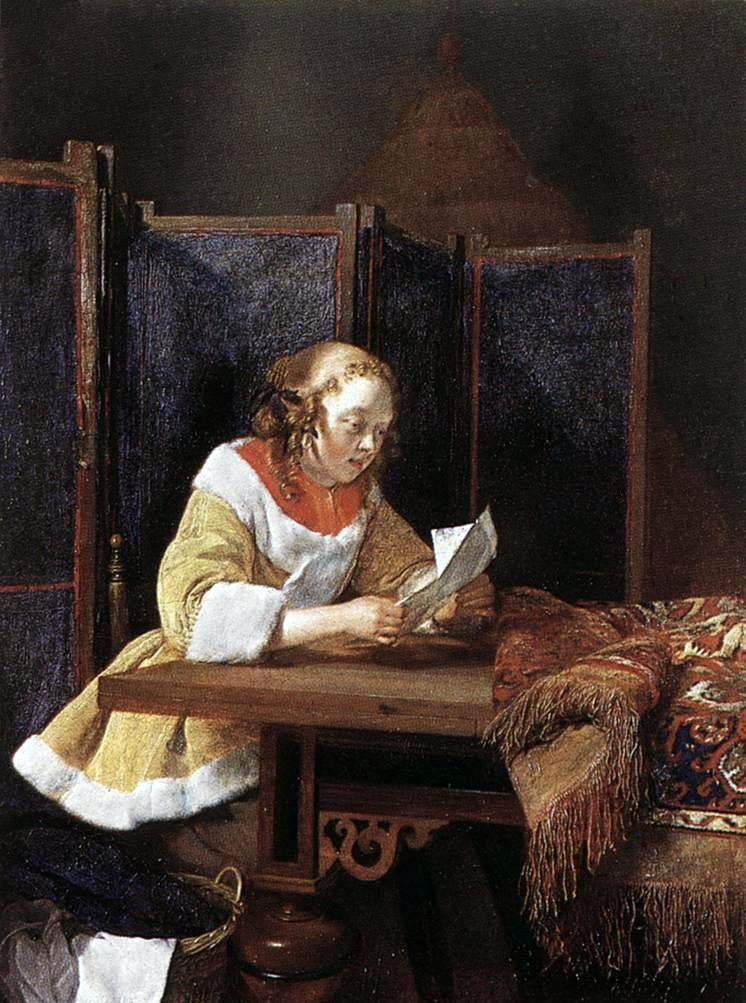
A Lady Reading a Letter (1662)

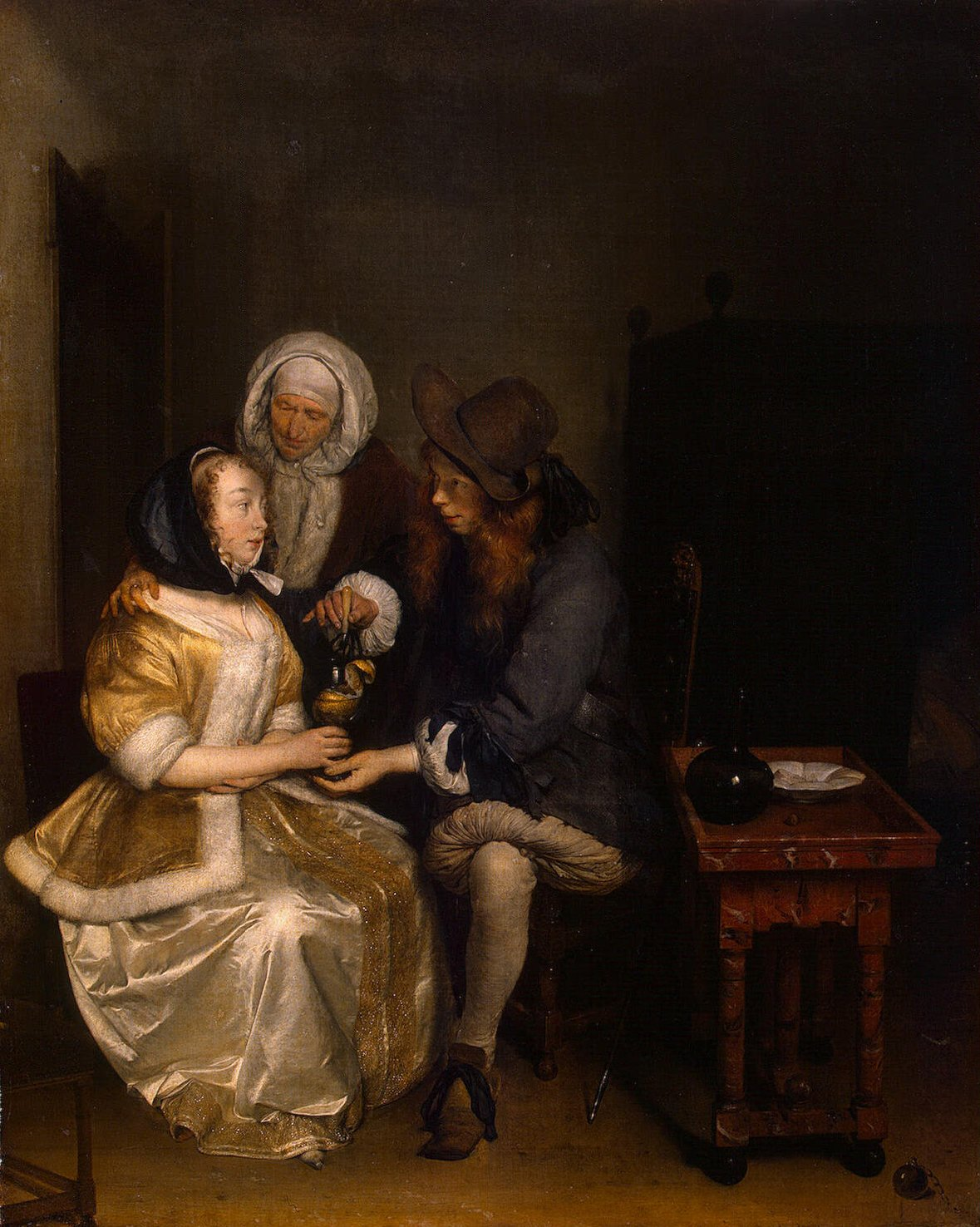
Glass of Lemonade (c. 1664)

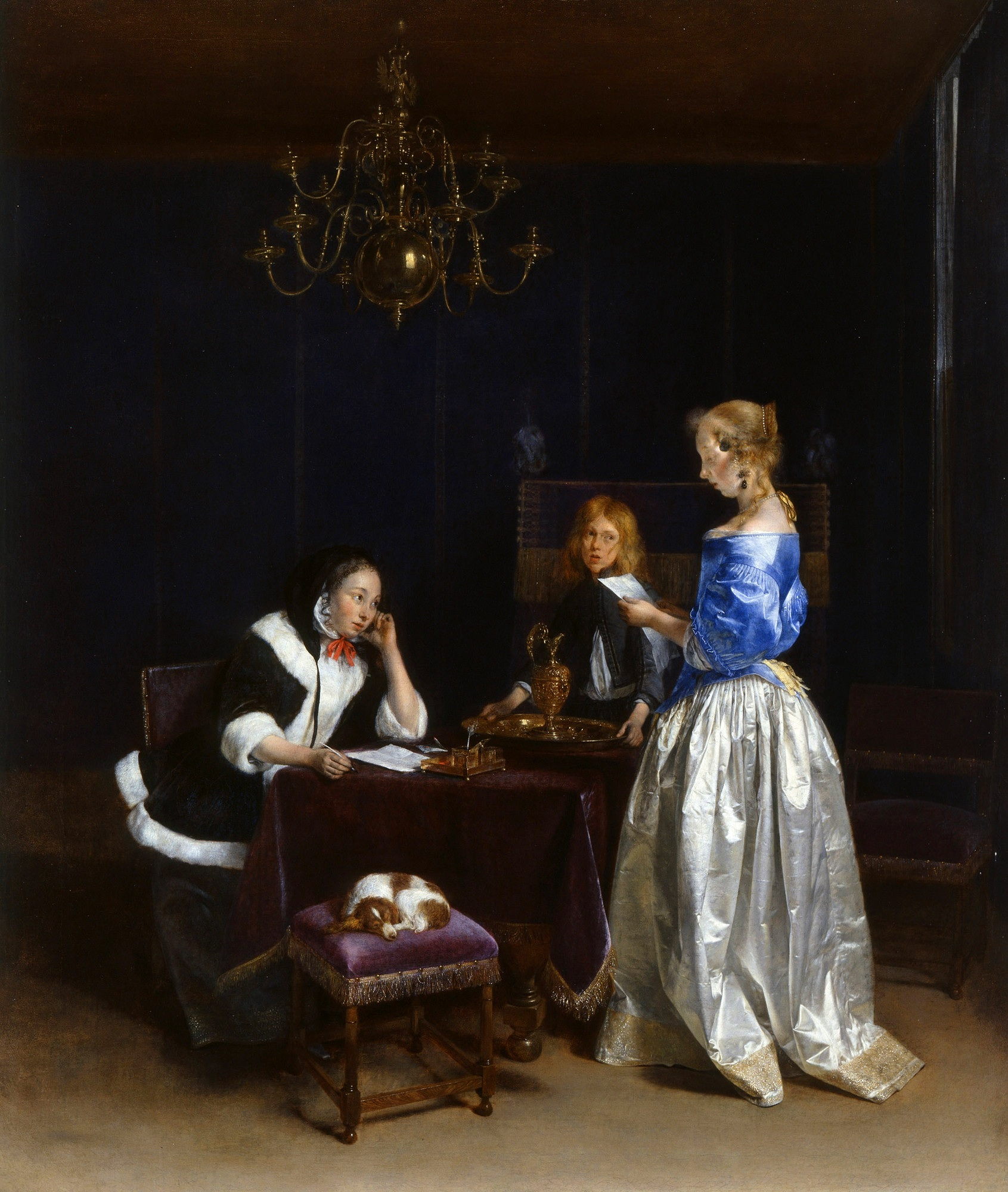
The Letter (c. 1660–1665)

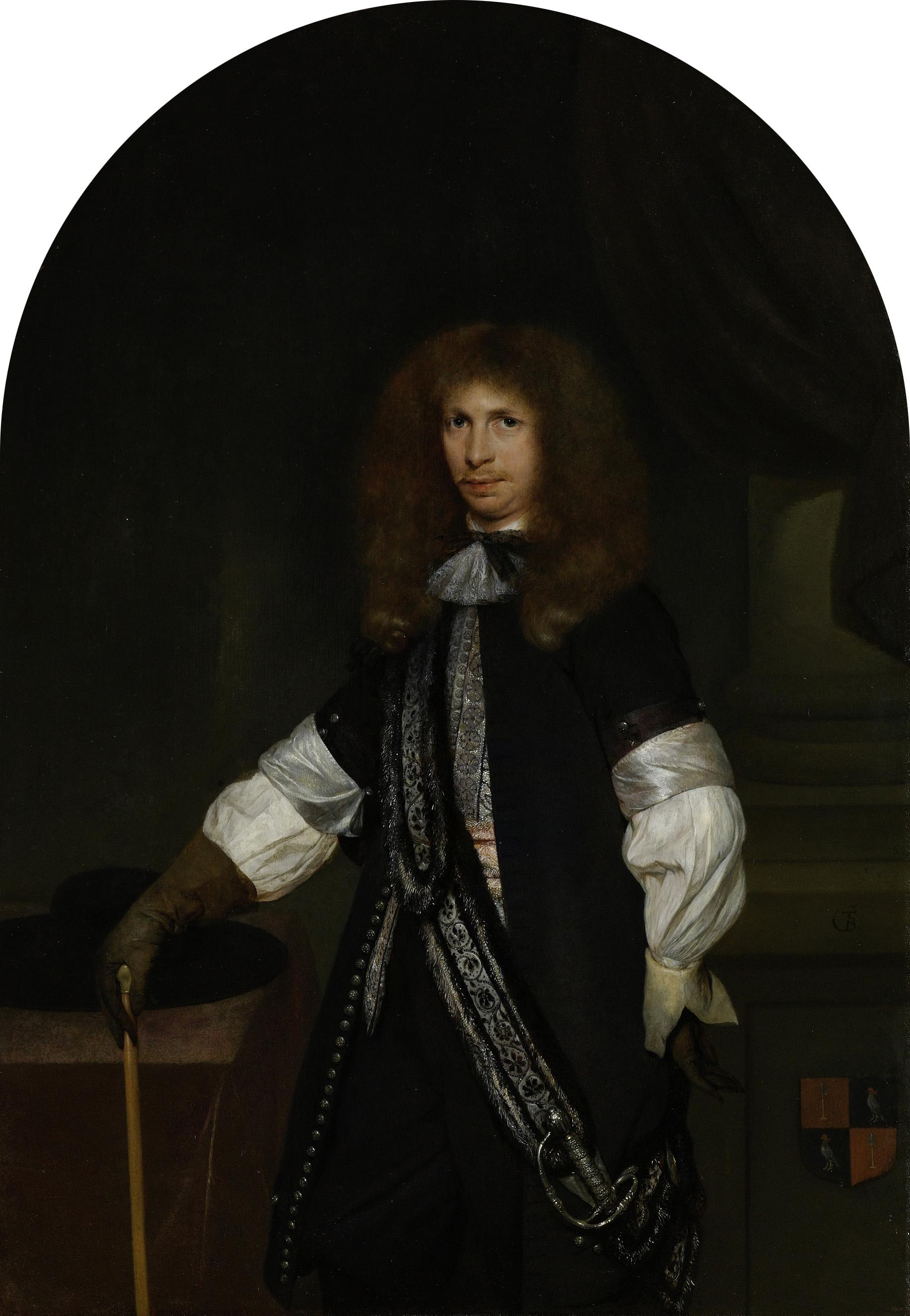
Portrait of Jacob de Graeff, free lord of Purmerland and Ilpendam (between 1670 and 1681)

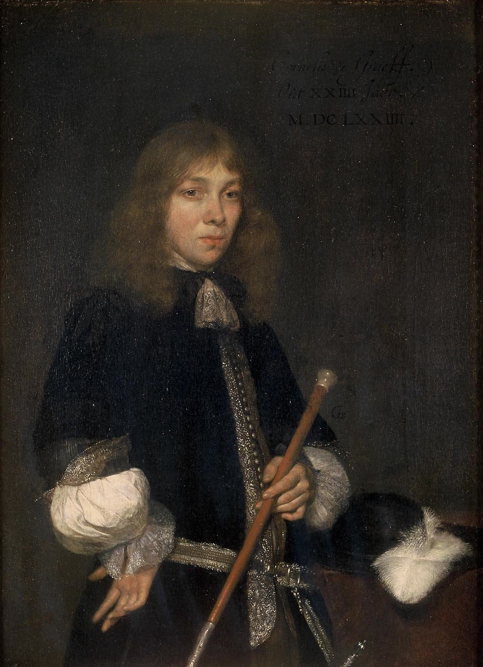
Portrait of Cornelis HrR Ridder de Graeff (1673)

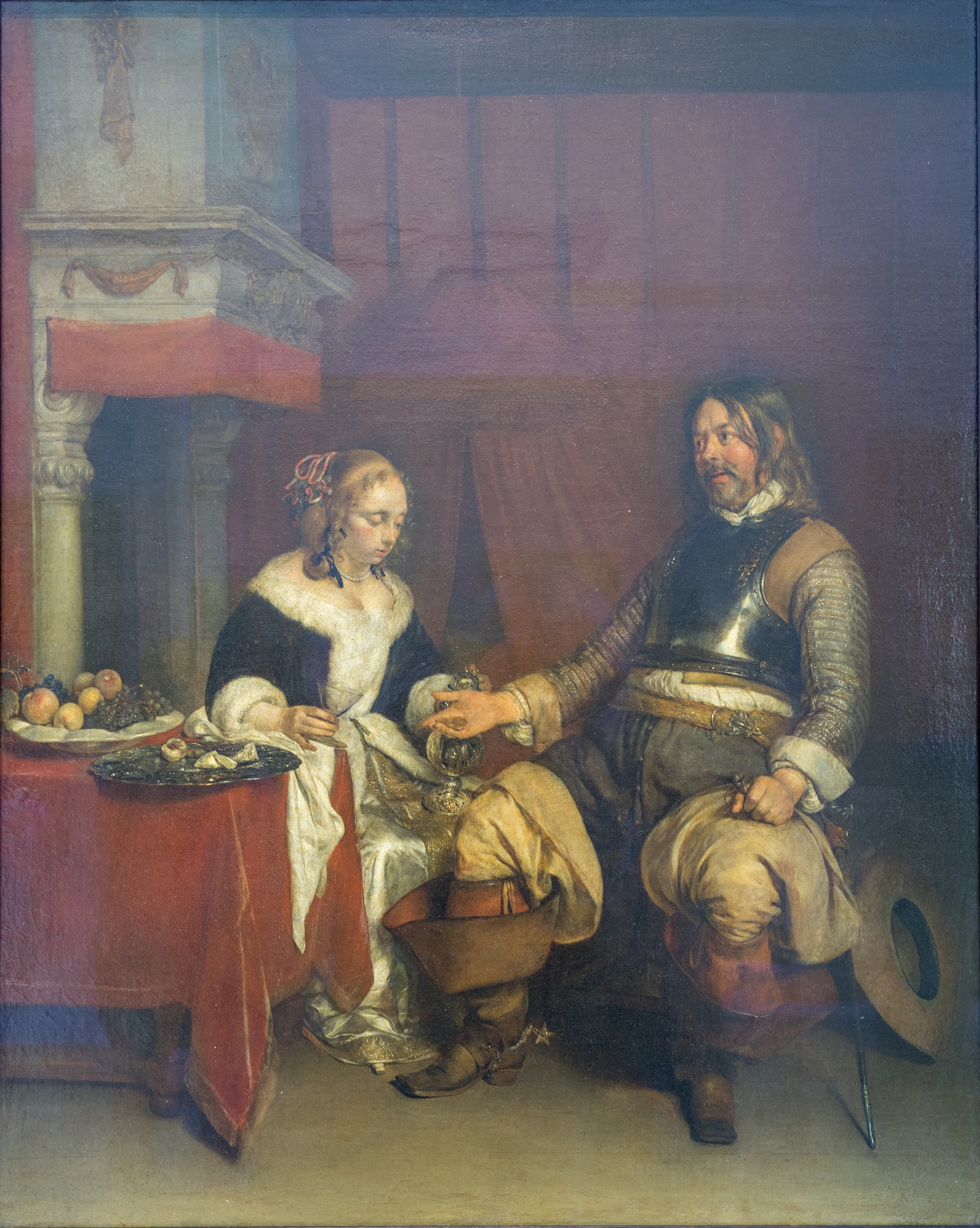
The Military Gallant, Louvre Museum

== Claim for Nazi-looted art ==
In 2007, the heirs to the retail magnate Max Emden requested that the National Gallery of Victoria restitute the Gerard ter Borch painting Lady with a Fan which Emden had owned prior to the rise of the Nazis.
