= Boris Yeltsin =

President of Russia from 1991 to 1999

- Борис Ельцин
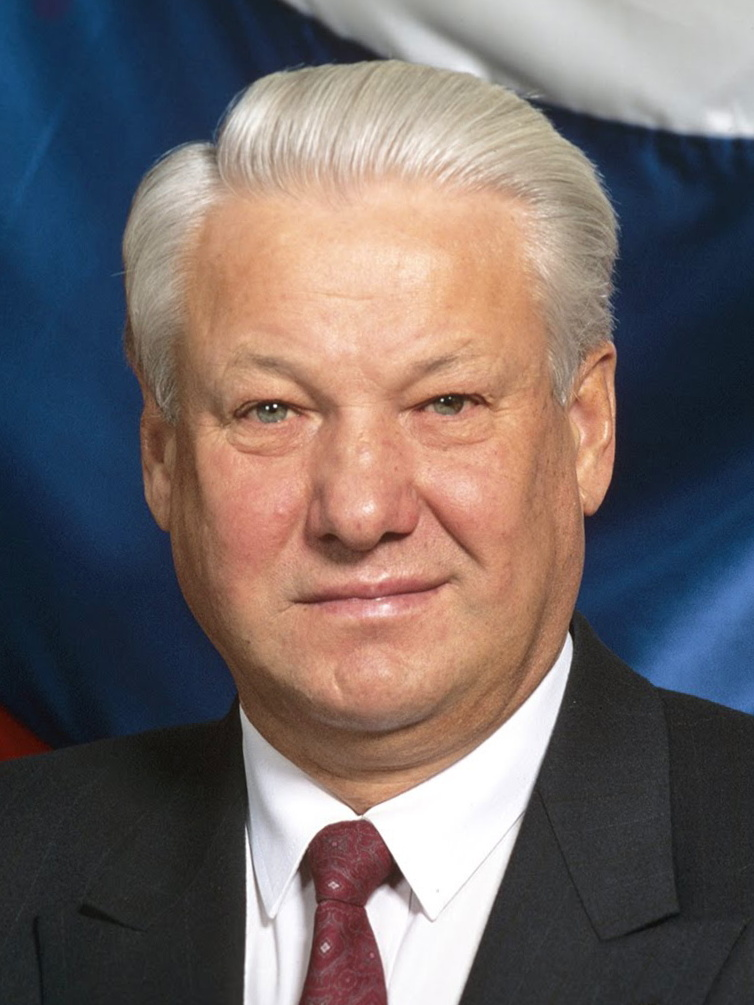
- Official portrait, 1992

President of Russia (Note: As President of the Russian SFSR within the Soviet Union until 25 December 1991, thereafter as President of the independent Russian Federation.)
- In office 10 July 1991 – 31 December 1999 (Note: Disputed with Alexander Rutskoy as Acting President from 22 September to 4 October 1993.) (Note: Viktor Chernomyrdin served as Acting President from 5 to 6 November 1996.)
- Prime Minister: Ivan Silayev; Oleg Lobov (acting); Himself (interim); Yegor Gaidar (acting); Viktor Chernomyrdin; Sergey Kiriyenko; Viktor Chernomyrdin (acting); Yevgeny Primakov; Sergei Stepashin; Vladimir Putin
- Vice President: Alexander Rutskoy (1991–1993)
- Preceded by: Himself (as Chairman of the Supreme Soviet of the Russian SFSR) (Note: Received the powers of the President of the Soviet Union, Mikhail Gorbachev, on 25 December 1991.)
- Succeeded by: Vladimir Putin

Interim Head of Government of Russia (Note: Of the Russian SFSR within the Soviet Union until 25 December 1991, thereafter of the independent Russian Federation.)
- In office 15 November 1991 – 15 June 1992
- President: Himself
- Deputy: Alexander Shokhin; Viktor Chernomyrdin; Sergey Shakhray; Mikhail Poltoranin; Valery Makharadze; Georgy Khizha; Anatoly Chubais; Boris Saltykov
- First Deputy: Gennady Burbulis; Yegor Gaidar; Vladimir Shumeyko
- Preceded by: Oleg Lobov (acting) (Note: Received the powers of the Prime Minister of the Soviet Union, de facto exercised by Ivan Silayev, on 25 December 1991.)
- Succeeded by: Yegor Gaidar (acting)

Chairman of the Supreme Soviet of the Russian SFSR
- In office 29 May 1990 – 10 July 1991
- Premier: Aleksandr Vlasov; Ivan Silayev
- Preceded by: Vitaly Vorotnikov (as Chairman of the Presidium of the Supreme Soviet of the Russian SFSR)
- Succeeded by: Ruslan Khasbulatov (Note: Himself (as head of state as President).)

First Secretary of the Moscow City Committee of the Communist Party
- In office 23 December 1985 – 11 November 1987
- Preceded by: Viktor Grishin
- Succeeded by: Lev Zaykov

Personal details
- Born: 1 February 1931 Butka, Ural Oblast, Russian SFSR, Soviet Union
- Died: 23 April 2007 (aged 76) Moscow, Russia
- Resting place: Novodevichy Cemetery
- Party: CPSU (1961–1990); Independent (Note: Although officially unaffiliated with any party, he was supported by Democratic Russia (1988–1993), Democratic Choice of Russia (1993–1995), Our Home – Russia (1995–1999) and Unity (1999)) (after 1990)
- Other political affiliations: Inter-Regional Deputies' Group (1989–1991)
- Spouse: Naina Girina (m. 1956)
- Children: 2, including Tatyana
- Education: Ural State Technical University
- Yeltsin's voice Yeltsin's 1999 New Year's address and resignation speech Recorded 31 December 1999
- Central institution membership: 1986–1988: Candidate member, 26th, 27th Politburo; 1985–1986: Member, 26th Secretariat; 1981–1990: Full member, 26th, 27th Central Committee; Other offices held: 1992: Acting Minister, Defence; 1976–1985: First Secretary, Sverdlovsk Regional Committee of the Communist Party of the Soviet Union; 1989–1991: Member, Congress of People's Deputies of the Soviet Union; 1978–1991: Member, Supreme Soviet of the Soviet Union

Boris Nikolayevich Yeltsin (Note: Russian: Борис Николаевич Ельцин, IPA: [bɐˈrʲis nʲɪkɐˈlajɪvʲɪtɕ ˈjelʲtsɨn].) (1 February 1931 – 23 April 2007) was a Soviet and Russian politician who served as President of Russia from 1991 to 1999, having previously served as Chairman of the Supreme Soviet of the Russian SFSR from 1990 to 1991. He was a member of the Communist Party of the Soviet Union (CPSU) from 1961 to 1990. He later stood as a political independent, during which time he was viewed as being ideologically aligned with liberalism.

Yeltsin was born in Butka, Ural Oblast. Growing up in Kazan and Berezniki, he worked in construction after studying at the Ural State Technical University. After joining the Communist Party, he rose through its ranks, and in 1976, he became First Secretary of the party's Sverdlovsk Oblast committee. Yeltsin was initially a supporter of the perestroika reforms of Soviet leader Mikhail Gorbachev. He later criticized the reforms as being too moderate and called for a transition to a multi-party representative democracy. In 1987, he was the first person to resign from the Politburo of the Communist Party of the Soviet Union, which established his popularity as an anti-establishment figure and after which he earned the reputation of the leader of the anti-communist movement.

Elected chair of the Russian Supreme Soviet in 1990, Yeltsin was elected president of the Russian Soviet Federative Socialist Republic (RSFSR) in 1991, becoming the first popularly-elected head of state in Russian history. He allied with various non-Russian nationalist leaders and was instrumental in the formal dissolution of the Soviet Union in December of that year. With the dissolution of the Soviet Union, the RSFSR became the Russian Federation, an independent state. Through that transition, Yeltsin remained in office as president. He was later re-elected in the 1996 Russian presidential election, which critics assert was rigged. Yeltsin oversaw the transition of Russia's command economy into a capitalist market economy by implementing economic shock therapy, market exchange rate of the ruble, nationwide privatization, and lifting of price controls. Economic downturn, volatility, and inflation ensued. Amid the economic shift, a small number of oligarchs obtained most of the national property and wealth, while international monopolies dominated the market.

A constitutional crisis emerged in 1993 after Yeltsin ordered the unconstitutional dissolution of the Russian parliament, leading parliament to impeach him. The crisis ended after troops loyal to Yeltsin stormed the parliament building and stopped an armed uprising; he then introduced a new constitution which significantly expanded the powers of the president. After the crisis, Yeltsin governed the country in a rule by decree until 1994, as the Supreme Soviet of Russia was absent. Secessionist sentiment in the Russian Caucasus led to the First Chechen War, War of Dagestan, and Second Chechen War between 1994 and 1999. Internationally, Yeltsin promoted renewed collaboration with Europe and signed arms control agreements with the United States. Although he was reelected to a second term in 1996, growing internal pressure led him to resign by the end of 1999, being succeeded as president by his chosen successor, Vladimir Putin, whom he had appointed prime minister a few months earlier. After leaving office, he kept a low profile and was accorded a state funeral upon his death in 2007.

Domestically, Yeltsin was highly popular in the late 1980s and early 1990s. However, his reputation was severely damaged by the economic and political crises of his presidency, and he left office widely unpopular with the Russian population. He has received praise and criticism for his role in dismantling the Soviet Union, transforming Russia into a representative democracy, and introducing new freedoms to the country. Conversely, he has been accused of economic mismanagement, abuse of presidential power, autocratic behavior, corruption, and of undermining Russia's standing as a major world power.

== Early life, education and early career ==
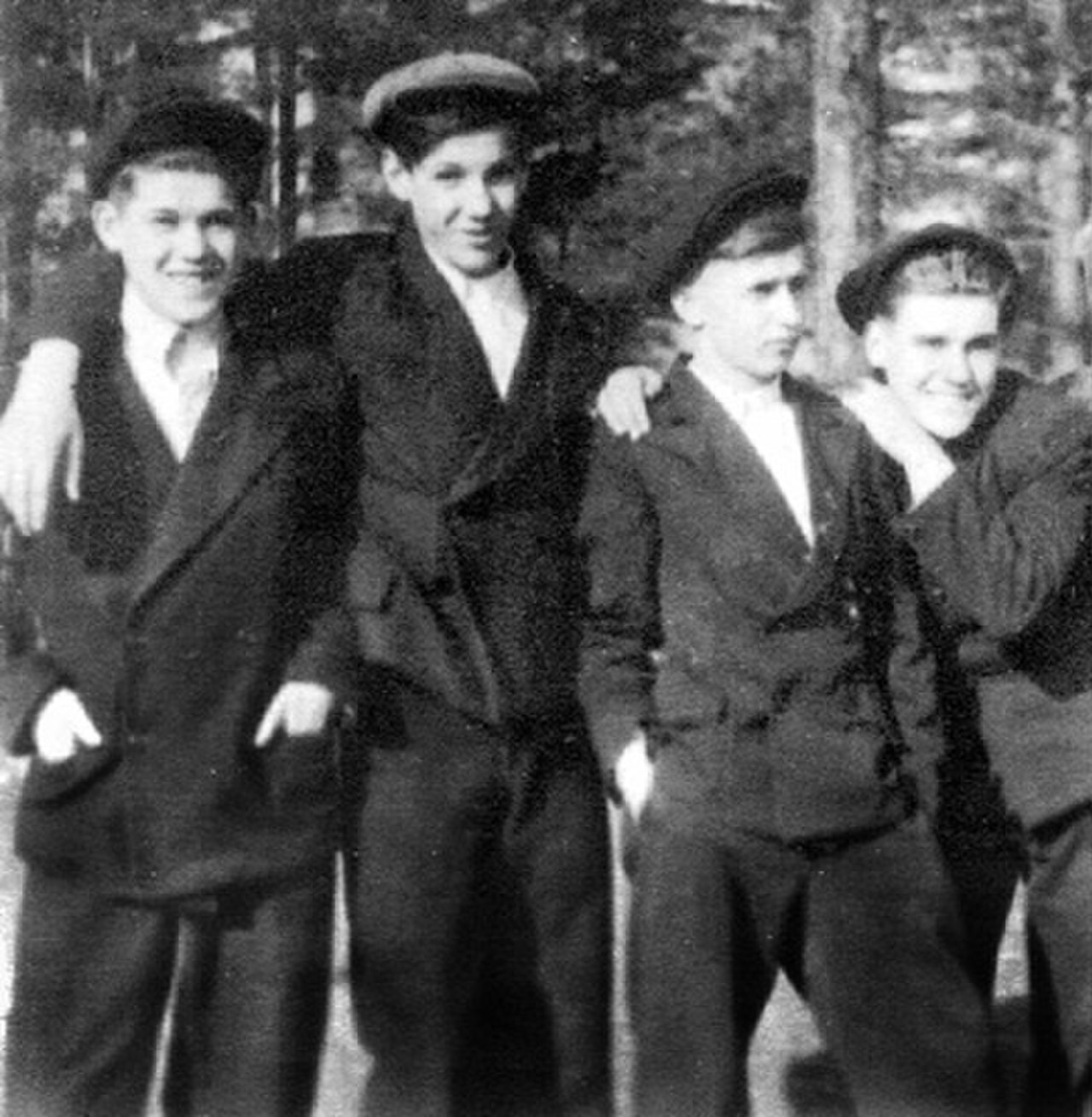
Yeltsin (second from left) with his childhood friends in the 1940s

=== 1931–1948: Childhood and adolescence ===
Boris Nikolayevich Yeltsin was born on 1 February 1931 in Butka, a village in the Ural Oblast, Russian SFSR, Soviet Union. His family, who were ethnic Russians, had lived in this area of the Urals since at least the eighteenth century.

His father, Nikolai Yeltsin, had married his mother, Klavdiya Vasilyevna Starygina, in 1928. Yeltsin always remained closer to his mother than to his father; the latter beat his wife and children on various occasions. The Soviet Union was then under the leadership of Joseph Stalin, who led the one-party state governed by the Communist Party of the Soviet Union (CPSU). Seeking to transform the country into a socialist society according to Marxist–Leninist doctrine, in the late 1920s Stalin's government had initiated a project of mass rural collectivisation coupled with dekulakization. As a prosperous farmer, Yeltsin's paternal grandfather, Ignatii, was accused of being a kulak in 1930. His farm, which was in Basmanovo (also known as Basmanovskoye), was confiscated, and he and his family were forced to reside in a cottage in nearby Butka. There, Nikolai and Ignatii's other children were allowed to join the local kolkhoz (collective farm), but Ignatii himself was not; he and his wife, Anna, were exiled in 1934 to Nadezhdinsk, where he died two years later.

As an infant, Yeltsin was christened in the Russian Orthodox Church; his mother was devout, and his father unobservant. In the years after his birth, the area was hit by the famine of 1932–1933; throughout his childhood, Yeltsin was often hungry. In 1932, Yeltsin's parents moved to Kazan, where Yeltsin attended kindergarten. There, in 1934, the OGPU state security services arrested Nikolai, accused him of anti-Soviet agitation, and sentenced him to three years in the Dmitrov labor camp. Yeltsin and his mother then were ejected from their residence and were taken in by friends; Klavdiya worked at a garment factory in her husband's absence. In October 1936, Nikolai returned; in July 1937, the couple's second child, Mikhail, was born. That month, they moved to Berezniki, in Perm Krai, where Nikolai got work on a potash combine project. In July 1944, they had a third child, Valentina.

Between 1939 and 1945, Yeltsin received a primary education at Berezniki's Railway School Number 95. Academically, he did well at primary school and was repeatedly elected class monitor by fellow pupils. There, he also took part in activities organized by the Komsomol and Vladimir Lenin All-Union Pioneer Organization. This overlapped with Soviet involvement in the Second World War, during which Yeltsin's paternal uncle, Andrian, served in the Red Army and was killed. From 1945 to 1949, Yeltsin studied at the municipal secondary school number 1, also known as Pushkin High School. Yeltsin did well at secondary school, and there took an increasing interest in sports, becoming captain of the school's volleyball squad. He enjoyed playing pranks and in one instance played with a grenade, which blew off the thumb and index finger of his left hand. With friends, he would go on summer walking expeditions in the adjacent taiga, sometimes for many weeks.

=== 1949–1960: University and career in construction ===
In September 1949, Yeltsin was admitted to the Ural Polytechnic Institute (UPI) in Sverdlovsk. He took the stream in industrial and civil engineering, which included courses in maths, physics, materials and soil science, and draftsmanship. He was also required to study Marxist–Leninist doctrine and choose a language course, for which he selected German, although never became adept at it. Tuition was free and he was provided a small stipend to live on, which he supplemented by unloading railway trucks for a small wage. Academically, he achieved high grades, although temporarily dropped out in 1952 when afflicted with tonsillitis and rheumatic fever. He devoted much time to athletics, and joined the UPI volleyball team. He avoided any involvement in political organizations while there. During the summer 1953 break, he traveled across the Soviet Union, touring the Volga, central Russia, Belarus, Ukraine, and Georgia; much of the travel was achieved by hitchhiking on freight trains. It was at UPI that he began a relationship with Naina Iosifovna Girina, a fellow student who would later become his wife. Yeltsin completed his studies in June 1955.

Leaving the Ural Polytechnic Institute, Yeltsin was assigned to work with the Lower Iset Construction Directorate in Sverdlovsk; at his request, he served the first year as a trainee in various building trades. He quickly rose through the organization's ranks. In June 1956 he was promoted to foreman (master), and in June 1957 was promoted again, to the position of work superintendent (prorab). In these positions, he confronted widespread alcoholism and a lack of motivation among construction workers, an irregular supply of materials, and the regular theft or vandalism of available materials. He soon imposed fines for those who damaged or stole materials or engaged in absenteeism, and closely monitored productivity. His work on the construction of a textile factory, for which he oversaw 1000 workers, brought him wider recognition. In June 1958 he became a senior work superintendent (starshii prorab) and in January 1960 was made head engineer (glavni inzhener) of Construction Directorate Number 13.

At the same time, Yeltsin's family was growing; in September 1956, he married Girina. She soon got work at a scientific research institute, where she remained for 29 years. In August 1957, their daughter Yelena was born, followed by a second daughter, Tatyana, in January 1960. During this period, they moved through a succession of apartments. On family holidays, Yeltsin took his family to a lake in northern Russia and the Black Sea coast.

== CPSU career ==
=== 1960–1975: Early membership of the Communist Party ===
In March 1960, Yeltsin became a probationary member of the governing Communist Party and a full member in March 1961. In his later autobiography, he stated that his original reasons for joining were "sincere" and rooted in a genuine belief in the party's socialist ideals. In other interviews he instead stated that he joined because membership was a necessity for career advancement. His career continued to progress during the early 1960s; in February 1962 he was promoted chief (nachal'nik) of the construction directorate. In June 1963, Yeltsin was reassigned to the Sverdlovsk House-Building Combine as its head engineer, and in December 1965 became the combine's director. During this period he was largely involved in building residential housing, the expansion of which was a major priority for the government. He gained a reputation within the construction industry as a hard worker who was punctual and effective and who was used to meeting the targets set forth by the state apparatus. There had been plans to award him the Order of Lenin for his work, although this was scrapped after a five-story building he was constructing collapsed in March 1966. An official investigation found that Yeltsin was not culpable for the accident.

Within the local Communist Party, Yeltsin gained a patron in Yakov Ryabov, who became the first secretary of the party gorkom in 1963. In April 1968, Ryabov decided to recruit Yeltsin into the regional party apparatus, proposing him for a vacancy in the obkom's department for construction. Ryabov ensured that Yeltsin got the job despite objections that he was not a longstanding party member. That year, Yeltsin and his family moved into a four-room apartment on Mamin-Sibiryak Street, downtown Sverdlovsk. Yeltsin then received his second Order of the Red Banner of Labor for his work completing a cold-rolling mill at the Upper Iset Works, a project for which he had overseen the actions of 15,000 laborers. In the late 1960s, Yeltsin was permitted to visit the West for the first time as he was sent on a trip to France. In 1975, Yeltsin was then made one of the five obkom secretaries in the Sverdlovsk Oblast, a position that gave him responsibility not only for construction in the region but also for the forest and the pulp-and-paper industries. Also in 1975, his family relocated to a flat in the House of Old Bolsheviks on March Street.

=== 1976–1985: First Secretary of Sverdlovsk Oblast ===
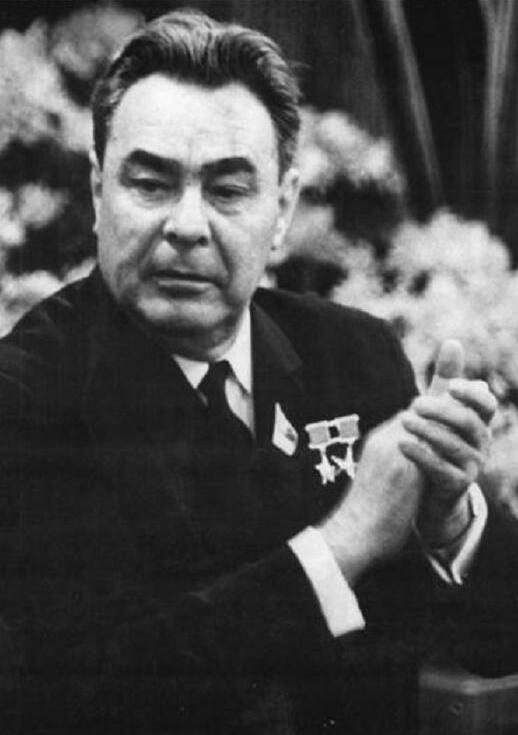
In 1976, Yeltsin was interviewed by Leonid Brezhnev, General Secretary of the Communist Party, who decided that he was an appropriate choice to become First Secretary of the party's Sverdlovsk obkom.

In October 1976, Ryabov was promoted to a new position in Moscow. He recommended that Yeltsin replace him as the First Secretary of the Party Committee in Sverdlovsk Oblast. Leonid Brezhnev, who then led the Soviet Union as General Secretary of the party's Central Committee, interviewed Yeltsin personally to determine his suitability and agreed with Ryabov's assessment. At the Central Committee's recommendation, the Sverdlovsk obkom then unanimously voted to appoint Yeltsin as its first secretary. This made him one of the youngest provincial first secretaries in the Russian SFSR, and gave him significant power within the province.

Where possible, Yeltsin tried to improve consumer welfare in the province, arguing that it would make for more productive workers. Under his provincial leadership, work started on various construction and infrastructure projects in the city of Sverdlovsk, including a subway system, the replacement of its barracks housing, new theaters and a circus, the refurbishment of its 1912 opera house, and youth housing projects to build new homes for young families. In September 1977, Yeltsin carried out orders to demolish the Ipatiev House, the location where the Romanov royal family had been killed in 1918, over the government's fears that it was attracting growing foreign and domestic attention. He was also responsible for punishing those living in the province who wrote or published material that the Soviet government considered to be seditious or damaging to the established order.

Yeltsin sat on the civil-military collegium of the Urals Military District and attended its field exercises. In October 1978, the Ministry of Defence gave him the rank of colonel. Also in 1978, Yeltsin was elected without opposition to the Supreme Soviet. In 1979 Yeltsin and his family moved into a five-room apartment at the Working Youth Embankment in Sverdlovsk. In February 1981, Yeltsin gave a speech to the 26th CPSU Congress and on the final day of the Congress was selected to join the Communist Party Central Committee.

Yeltsin's reports to party meetings reflected the ideological conformity that was expected within the authoritarian state. Yeltsin played along with the personality cult surrounding Brezhnev, but he was contemptuous of what he saw as the Soviet leader's vanity and sloth. He later claimed to have quashed plans for a Brezhnev museum in Sverdlovsk. While First Secretary, his world-view began to shift, influenced by his reading; he kept up with a wide range of journals published in the country and also claimed to have read an illegally printed samizdat copy of Aleksandr Solzhenitsyn's The Gulag Archipelago. Many of his concerns about the Soviet system were prosaic rather than ideological, as he believed that the system was losing effectiveness and beginning to decay. He was increasingly faced with the problem of Russia's place within the Soviet Union; unlike other republics in the country, the RSFSR lacked the same levels of autonomy from the central government in Moscow. In the early 1980s, he and Yurii Petrov privately devised a tripartite scheme for reforming the Soviet Union that would involve strengthening the Russian government, but it was never presented publicly.

By 1980, Yeltsin had developed the habit of appearing unannounced in factories, shops, and public transport to get a closer look at the realities of Soviet life. In May 1981, he held a question-and-answer session with college students at the Sverdlovsk Youth Palace, where he was unusually frank in his discussion of the country's problems. In December 1982 he then gave a television broadcast for the region in which he responded to various letters. This personalised approach to interacting with the public brought disapproval from some Communist Party figures, such as First Secretary of Tyumen Oblast, Gennadii Bogomyakov, although the Central Committee showed no concern. In 1981, he was awarded the Order of Lenin for his work. The following year, Brezhnev died and was succeeded by Yuri Andropov, who in turn ruled for 15 months before his own death; Yeltsin spoke positively about Andropov. Andropov was succeeded by another short-lived leader, Konstantin Chernenko. After his death, Yeltsin took part in the Central Committee plenum which appointed Mikhail Gorbachev the new General Secretary of the Communist Party of the Soviet Union, and thus de facto Soviet leader, in March 1985.

=== 1985: Relocation to Moscow to become Head of Gorkom ===
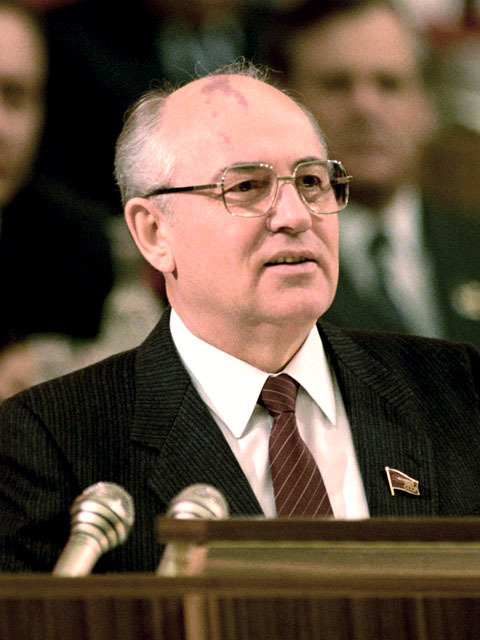
Mikhail Gorbachev took office as the General Secretary of the Communist Party in 1985; he soon promoted Yeltsin to a job in Moscow.

Gorbachev was interested in reforming the Soviet Union and, at the urging of Yegor Ligachyov, the organizational secretary of the Central Committee, soon summoned Yeltsin to meet with him as a potential ally in his efforts. Yeltsin had some reservations about Gorbachev as a leader, deeming him controlling and patronizing, but committed himself to the latter's project of reform. In April 1985, Gorbachev appointed Yeltsin head of the Construction Department of the Party's Central Committee. Although it entailed moving to the capital city, Yeltsin was unhappy with what he regarded as a demotion. There, he was issued a nomenklatura flat at 54 Second Tverskaya-Yamskaya Street, where his daughter Tatyana and her son and husband soon joined him and his wife. Gorbachev soon promoted Yeltsin to secretary of the Central Committee for construction and capital investment, a position within the powerful CPSU Central Committee Secretariat, a move approved by the Central Committee plenum in July 1985.

With Gorbachev's support, in December 1985, Yeltsin was installed as the first secretary of the Moscow gorkom of the CPSU. He was now responsible for managing the Soviet capital city, which had a population of 8.7 million. In February 1986, Yeltsin became a candidate (non-voting) member of the Politburo. At that point he formally left the Secretariat to concentrate on his role in Moscow. Over the coming year he removed many of the old secretaries of the gorkom, replacing them with younger individuals, particularly with backgrounds in factory management. In August 1986, Yeltsin gave a two-hour report to the party conference in which he talked about Moscow's problems, including issues that had previously not been spoken about publicly. Gorbachev described the speech as a "strong fresh wind" for the party. Yeltsin expressed a similar message at the 27th Congress of the CPSU in February 1986 and then in a speech at the House of Political Enlightenment in April.

=== 1987: Resignation ===
On 10 September 1987, after a lecture from hard-liner Yegor Ligachyov at the Politburo for allowing two small unsanctioned demonstrations on Moscow streets, Yeltsin wrote a letter of resignation to Gorbachev who was holidaying on the Black Sea. When Gorbachev received the letter he was stunned – nobody in Soviet history had voluntarily resigned from the ranks of the Politburo. Gorbachev phoned Yeltsin and asked him to reconsider.

On 27 October 1987 at the plenary meeting of the Central Committee of the CPSU, Yeltsin, frustrated that Gorbachev had not addressed any of the issues outlined in his resignation letter, asked to speak. He expressed his discontent with the slow pace of reform in society, the servility shown to the general secretary, and opposition to him from Ligachyov making his position untenable. He then requested that he be allowed to resign from the Politburo, adding that the City Committee would decide whether he should resign from the post of First Secretary of the Moscow Communist Party. Aside from the fact that no one had ever quit the Politburo before, no one in the party had addressed a leader of the party in such a manner in front of the Central Committee since Leon Trotsky in the 1920s. In his reply, Gorbachev accused Yeltsin of "political immaturity" and "absolute irresponsibility". Nobody in the Central Committee backed Yeltsin.

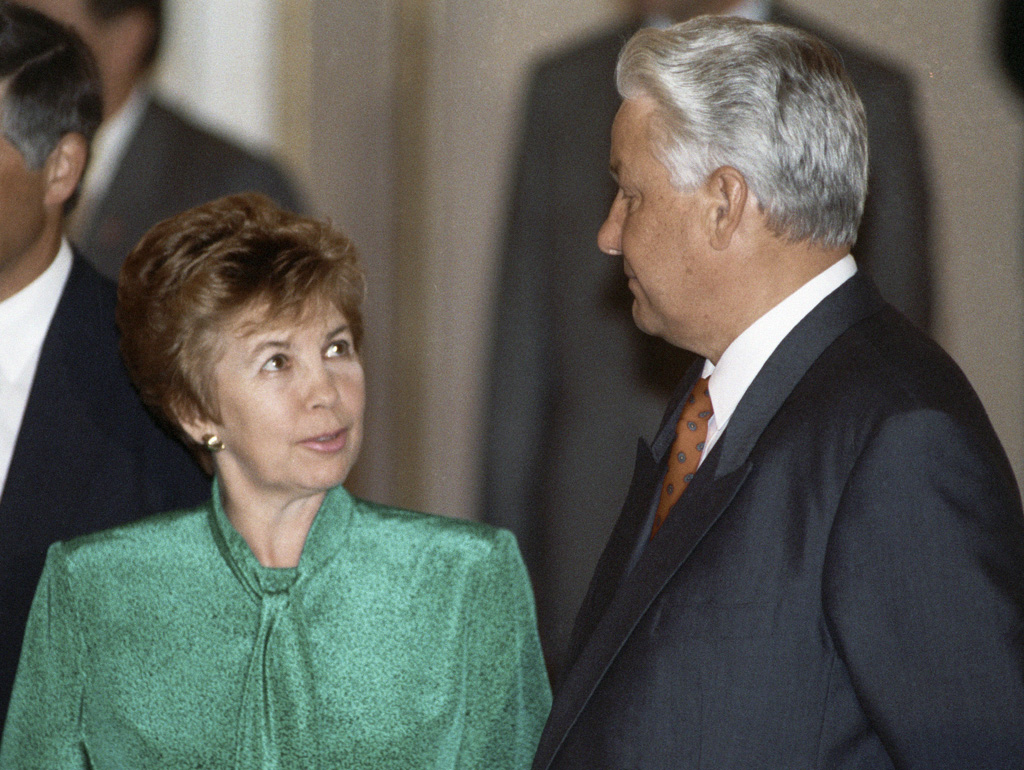
Yeltsin with Raisa Gorbacheva

Within days, news of Yeltsin's actions leaked and rumors of his "secret speech" at the Central Committee spread throughout Moscow. Soon, fabricated samizdat versions began to circulate – this was the beginning of Yeltsin's rise as a rebel and growth in popularity as an anti-establishment figure. Gorbachev called a meeting of the Moscow City Party Committee for 11 November 1987 to launch another crushing attack on Yeltsin and confirm his dismissal. On 9 November 1987, Yeltsin apparently tried to kill himself and was rushed to the hospital bleeding profusely from self-inflicted cuts to his chest. Gorbachev ordered the injured Yeltsin from his hospital bed to the Moscow party plenum two days later where he was ritually denounced by the party faithful in what was reminiscent of a Stalinist show trial before he was fired from the post of First Secretary of the Moscow Communist Party. Yeltsin said he would never forgive Gorbachev for this "immoral and inhuman" treatment.

Yeltsin was demoted to the position of First Deputy Commissioner for the State Committee for Construction. At the next meeting of the Central Committee on 24 February 1988, Yeltsin was removed from his position as a Candidate member of the Politburo. He was perturbed and humiliated but began plotting his revenge. His opportunity came with Gorbachev's establishment of the Congress of People's Deputies. Yeltsin recovered and started intensively criticizing Gorbachev, highlighting the slow pace of reform in the Soviet Union as his major argument.

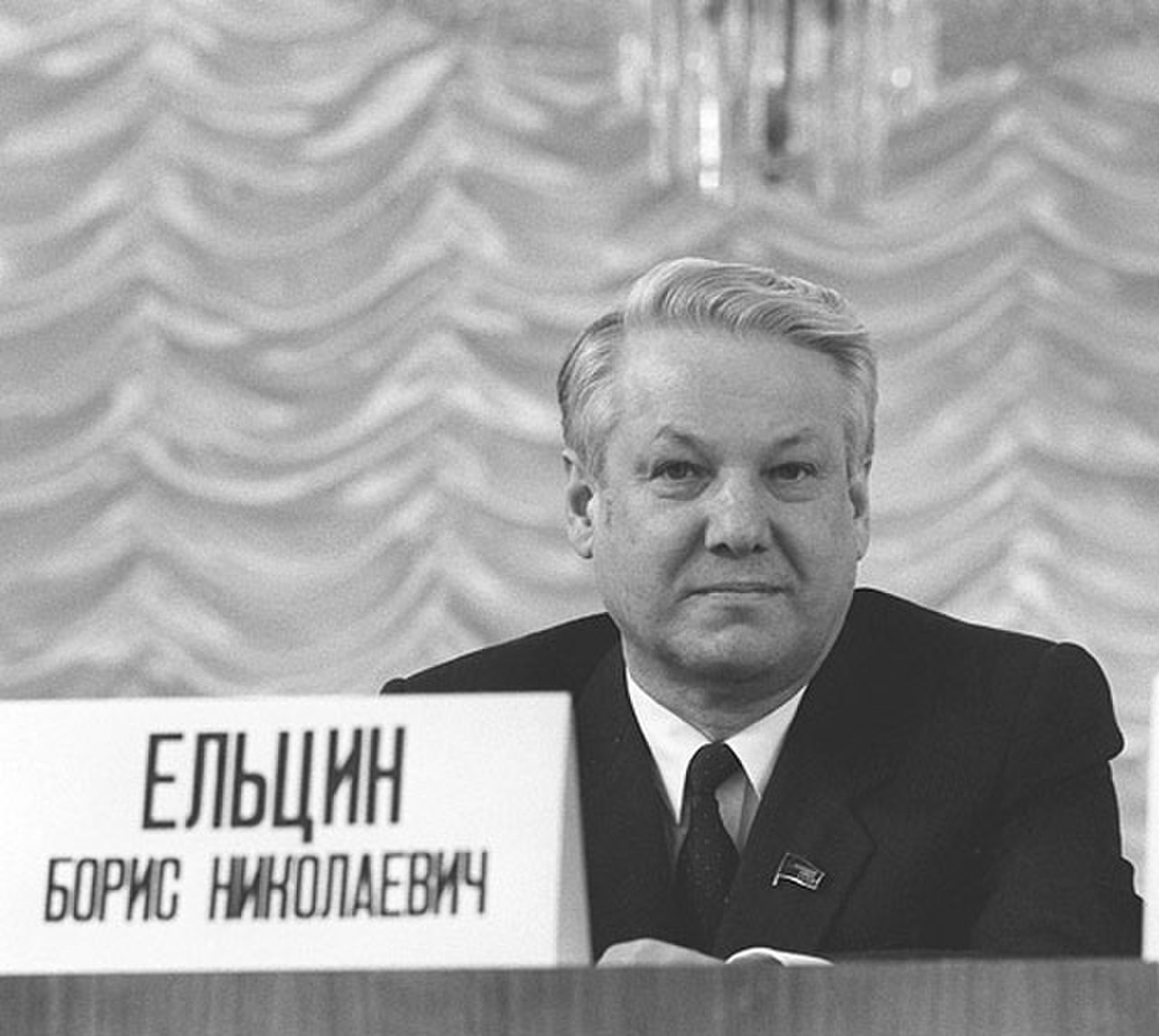
Yeltsin as candidate for the Congress of People's Deputies in 1989

Yeltsin's criticism of the Politburo and Gorbachev led to a smear campaign against him, in which examples of Yeltsin's awkward behavior were used against him. Speaking at the CPSU conference in 1988, Yegor Ligachyov stated, "Boris, you are wrong". An article in Pravda described Yeltsin as drunk at a lecture during his visit to the United States in September 1989, an allegation which appeared to be confirmed by a TV account of his speech; however, popular dissatisfaction with the regime was strong, and these attempts to smear Yeltsin only added to his popularity. In another incident, Yeltsin fell from a bridge. Commenting on this event, Yeltsin hinted that he was helped to fall by the enemies of perestroika, but his opponents suggested that he was simply drunk.

Between 1988 and 1991, Yeltsin established himself as the hero of the anti-communist opposition in the Soviet Union. On 26 March 1989, Yeltsin was elected to the Congress of People's Deputies of the Soviet Union as the delegate from Moscow district with 92% of the vote, and on 29 May 1989, he was elected by the Congress of People's Deputies to a seat on the Supreme Soviet of the Soviet Union. On 19 July 1989, Yeltsin announced the formation of the radical pro-reform faction in the Congress of People's Deputies, the Inter-Regional Group of Deputies, and on 29 July 1989 was elected one of the five co-chairmen of the Inter-Regional Group. Following these victories, Yeltsin became a renowned leader with a reputation as an anti-communist revolutionary.

On 16 September 1989, during a tour of the United States, Yeltsin toured a medium-sized grocery store (Randalls) in Texas. Leon Aron, quoting a Yeltsin associate, wrote in his 2000 biography, Yeltsin, A Revolutionary Life (St. Martin's Press): "For a long time, on the plane to Miami, he sat motionless, his head in his hands. 'What have they done to our poor people?' he said after a long silence." He added, "On his return to Moscow, Yeltsin would confess the pain he had felt after the Houston excursion: the 'pain for all of us, for our country so rich, so talented and so exhausted by incessant experiments'." He wrote that Mr. Yeltsin added, "I think we have committed a crime against our people by making their standard of living so incomparably lower than that of the Americans." An aide, Lev Sukhanov, was reported to have said that it was at that moment that "the last vestige of Bolshevism collapsed" inside his boss. In his autobiography, Against the Grain: An Autobiography, written and published in 1990, Yeltsin hinted in a small passage that after his tour, he made plans to open his line of grocery stores and planned to fill it with government-subsidized goods to alleviate the country's problems.

== Presidency of the Russian Soviet Federative Socialist Republic (1990–1991) ==
On 4 March 1990, Yeltsin was elected to the Congress of People's Deputies of Russia representing Sverdlovsk with 72% of the vote. On 29 May 1990, he was elected chairman of the Supreme Soviet of the Russian Soviet Federative Socialist Republic (RSFSR), although Gorbachev personally pleaded with the Russian deputies not to select Yeltsin.

A part of this power struggle was the opposition between the power structures of the Soviet Union and the RSFSR. In an attempt to gain more power, on 12 June 1990, the Congress of People's Deputies of the RSFSR adopted a declaration of sovereignty. On 12 July 1990, Yeltsin resigned from the CPSU in a dramatic speech before party members at the 28th Congress of the Communist Party of the Soviet Union, some of whom responded by shouting "Shame!"

=== 1991: Presidential election ===
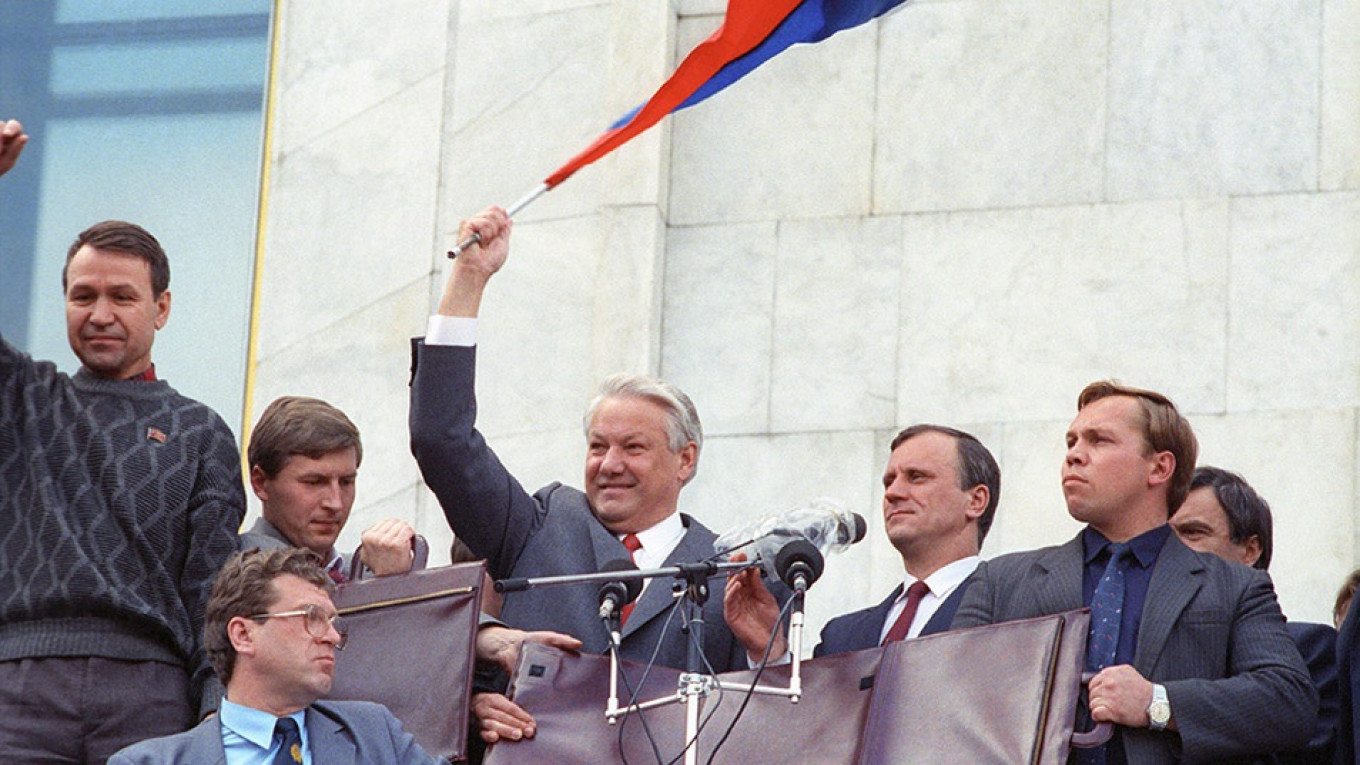
Yeltsin on 22 August 1991

During May 1991 Václav Havel invited Yeltsin to Prague where the latter unambiguously condemned the Soviet intervention in 1968.

On 12 June Yeltsin won 57% of the popular vote in the democratic presidential elections for the Russian republic, defeating Gorbachev's preferred candidate, Nikolai Ryzhkov, who got just 16% of the vote, and four other candidates. In his election campaign, Yeltsin criticized the "dictatorship of the center", but did not suggest the introduction of a market economy. Instead, he said that he would put his head on the railtrack in the event of increased prices. Yeltsin took office on 10 July, and reappointed Ivan Silayev as Chairman of the Council of Ministers of the Russian SFSR.

On 18 August 1991, a coup against Gorbachev was launched by the government members opposed to perestroika. Gorbachev was held in Crimea while Yeltsin raced to the White House of Russia (residence of the Supreme Soviet of the RSFSR) in Moscow to defy the coup, making a memorable speech from atop the turret of a tank onto which he had climbed. The White House was surrounded by the military, but the troops defected in the face of mass popular demonstrations. By 21 August most of the coup leaders had fled Moscow and Gorbachev was "rescued" from Crimea and then returned to Moscow. Yeltsin was subsequently hailed by his supporters around the world for rallying mass opposition to the coup.

Although restored to his position, Gorbachev had been destroyed politically. Neither union nor Russian power structures heeded his commands as support had swung over to Yeltsin. By September, Gorbachev could no longer influence events outside of Moscow. Taking advantage of the situation, Yeltsin began taking over what remained of the Soviet government, ministry by ministry—including the Kremlin. On 6 November 1991, Yeltsin issued a decree banning all Communist Party activities on Russian soil. In early December 1991, Ukraine voted for independence from the Soviet Union. A week later, on 8 December, Yeltsin met Ukrainian president Leonid Kravchuk and the leader of Belarus, Stanislav Shushkevich, in Belovezhskaya Pushcha. In the Belovezha Accords, the three presidents declared that the Soviet Union no longer existed "as a subject of international law and geopolitical reality", and announced the formation of a voluntary Commonwealth of Independent States (CIS) in its place.

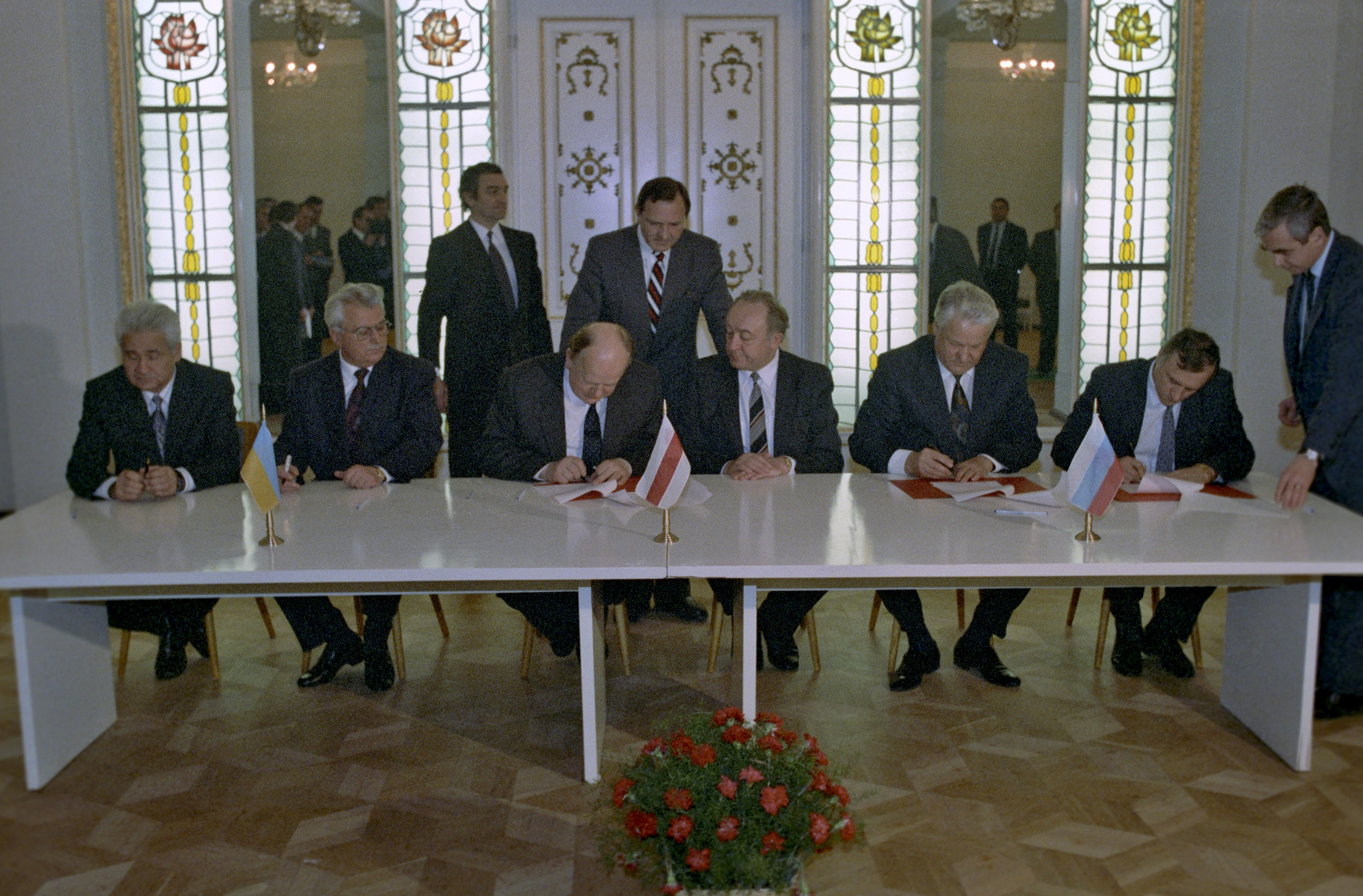
Leaders of the Soviet Republics sign the Belovezha Accords.

On 17 December, in a meeting with Yeltsin, Gorbachev accepted the fait accompli and agreed to dissolve the Soviet Union. On 24 December, by mutual agreement of the other CIS states (which by this time included all of the remaining republics except Georgia), the Russian Federation took the Soviet Union's seat in the United Nations. The next day, Gorbachev resigned and handed the functions of his office to Yeltsin. On 26 December, the Council of the Republics, the upper house of the Supreme Soviet, voted the Soviet Union out of existence, thereby ending the world's oldest, largest and most powerful Communist state. Economic relations between the former Soviet republics were severely compromised. Millions of ethnic Russians found themselves in newly formed foreign countries.

Initially, Yeltsin promoted the retention of national borders according to the pre-existing Soviet state borders, although this left ethnic Russians as a majority in parts of northern Kazakhstan, eastern Ukraine, and areas of Estonia and Latvia.

== Presidency of independent Russia (1991–1999) ==
=== 1991–1996: First term ===
==== Radical reforms ====
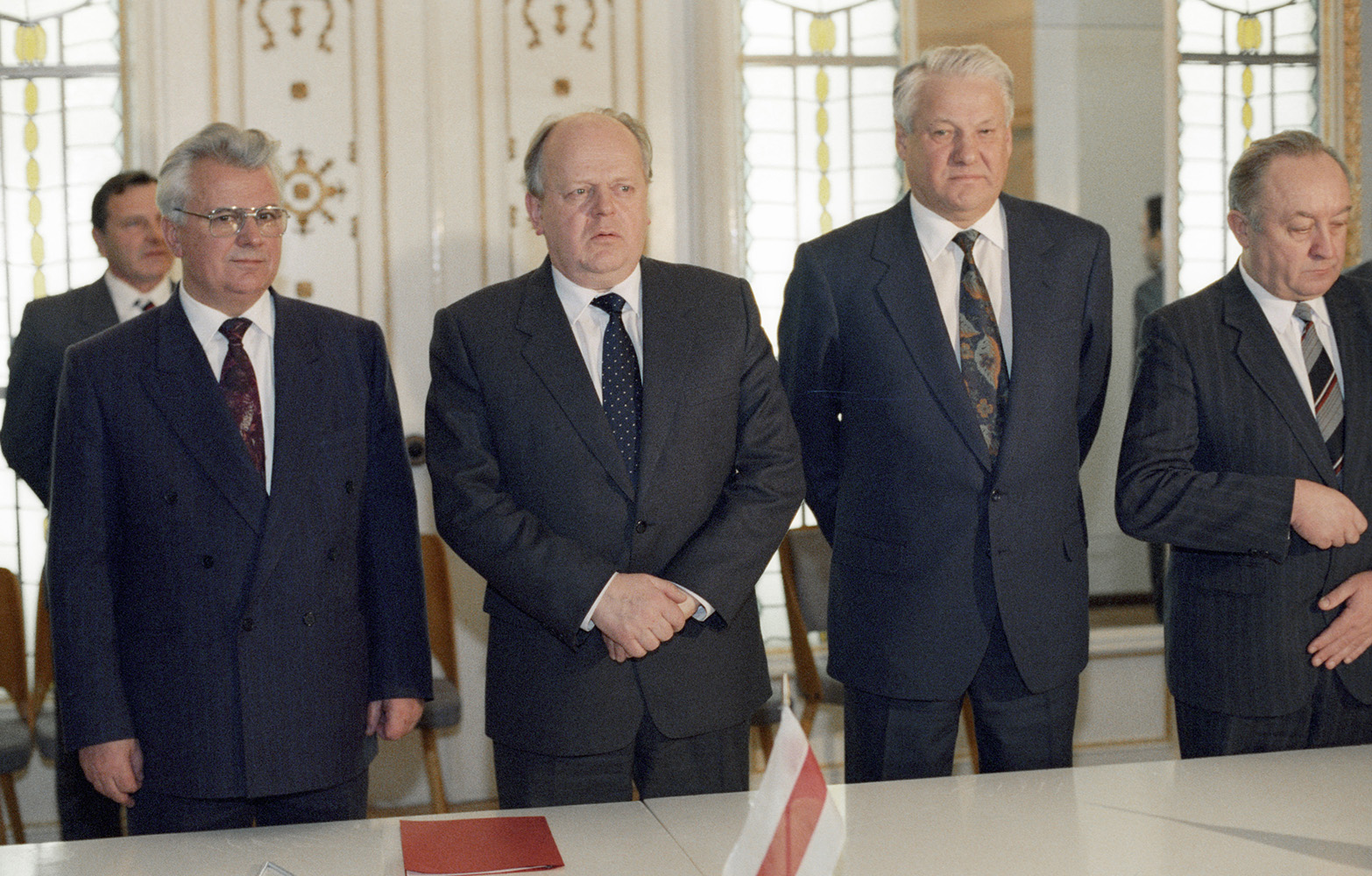
Yeltsin shortly after signing the Belovezha Accords with Leonid Kravchuk and Stanislav Shushkevich, 8 December 1991

Just days after the dissolution of the Soviet Union, Yeltsin resolved to embark on a programme of radical economic reform. Surpassing Gorbachev's reforms, which sought to expand democracy in the socialist system, the new regime aimed to completely dismantle socialism and fully implement capitalism, converting the world's largest command economy into a free-market one. During early discussions of this transition, Yeltsin's advisers debated issues of speed and sequencing, with an apparent division between those favoring a rapid approach and those favoring a gradual or slower approach. On 1 February 1992, Yeltsin signed accords with U.S. president George H. W. Bush, declaring the Cold War officially over after nearly 47 years. A visit to Moscow from Havel in April 1992 occasioned the written repudiation of the Soviet intervention and the withdrawal of armed forces from Czechoslovakia. Yeltsin laid a wreath during a November 1992 ceremony in Budapest, apologized for the 1956 Soviet intervention in Hungary and handed over to president Árpád Göncz documents from the Communist Party and KGB archives related to the intervention. A treaty of friendship was signed in May 1992 with Lech Wałęsa's Poland, and then another one in August 1992 with Zhelyu Zhelev's Bulgaria.

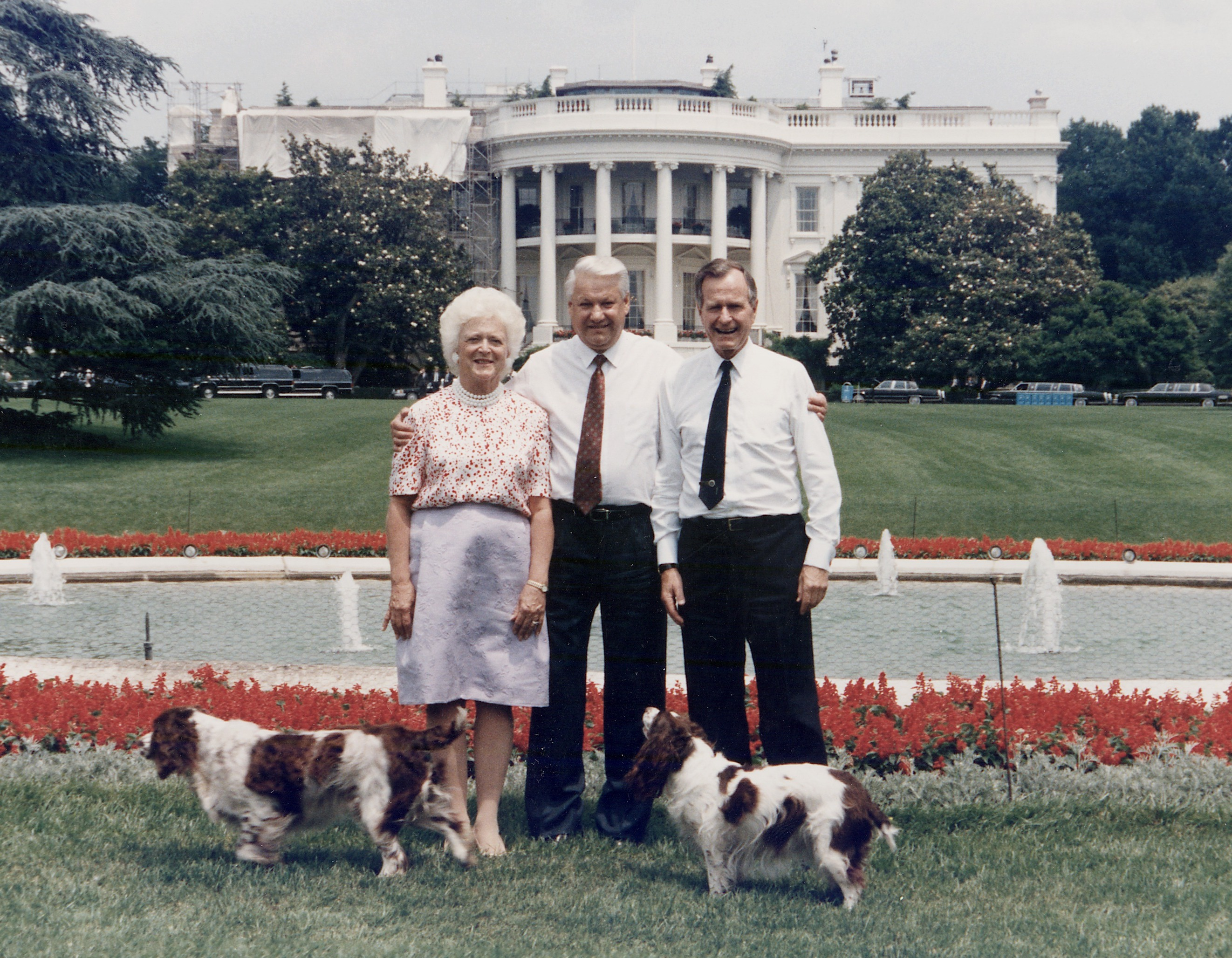
Yeltsin with U.S. president George H. W. Bush and First Lady Barbara Bush at the White House, Washington, D.C., 1992

On 2 January 1992, Yeltsin, acting as his own prime minister, began a major economic and administrative reform, ordering the liberalization of foreign trade, prices, and currency. At the same time, Yeltsin followed a policy of "macroeconomic stabilization", a harsh austerity regime designed to control inflation. Under Yeltsin's stabilization programme, interest rates were raised to extremely high levels to tighten money and restrict credit. To bring state spending and revenues into balance, Yeltsin raised new taxes heavily, cut back sharply on government subsidies to industry and construction, and made steep cuts to state welfare spending.

In early 1992, prices skyrocketed throughout Russia, and a deep credit crunch shut down many industries and brought about a protracted depression. The reforms devastated the living standards of much of the population, especially the groups dependent on Soviet-era state subsidies and welfare programs. Through the 1990s, Russia's GDP fell by 50%, vast sectors of the economy were wiped out, inequality and unemployment grew dramatically, whilst incomes fell. Hyperinflation, caused by the Central Bank of Russia's loose monetary policy, wiped out many people's personal savings, and tens of millions of Russians were plunged into poverty.

Most of Yeltsin's time as president was plagued by economic contraction.

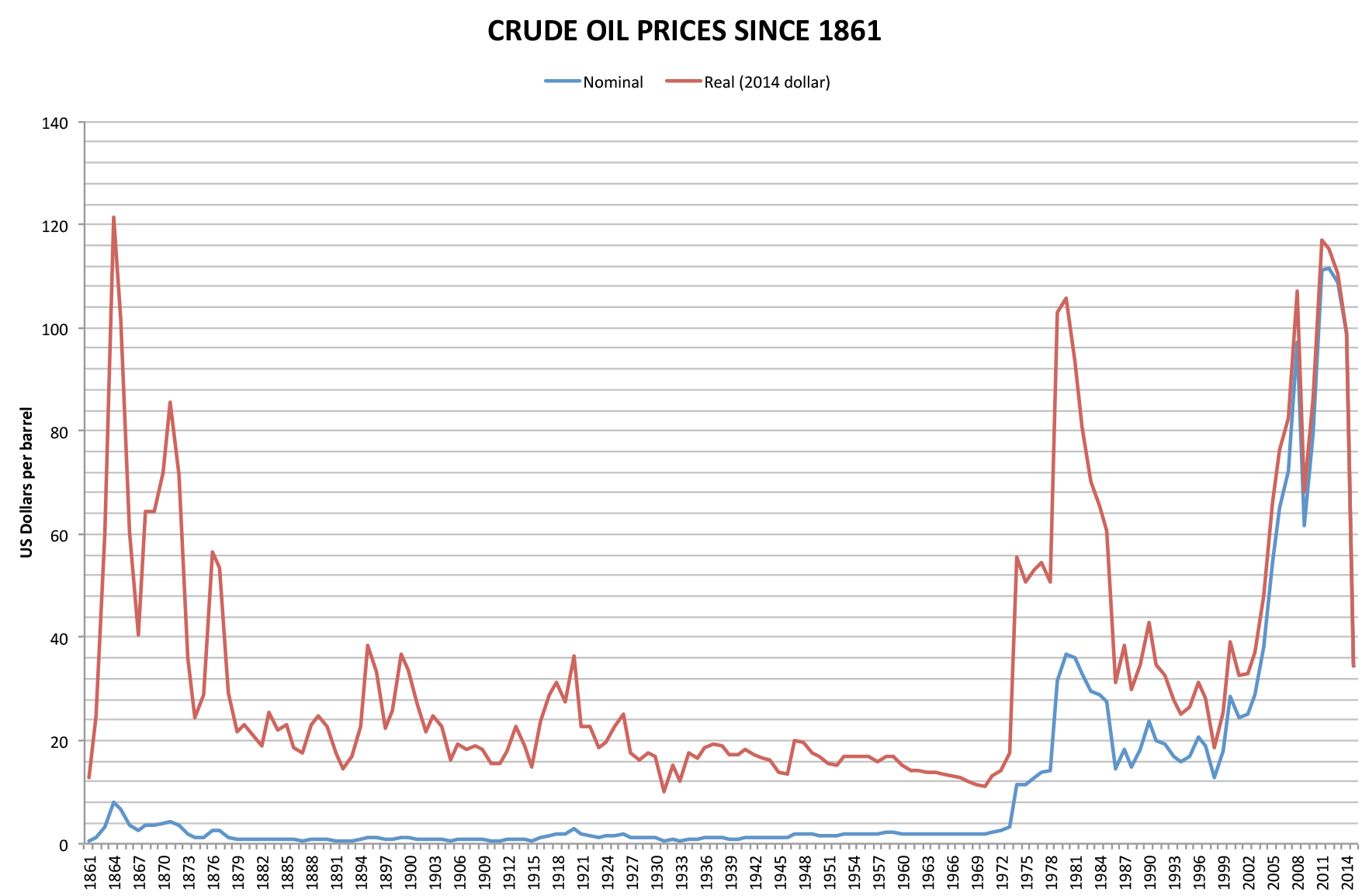
Crude oil prices continued to fall during the 1990s, following the trend during the late 1980s.

Some economists argue that in the 1990s, Russia suffered an economic downturn more severe than the United States or Germany had undergone six decades earlier in the Great Depression. Russian commentators and even some Western economists, such as Marshall Goldman, widely blamed Yeltsin's economic programme for the country's disastrous economic performance in the 1990s. Many politicians began to quickly distance themselves from the programme. In February 1992, Russia's vice president, Alexander Rutskoy denounced the Yeltsin programme as "economic genocide". By 1993, conflict over the reform direction escalated between Yeltsin on the one side, and the opposition to radical economic reform in Russia's parliament on the other.

Reporter Fred Kaplan, who served as the Moscow Bureau chief of the Boston Globe from 1992 to 1995, noted that when he arrived in Moscow and tried to find places where bottom-up democracy was being built, soon discovered that there weren't any: despite press freedoms, Yeltsin's government had remained top-down.

==== Confrontation with parliament ====
Throughout 1992 Yeltsin wrestled with the Supreme Soviet of Russia and the Congress of People's Deputies for control over government, government policy, government banking, and property. In 1992, the speaker of the Russian Supreme Soviet, Ruslan Khasbulatov, came out in opposition to the reforms, despite claiming to support Yeltsin's overall goals. In December 1992, the 7th Congress of People's Deputies succeeded in turning down the Yeltsin-backed candidacy of Yegor Gaidar for the position of Russian prime minister. An agreement was brokered by Valery Zorkin, president of the Constitutional Court, which included the following provisions: a national referendum on the new constitution; parliament and Yeltsin would choose a new head of government, to be confirmed by the Supreme Soviet; and the parliament was to cease making constitutional amendments that change the balance of power between the legislative and executive branches. Eventually, on 14 December, Viktor Chernomyrdin, widely seen as a compromise figure, was confirmed in the office.

The conflict escalated soon, however, with the parliament changing its prior decision to hold a referendum. Yeltsin, in turn, announced in a televised address to the nation on 20 March 1993, that he was going to assume certain "special powers" to implement his programme of reforms. In response, the hastily called 9th Congress of People's Deputies of Russia attempted to remove Yeltsin from the presidency through impeachment on 26 March 1993. Yeltsin's opponents gathered more than 600 votes for impeachment but fell 72 votes short of the required two-thirds majority.

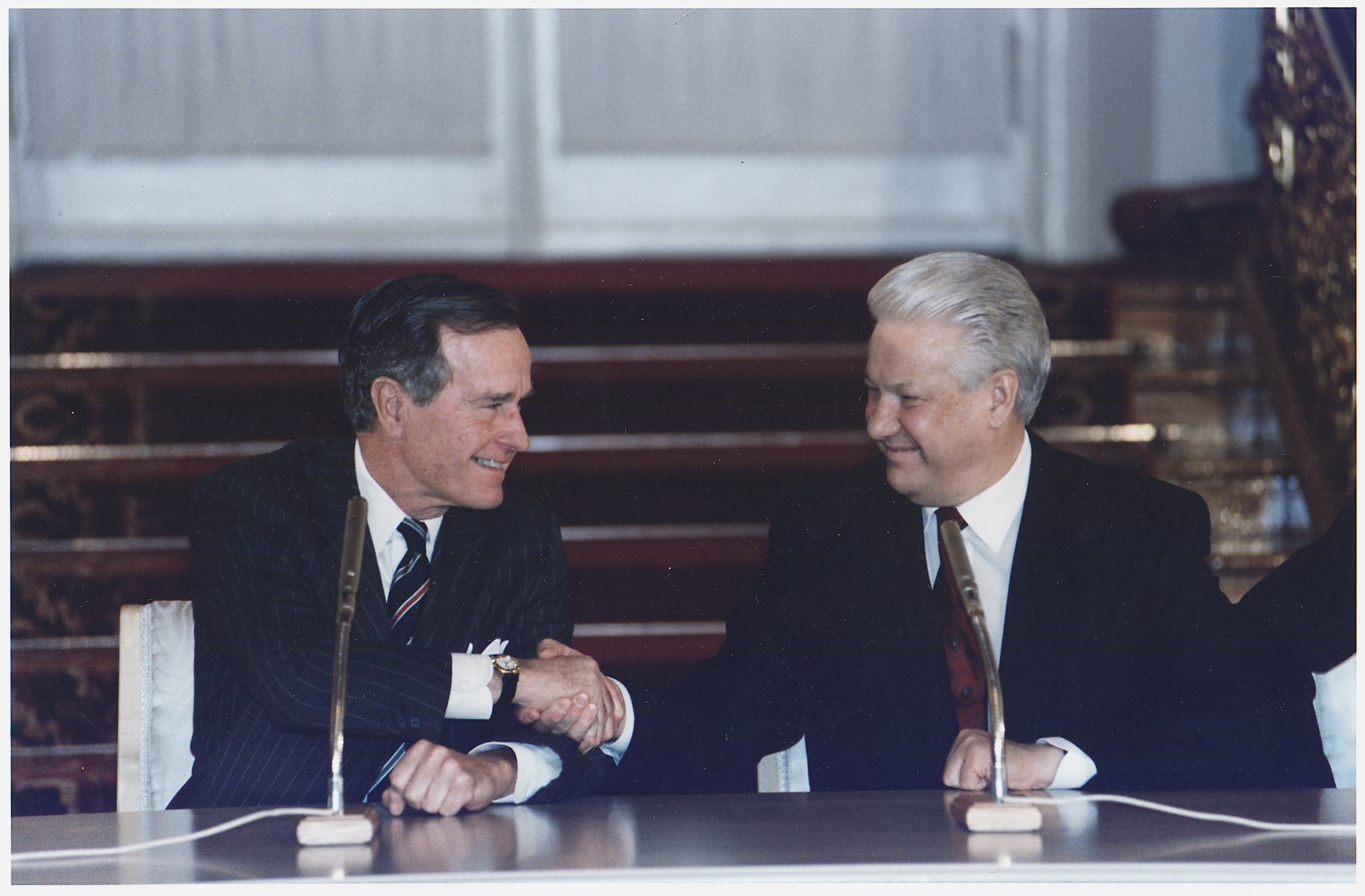
Yeltsin during the signature ceremony of the START II in Moscow, 3 January 1993

During the summer of 1993, a situation of dual power developed in Russia. From July, two separate administrations of the Chelyabinsk Oblast functioned side by side, after Yeltsin refused to accept the newly elected pro-parliament head of the region. The Supreme Soviet pursued its foreign policies, passing a declaration on the status of Sevastopol. In August, a commentator reflected on the situation as follows: "The President issues decrees as if there were no Supreme Soviet, and the Supreme Soviet suspends decrees as if there were no President." (Izvestia, 13 August 1993).

On 21 September 1993, in breach of the constitution, Yeltsin announced in a televised address his decision to disband the Supreme Soviet and Congress of People's Deputies by decree. In his address, Yeltsin declared his intent to rule by decree until the election of the new parliament and a referendum on a new constitution, triggering the constitutional crisis of October 1993. On the night after Yeltsin's televised address, the Supreme Soviet declared Yeltsin removed from the presidency for breaching the constitution, and Vice-president Alexander Rutskoy was sworn in as acting president.

Between 21 and 24 September, Yeltsin was confronted by popular unrest. Demonstrators protested the terrible living conditions under Yeltsin. Since 1989, GDP had declined by half. Corruption was rampant, violent crime was skyrocketing, medical services were collapsing, food and fuel were increasingly scarce and life expectancy was falling for all but a tiny handful of the population; moreover, Yeltsin was increasingly getting the blame. By early October, Yeltsin had secured the support of Russian Armed Forces and Ministry of Internal Affairs. In a massive show of force, Yeltsin called up tanks to shell the Russian White House (parliament building). The attack killed 187 people and wounded almost 500 others.

As the Supreme Soviet was dissolved, elections to the newly established parliament, the State Duma, were held in December 1993. Candidates associated with Yeltsin's economic policies were overwhelmed by a huge anti-Yeltsin vote, the bulk of which was divided between the Communist Party and ultra-nationalists. However, the referendum held at the same time approved the new constitution, which significantly expanded the powers of the president, giving Yeltsin the right to appoint the members of the government, to dismiss the prime minister and, in some cases, to dissolve the Duma. This led to the de facto establishment of a super-presidential system.

==== Relations with China ====
Boris Yeltsin initially prioritized relations with the West, paying little attention to relations with China. During a visit to China, Russian foreign minister Andrei Kozyrev criticized China's human rights policies. Russia also moved to strengthen unofficial ties with Taiwan. The CCP in turn considered Yeltsin as a traitor and anti-communist, but decided to maintain pragmatic ties; a leaked Politburo meeting in January 1992 said that "Even if Yeltsin is very reactionary we can internally curse him and pray for his downfall, but we shall still have to maintain normal state relations with him".

By summer of 1992, Yeltsin started pursuing a less pro-Western foreign policy. China invited Yeltsin to visit China in March 1992. On 23 December 1992, Yeltsin made his first official visit to China, where he met with CCP general secretary Jiang Zemin and Chinese president Yang Shangkun. Former leader Deng Xiaoping refused to meet with Yeltsin. Yeltsin and Yang announced a joint declaration, which said that China and Russia were "friendly countries" and "good-neighborly and mutually beneficial". Yeltsin also noted that "the ideological barrier" had been removed. The two countries also signed twenty-five documents ranging from cooperation in technology to space exploration.

During the 1990s, cooperation between China and Russia was facilitated by the two countries' mutual desires to balance the influence of the United States and establish a multi-polar international system. Yeltsin moved Russian foreign policy towards one that balanced the East and the West, while Russian foreign policy discussions were divided on liberals that favored more alignment with the West and Eurasianists that sought closer ties with China. Tensions between Russia and NATO also contributed to Yeltsin's shift towards China. The relationship between the two countries were upgraded from "friendly countries" to a "constructive partnership" in September 1994, and was further upgraded to a "strategic partnership of equality and mutual trust for the 21st century" in April 1996.

==== Relations with NATO ====
The U.S. Department of State seemed to confuse Yeltsin over German re-unification and dismemberment of the Helsinki Final Act and ensuing Partnership for Peace (PfP) push for NATO expansion. There is some question as to the involvement of his Minister of Foreign Affairs Andrei Kozyrev, who in August 1993 was painted by Lech Wałęsa as a saboteur of Polish aspirations for NATO membership but was regarded by domestic opponents as suborned by the United States. In Yeltsin's letter to Bill Clinton dated 15 September 1993 he strongly favored "a pan-European security system" instead of NATO and warned:

Not only the opposition, but moderate circles as well [in Russia], would no doubt perceive this as a sort of neo-isolation of our country in diametric opposition to its natural admission into Euro-Atlantic space.

After his August visit to Warsaw, Yeltsin saw the explosion of fright over NATO in the old guard and thereafter the window of détente slammed shut. By December 1994, the month in which the Budapest Memorandum was signed, Clinton began to understand that Russia had concluded he was "subordinating, if not abandoning, integration [of Russia] to NATO expansion". In July 1995, by which time the Russians had signed up to PfP, Yeltsin said to Clinton, "we must stick to our position, which is that there should be no rapid expansion of NATO.. it's important that the OSCE be the principal mechanism for developing a new security order in Europe. NATO is a factor, too, of course, but NATO should evolve into a political[-only] organization."

==== Chechnya ====
In December 1994, Yeltsin ordered the military invasion of Chechnya in an attempt to restore Moscow's control over the republic. Nearly two years later, Yeltsin withdrew federal forces from the devastated Chechnya under a 1996 peace agreement brokered by Alexander Lebed, Yeltsin's then-security chief. The peace deal allowed Chechnya greater autonomy but not full independence. The decision to launch the war in Chechnya dismayed many in the West. Time magazine wrote:

Then, what was to be made of Boris Yeltsin? He could no longer be regarded as the democratic hero of Western myth. But had he become an old-style communist boss, turning his back on the democratic reformers he once championed and throwing in his lot with militarists and ultranationalists? Or was he a befuddled, out-of-touch chief being manipulated, knowingly or unwittingly, by—well, by whom exactly? If there were to be a dictatorial coup, would Yeltsin be its victim or its leader?

==== Norwegian rocket incident ====
In 1995, a Black Brant sounding rocket launched from the Andøya Space Center caused a high alert in Russia, known as the Norwegian rocket incident. The Russians were alerted that it might be a nuclear missile launched from an American submarine. The incident occurred in the post-Cold War era, where many Russians were still very suspicious of the United States and NATO. A full alert was passed up through the military chain of command to Yeltsin, who was notified and the "nuclear briefcase" (known in Russia as Cheget) used to authorize nuclear launch was automatically activated. Russian satellites indicated that no massive attack was underway and he agreed with advisors that it was a false alarm.

==== Privatization and the rise of "the oligarchs" ====
Yeltsin and Bill Clinton share a laugh in October 1995.

Following the dissolution of the Soviet Union, Yeltsin promoted privatization as a way of spreading ownership of shares in former state enterprises as widely as possible to create political support for his economic reforms. In the West, privatization was viewed as the key to the transition from Communism in Eastern Europe, ensuring a quick dismantling of the Soviet-era command economy to make way for "free market reforms". In the early 1990s, Anatoly Chubais, Yeltsin's deputy for economic policy, emerged as a leading advocate of privatization in Russia.

In late 1992, Yeltsin launched a programme of free vouchers as a way to give mass privatization a jump-start. Under the programme, all Russian citizens were issued vouchers, each with a nominal value of around 10,000 rubles, for the purchase of shares of select state enterprises. Although each citizen initially received a voucher of equal face value, within months the majority of them converged in the hands of intermediaries who were ready to buy them for cash right away.

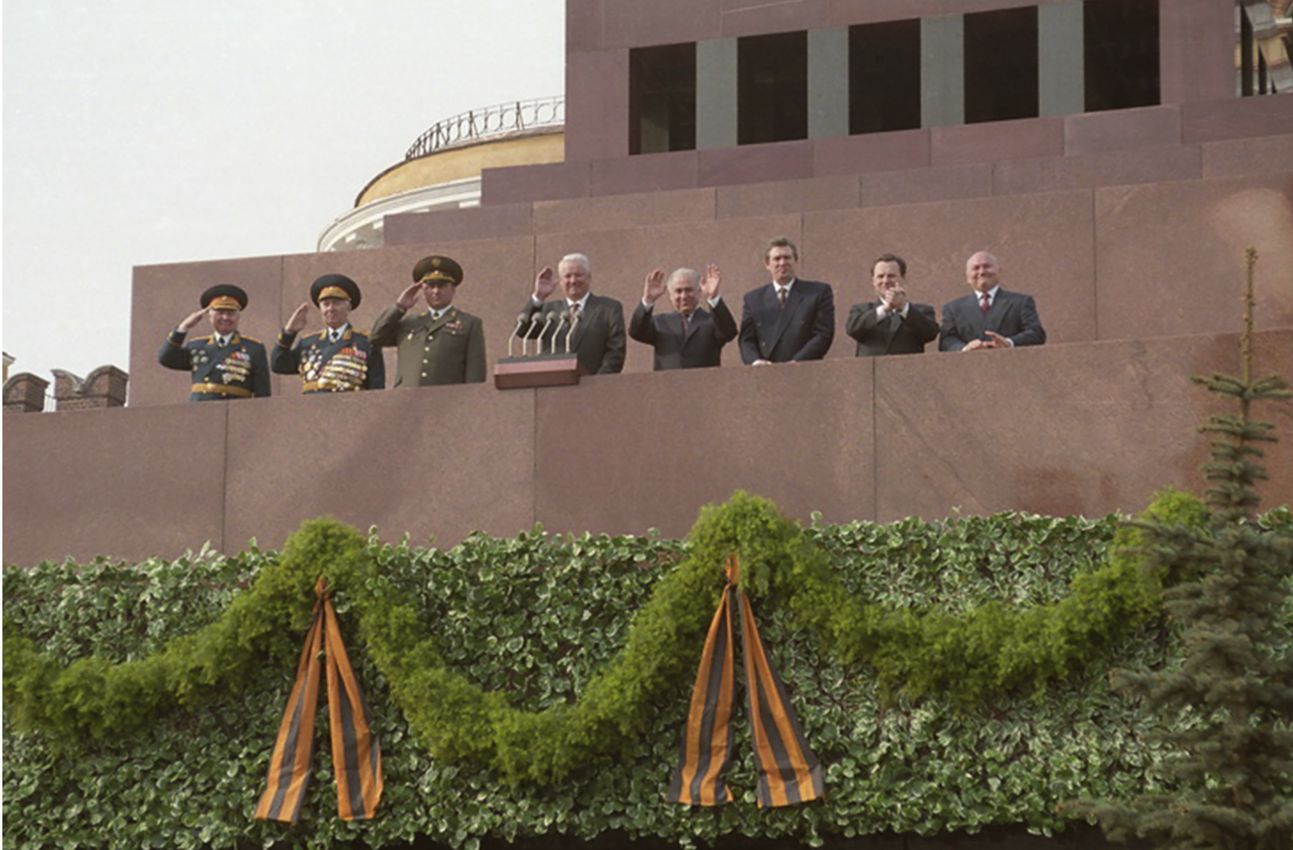
Boris Yeltsin and the country's leadership on the Lenin Mausoleum tribune during the celebration of the 50th anniversary of Victory, 9 May 1995

In 1995, as Yeltsin struggled to finance Russia's growing foreign debt and gain support from the Russian business elite for his bid in the 1996 presidential elections, the Russian president prepared for a new wave of privatization offering stock shares in some of Russia's most valuable state enterprises in exchange for bank loans. The programme was promoted as a way of simultaneously speeding up privatization and ensuring the government a cash infusion to cover its operating needs.

However, the deals were effectively giveaways of valuable state assets to a small group of tycoons in finance, industry, energy, telecommunications, and the media who came to be known as "oligarchs" in the mid-1990s. This was because ordinary people sold their vouchers for cash. The vouchers were bought by a small group of investors. By mid-1996, substantial ownership shares over major firms were acquired at very low prices by a handful of people. Boris Berezovsky, who controlled major stakes in several banks and the national media, emerged as one of Yeltsin's most prominent supporters. Along with Berezovsky, Mikhail Khodorkovsky, Vladimir Potanin, Vladimir Bogdanov, Rem Viakhirev, Vagit Alekperov, Alexander Smolensky, Viktor Vekselberg, Mikhail Fridman and a few years later Roman Abramovich, were habitually mentioned in the media as Russia's oligarchs.

==== Korean Air Lines Flight 007 ====
On 5 December 1991, Senator Jesse Helms, ranking member of the Minority on the U.S. Senate Committee on Foreign Relations, wrote to Yeltsin concerning U.S. servicemen who were POWs or MIAs: "The status of thousands and thousands of American servicemen who are held by Soviet and other Communist forces, and who were never repatriated after every major war this century, is of grave concern to the American people."

Yeltsin responded with a statement made on 15 June 1992, whilst being interviewed on board his presidential jet en route to the United States, "Our archives have shown that it is true— some of them were transferred to the territory of the USSR and were kept in labour camps... We can only surmise that some of them may still be alive." On 10 December 1991, five days after Helms had written to Yeltsin regarding American servicemen, he again wrote to Yeltsin, this time concerning Korean Air Lines Flight 007 (KAL 007) requesting information concerning possible survivors, including Georgia Congressman Larry McDonald, and their whereabouts.

One of the greatest tragedies of the Cold War was the shoot-down of the Korean Airlines Flight 007 by the Armed Forces of what was then the Soviet Union on 1 September 1983... The KAL-007 tragedy was one of the most tense incident of the entire Cold War. However, now that relations between our two nations have improved substantially, I believe that it is time to resolve the mysteries surrounding this event. Clearing the air on this issue could help further to improve relations.

— Senator Jesse Helms, writing to Yeltsin, 10 December 1991

In March 1992, Yeltsin handed over KAL 007's black box without its tapes to South Korean president Roh Tae-woo at the end of the plenary session of the South Korean National Assembly, saying "We apologize for the tragedy and are trying to settle some unsolved issues." Yeltsin released the tapes of the KAL 007's black box (its digital flight data recorder and cockpit voice recorder) to the International Civil Aviation Organization (ICAO) on 8 January 1993. For years the Soviet authorities had denied possessing these tapes. The openness of Yeltsin about POW/MIA and KAL 007 matters may also have signaled his willingness for more openness to the West. In 1992, which he labeled the "window of opportunity", he was willing to discuss biological weapons with the United States and admitted that the Sverdlovsk anthrax leak of 2 April 1979 (which Yeltsin had originally been involved in concealing) had been caused as the result of a mishap at a military facility. The Russian government had maintained that the cause was contaminated meat. The true number of victims in the anthrax outbreak at Sverdlovsk, about 850 miles (1,368 km) east of Moscow, is unknown.

==== 1996 presidential election ====
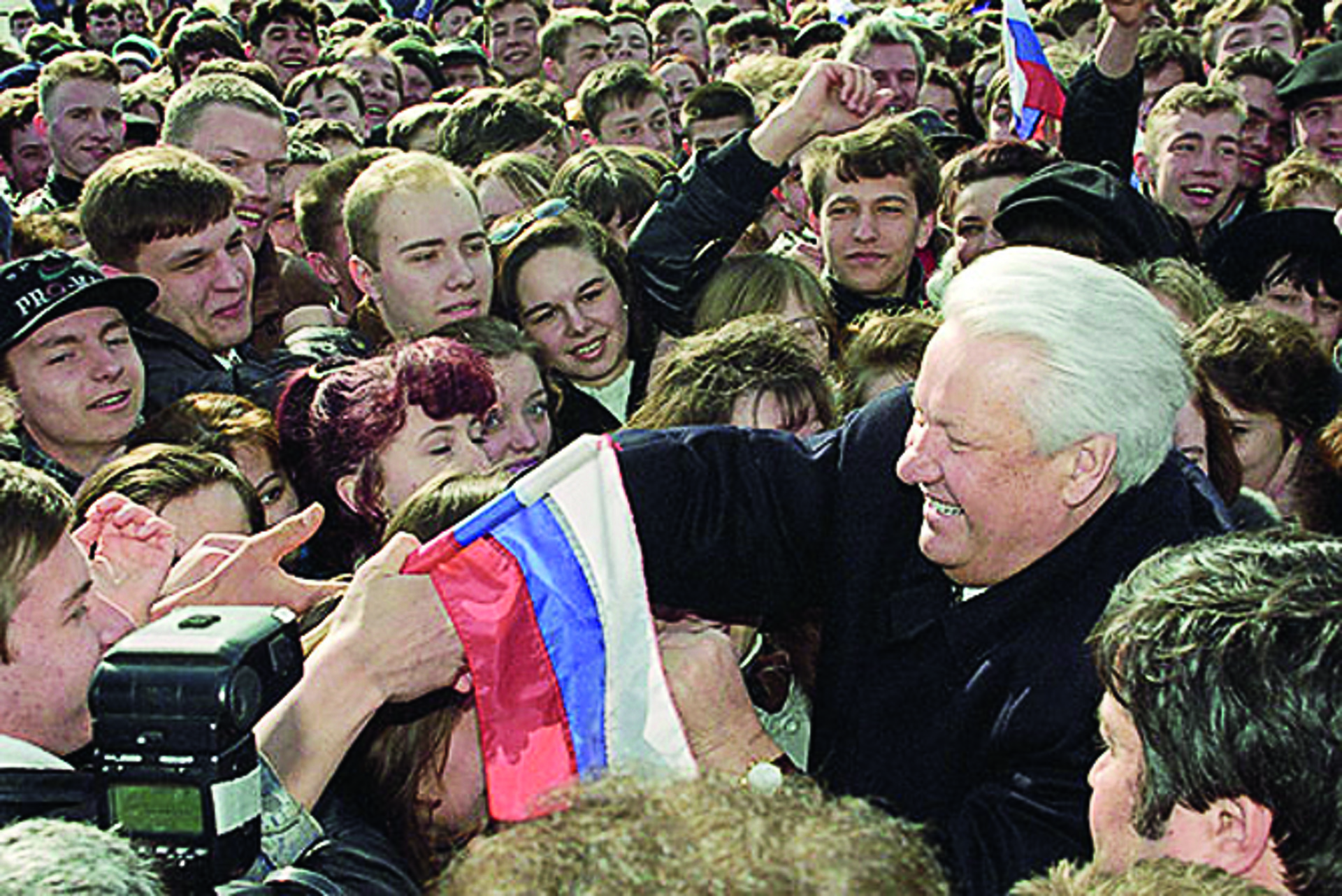
Yeltsin at an election rally in Belgorod, 1996

In February 1996, Yeltsin announced that he would seek a second term in the 1996 Russian presidential election in the summer. This announcement came after weeks of speculation that Yeltsin's political career was nearing its end because of his health problems and growing unpopularity in Russia. At the time, Yeltsin was recuperating from a series of heart attacks, and both domestic and international observers had noted his occasionally erratic behavior. By the time campaigning began in early 1996, Yeltsin's popularity was close to being non-existent. Meanwhile, the opposition Communist Party had already gained significant ground in the parliamentary elections held on 17 December 1995. Its candidate, Gennady Zyuganov, boasted a strong grassroots organization, especially in the rural areas and small towns, and effectively appealed to nostalgia for the Soviet Union's international prestige and the domestic order under state socialism. At the same time, during and after the elections, the Communist Party secured the stability of Yeltsin and his regime, who relied on anti-communist rhetoric and on the fear of a resurgence of a strong communist party. During the elections, Yeltsin positioned himself as the only credible anti-communist candidate, able to prevent a new revolution and civil war and lead Russia toward stability and peace. The pro-government and pro-Yeltsin forces launched an anti-communist propaganda campaign in the media and established a special anti-communist newspaper Ne Dai Bog ("God forbid") promoting Yeltsin.

Panic struck the Yeltsin team when opinion polls suggested that the ailing president could not win; some members of his entourage urged him to cancel the presidential elections and effectively rule as a dictator from then on. Instead, Yeltsin changed his campaign team, assigning a key role to his daughter, Tatyana Dyachenko, and appointing Chubais as campaign manager. Chubais, acting as both Yeltsin's campaign manager and adviser on Russia's privatization programme, used his control of the privatization programme as an instrument of Yeltsin's re-election campaign.

The results of the second round of the 1996 elections. Grey highlighted regions where Yeltsin won.

In mid-1996, Chubais and Yeltsin recruited a team of a handful of financial and media oligarchs to bankroll the Yeltsin campaign and guarantee favorable media coverage to the president on national television and in leading newspapers. In return, Chubais allowed well-connected Russian business leaders to acquire majority stakes in some of Russia's most valuable state-owned assets.

U.S. president Bill Clinton also threw his support behind Yeltsin's campaign. At the White House's direction, American advisors were sent to join the campaign team of the sitting Russian president to teach new electoral techniques. Several European governments also showed their support for Yeltsin. French prime minister Alain Juppé visited Moscow on 14 February, the day Yeltsin's candidacy was announced, and said he hoped the election campaign would be "an opportunity to highlight the achievements of President Yeltsin's reform policy". On the same day, German chancellor Helmut Kohl visited Moscow, describing Yeltsin as "an absolutely reliable partner who has always respected his commitments".

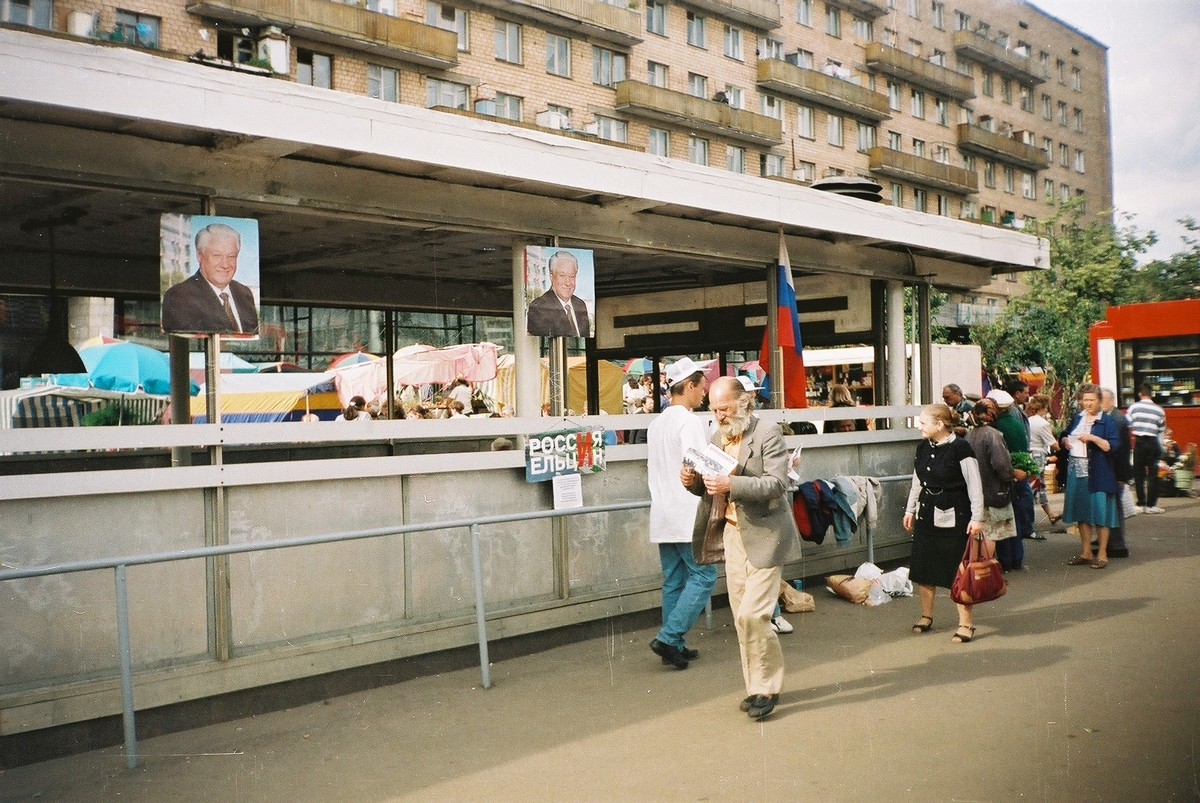
Yeltsin presidential campaign

Yeltsin campaigned energetically, dispelling concerns about his health and maintaining a high media profile. To boost his popularity, Yeltsin promised to abandon some of his more unpopular economic reforms, boost welfare spending, end the war in Chechnya, and pay wage and pension arrears. Yeltsin had benefited from the approval of a US$10.2 billion International Monetary Fund loan to Russia, which helped to keep his government afloat.

Zyuganov, who lacked Yeltsin's resources and financial backing, saw his early lead gradually erode. After the first round of voting on 16 June, Yeltsin appointed Alexander Lebed, a popular candidate who had finished in third place in the first round, as secretary of the Security Council of Russia. At Lebed's behest, Yeltsin fired defense minister Pavel Grachev and, on 20 June, sacked a number of his siloviki, one of them being his chief of presidential security Alexander Korzhakov, viewed by many as Yeltsin's éminence grise. In the run-off on 3 July, with a turnout of 68.9%, Yeltsin won 53.8% of the vote and Zyuganov 40.7%, with the rest (5.9%) voting "against all".

=== 1996–1999: Second term ===
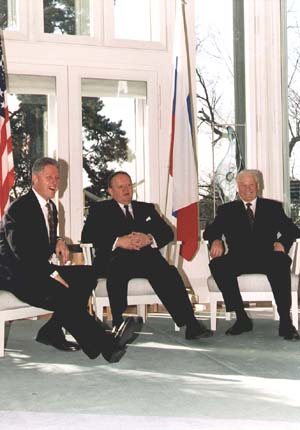
Yeltsin (right) meeting with President Bill Clinton (left) and President Martti Ahtisaari (middle) in Helsinki, Finland on 21 March 1997

Yeltsin underwent emergency quintuple heart bypass surgery in November 1996, and remained in the hospital for months. During his presidency, Russia received US$40 billion in funds from the International Monetary Fund and other international lending organizations. However, his opponents allege that most of these funds were stolen by people from Yeltsin's circle ("The Family", the extended family of President Yeltsin himself, his daughters, his sons-in-law, their friends, their advisers and their backers, including Yeltsin's daughter Tatyana Dyachenko and his chief of staff, Valentin Yumashev). and placed into foreign banks.

From 1997, Yeltsin started to meet regularly with Chinese leader Jiang Zemin. Yeltsin visited Beijing in November 1997, while Jiang visited Moscow in 1998. Relations were further strengthened by the joint opposition to the NATO intervention in Yugoslavia. In 1998, a political and economic crisis emerged when Kiriyenko's government defaulted on its debts, causing financial markets to panic and the ruble to collapse in the 1998 Russian financial crisis. During the 1999 Kosovo War, Yeltsin strongly opposed the NATO military campaign against Yugoslavia, and warned of possible Russian intervention if NATO deployed ground troops to Kosovo. In televised comments, he stated: "I told NATO, the Americans, the Germans: Don't push us towards military action. Otherwise, there will be a European war for sure and possibly a world war." Yeltsin said that NATO's bombing of Yugoslavia "trampled upon the foundations of international law and the United Nations charter".

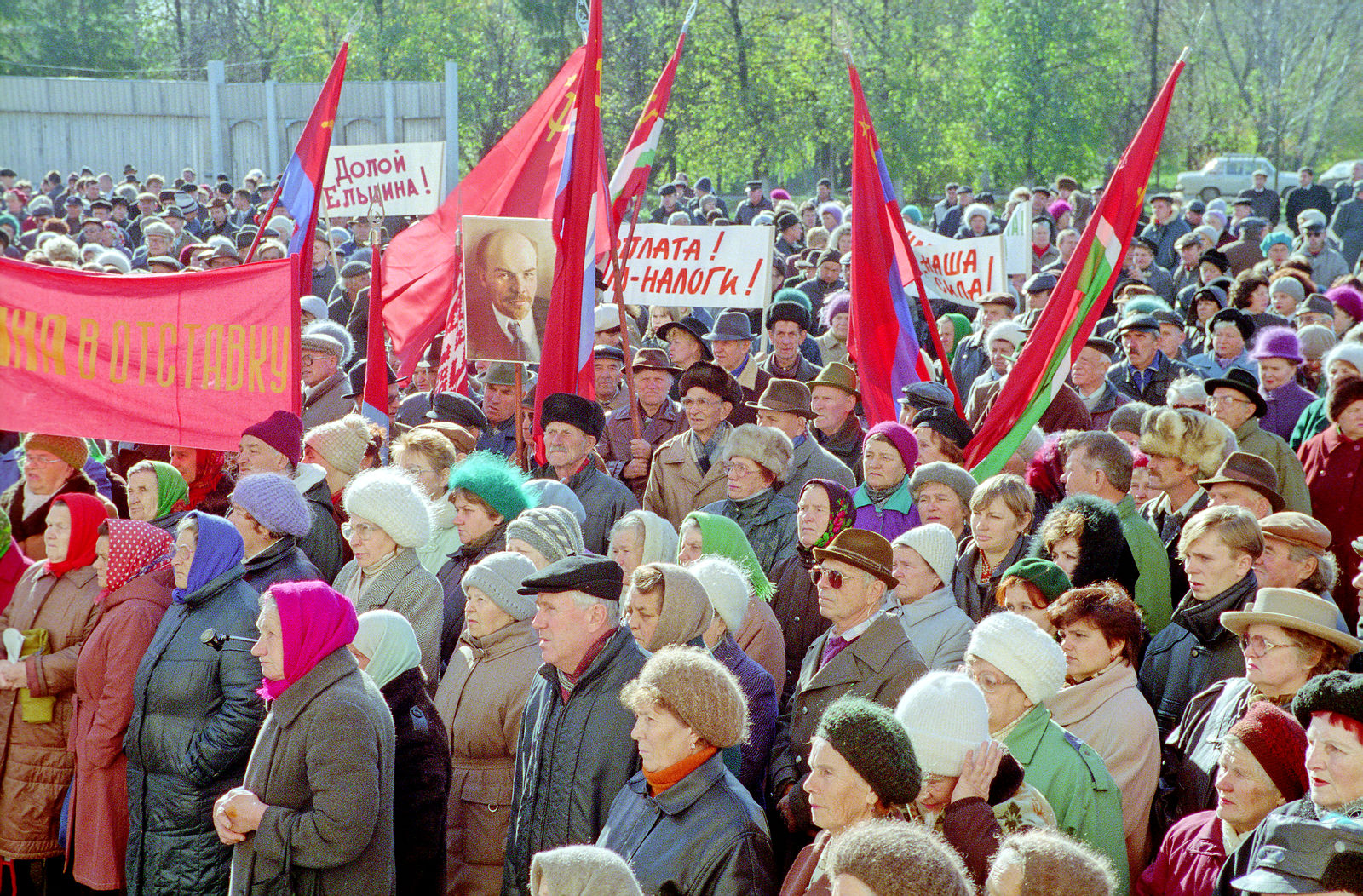
Anti-Yeltsin protests

On 9 August 1999, Yeltsin fired his prime minister, Sergei Stepashin, and for the fourth time, fired his entire Cabinet. In Stepashin's place, he appointed Vladimir Putin, relatively unknown at that time, and announced his wish to see Putin as his successor. In late 1999, Yeltsin and U.S. president Bill Clinton openly disagreed on the war in Chechnya. At the November meeting of the Organization for Security and Cooperation in Europe, Clinton pointed his finger at Yeltsin and demanded he halt bombing attacks that had resulted in many civilian casualties. Yeltsin immediately left the conference.

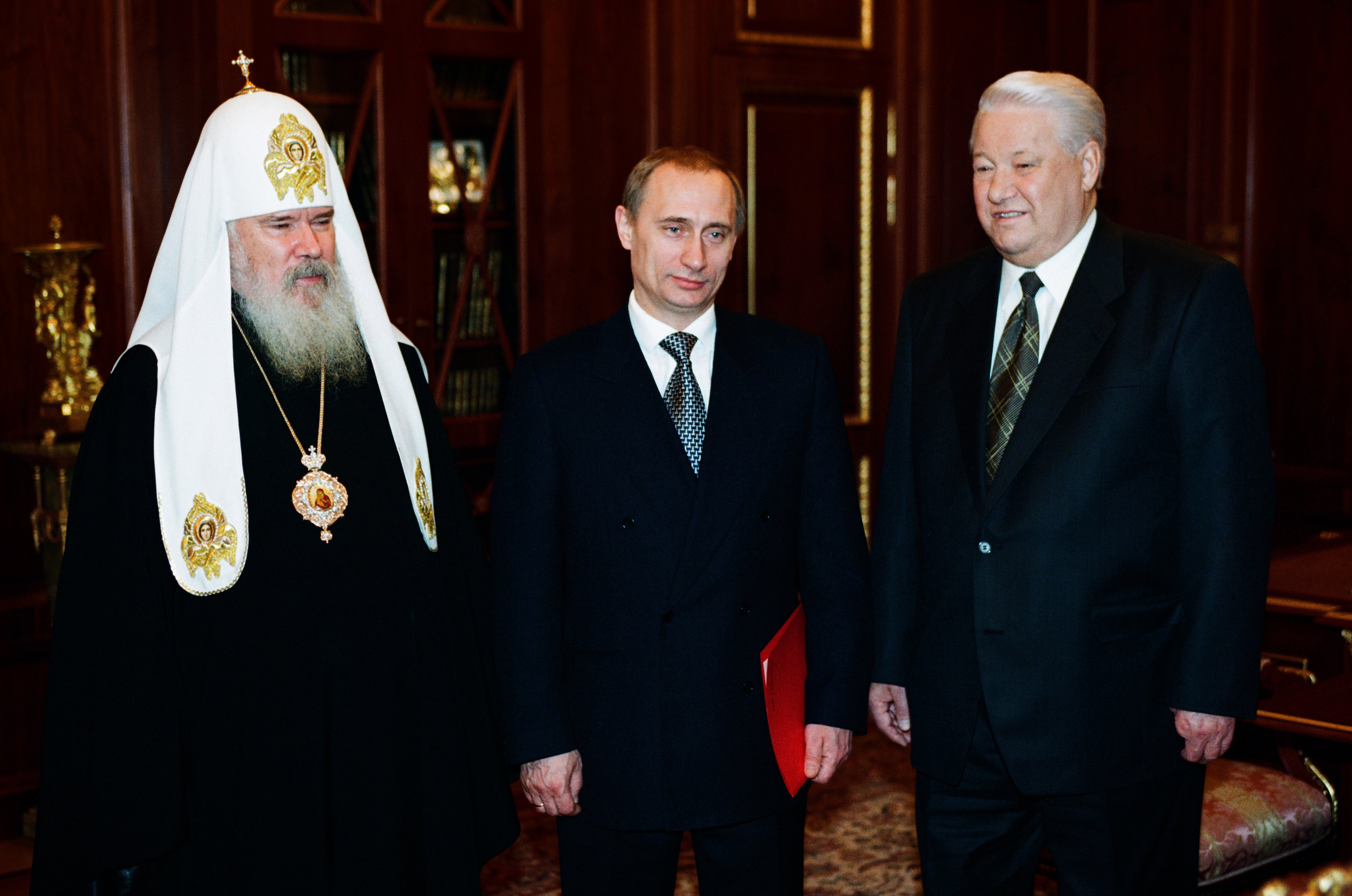
Yeltsin with Patriarch Alexy II and Prime Minister Vladimir Putin

In December, whilst visiting China to seek support on Chechnya, Yeltsin replied to Clinton's criticism of a Russian ultimatum to citizens of Grozny. He bluntly pronounced: "Yesterday, Clinton permitted himself to put pressure on Russia. It seems he has for a minute, for a second, for half a minute, forgotten that Russia has a full arsenal of nuclear weapons. He has forgotten about that." Clinton dismissed Yeltsin's comments stating: "I didn't think he'd forgotten that America was a great power when he disagreed with what I did in Kosovo." It fell to Putin to downplay Yeltsin's comments and present reassurances about U.S. and Russian relations.

==== Attempted 1999 impeachment ====
On 15 May 1999, Yeltsin survived another impeachment attempt, this time by the democratic and communist opposition in the State Duma. He was charged with several unconstitutional activities, including the signing of the Belovezha Accords dissolving the Soviet Union in December 1991, the coup-d'état in October 1993, and initiating the war in Chechnya in 1994. None of these charges received the two-thirds majority of the Duma required to initiate the process of impeachment.

==== Mabetex corruption ====
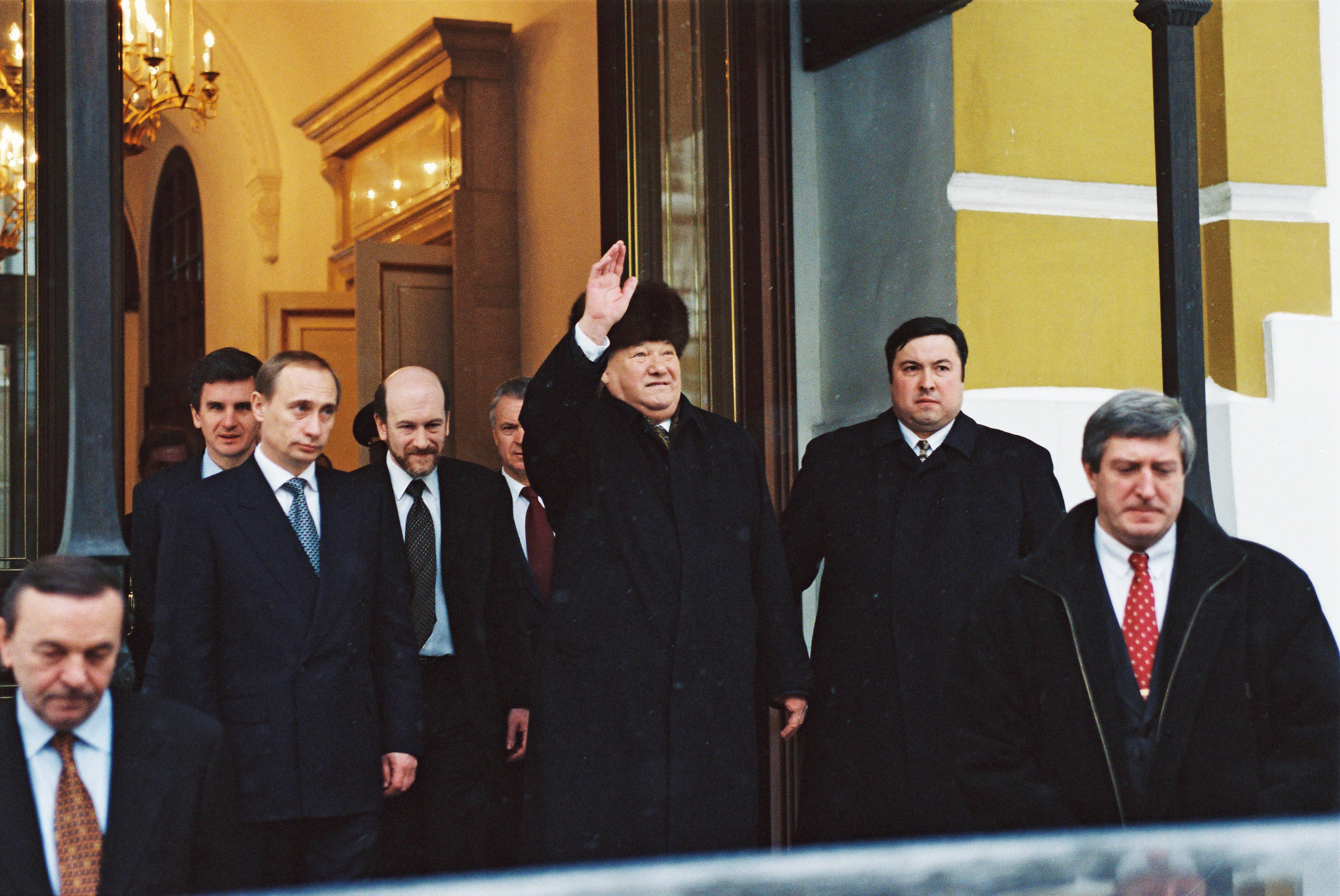
Yeltsin on the day of his resignation, together with Putin and Aleksandr Voloshin

With Pavel Borodin as the Kremlin property manager, Swiss construction firm Mabetex was awarded many important Russian government contracts. They were awarded the contracts to reconstruct, renovate and refurbish the former Russian Federation Parliament, the Russian Opera House, State Duma and the Moscow Kremlin.

In 1998, the prosecutor general of Russia, Yuri Skuratov, opened a bribery investigation against Mabetex, accusing its chief executive officer Behgjet Pacolli of bribing Yeltsin and his family. Swiss authorities issued an international arrest warrant for Pavel Borodin, the official who managed the Kremlin's property empire. Stating that bribery was a common business practice in Russia, Pacolli confirmed in early December 1999 that he had guaranteed five credit cards for Yeltsin's wife, Naina, and two daughters, Tatyana and Yelena. Yeltsin resigned a few weeks later on 31 December 1999, appointing Vladimir Putin as his successor. Putin's first decree as president was lifelong immunity from prosecution for Yeltsin.

==== Resignation ====
Boris Yeltsin's 1999 new year address in which he announced his resignation

On 31 December 1999, during a televised New Year address, Yeltsin issued his resignation on the state-owned ORT channel. In the speech, he praised the advances in cultural, political, and economic freedom that his administration had overseen although apologized to Russia's people for "not making many of your and my dreams come true. What seemed simple to do proved to be excruciatingly difficult." Yeltsin additionally announced that Vladimir Putin, then the most popular politician in the country, would be serving as acting president for the remaining three months until the next presidential election on 26 March 2000.

Yeltsin's approval ratings had been estimated to have been at their lowest by the time he left office, having plummeted to as low as 2–4%. Polling also suggests that a majority of the Russian population were pleased by Yeltsin's resignation.

== Heart disease and alcoholism ==
Yeltsin suffered from heart disease during his first term as President of Russia, probably continuing for the rest of his life. He is known to have suffered heart problems in March 1990, just after being elected as a member of parliament. It was common knowledge that, in early 1996, he was recuperating from a series of heart attacks and, soon after, he spent months in hospital recovering from a quintuple bypass operation (see above).

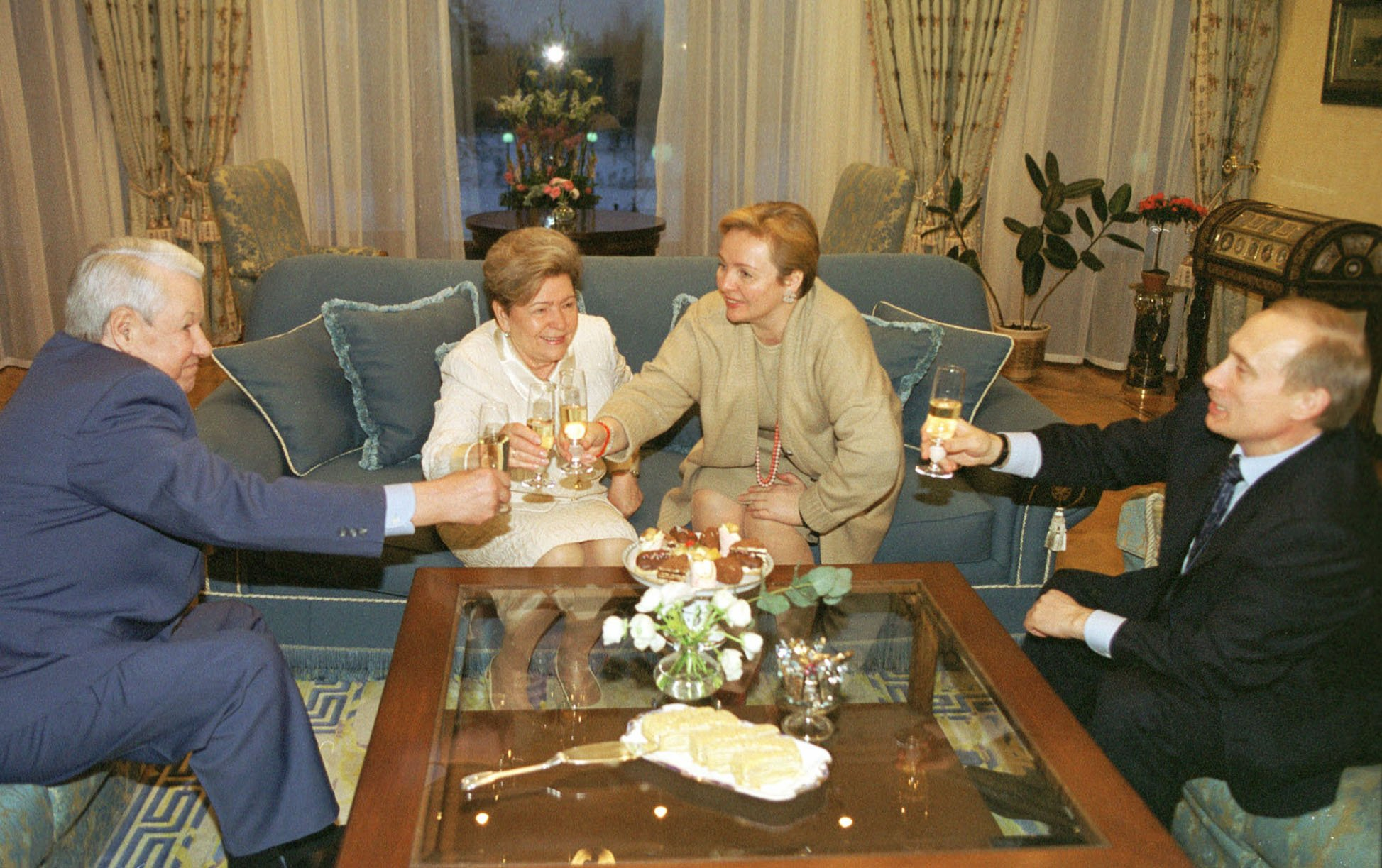
Boris and Naina Yeltsina with President Vladimir Putin and First Lady Lyudmila on Yeltsin's 71st birthday, 2002

According to numerous reports, Yeltsin was alcohol dependent until 1996, when his worsening health made him give up heavy drinking. The topic made headlines abroad during Yeltsin's visit to the U.S. in 1989 for a series of lectures on social and political life in the Soviet Union. A report in the Italian newspaper La Repubblica, reprinted by Pravda, reported that Yeltsin often appeared drunk in public. His alcoholism was also the subject of media discussion following his meeting with U.S. Deputy Secretary of State Strobe Talbott following Clinton's inauguration in 1993 and an incident during a flight stop-over at Shannon Airport, Ireland, in September 1994, when the waiting Irish prime minister, Albert Reynolds, was told that Yeltsin was unwell and would not be leaving the aircraft. Speaking to the media in March 2010, Yeltsin's daughter, Tatyana Yumasheva, claimed that her father had suffered a heart attack on the flight from the United States to Moscow and was therefore not in a position to leave the plane.

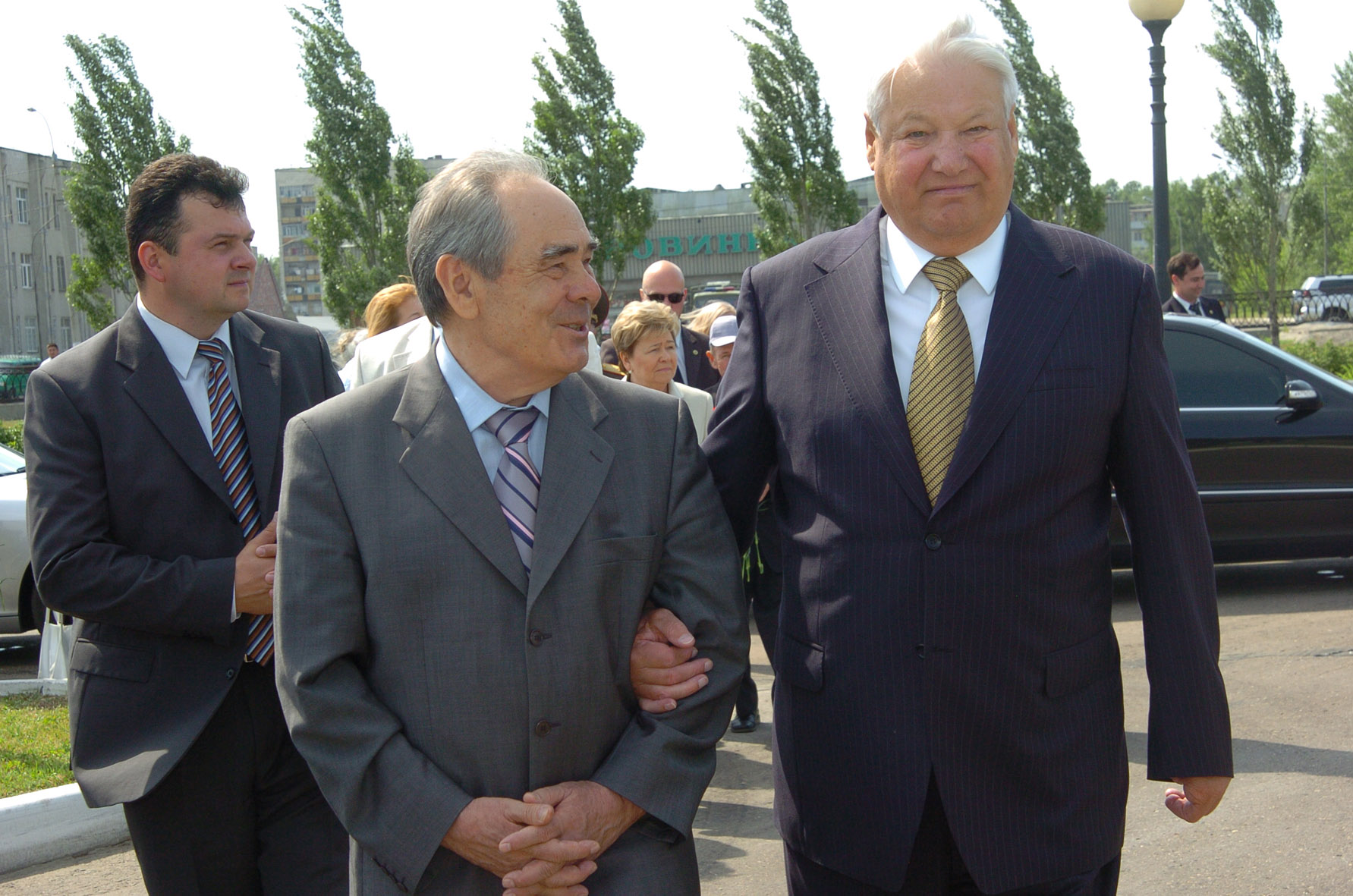
With Mintimer Shaimiev on 22 June 2006

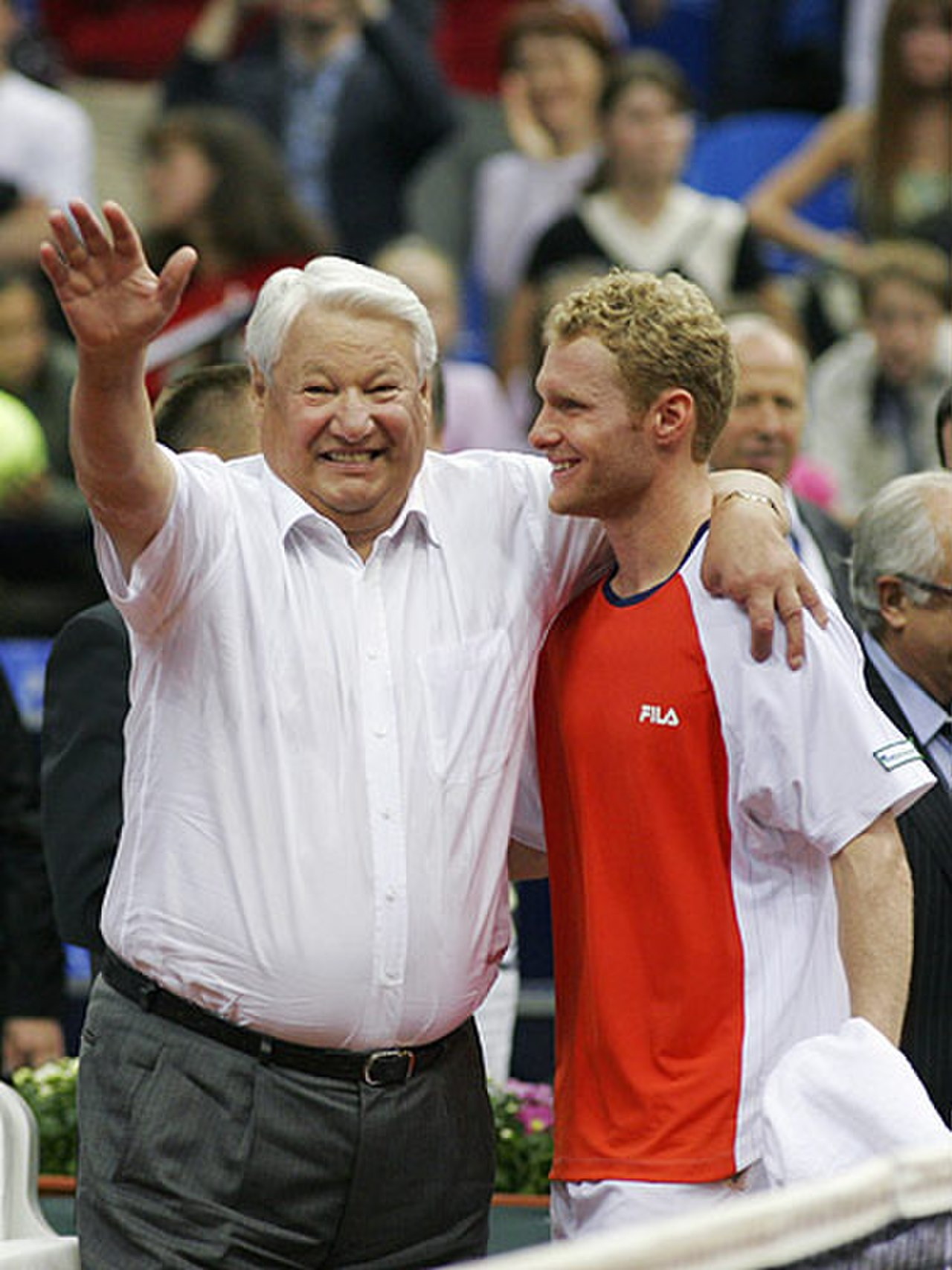
Yeltsin with tennis player Dmitry Tursunov in 2006

According to former deputy prime minister of Russia Boris Nemtsov, the bizarre behavior of Yeltsin resulted from "strong drugs" given to him by Kremlin doctors, which were incompatible even with a small amount of alcohol. This was discussed by journalist Yelena Tregubova from the Kremlin pool in connection with an episode during Yeltsin's visit to Stockholm in 1997, when Yeltsin suddenly started talking nonsense (he allegedly told his bemused audience that Swedish meatballs reminded him of Björn Borg's face), lost his balance, and almost fell down on the podium after drinking a single glass of champagne.

In his memoirs, Yeltsin claimed no recollection of the event but did make a passing reference to the incident when he met Borg a year later at the World Circle Kabaddi Cup in Hamilton, Ontario, where the pair had been invited to present the trophy. He made a hasty withdrawal from the funeral of King Hussein of Jordan in February 1999 to use the facilities.

After Yeltsin's death, Michiel Staal, a Dutch neurosurgeon, said that his team had been secretly flown to Moscow to operate on Yeltsin in 1999. Yeltsin suffered from an unspecified neurological disorder that affected his sense of balance, causing him to wobble as if in a drunken state; the goal of the operation was to reduce the pain.

Former U.S. president Bill Clinton claimed that on a 1995 visit to Washington, Yeltsin was found on Pennsylvania Avenue, drunk, in his underwear and trying to hail a taxi cab to find pizza.

Yeltsin's personal and health problems received a great deal of attention in the global press. As the years went on, he was often viewed as an increasingly drunk and unstable leader, rather than the inspiring figure he was once seen as. The possibility that he might die in office was often discussed. Starting in the last years of his presidential term, Yeltsin's primary residence was the Gorki-9 presidential dacha west of Moscow. He made frequent stays at the nearby government sanatorium in Barvikha. In October 1999, Yeltsin was hospitalized with the flu and a fever, and in the following month, he was hospitalized with pneumonia, just days after receiving treatment for bronchitis.

== Post-presidency ==
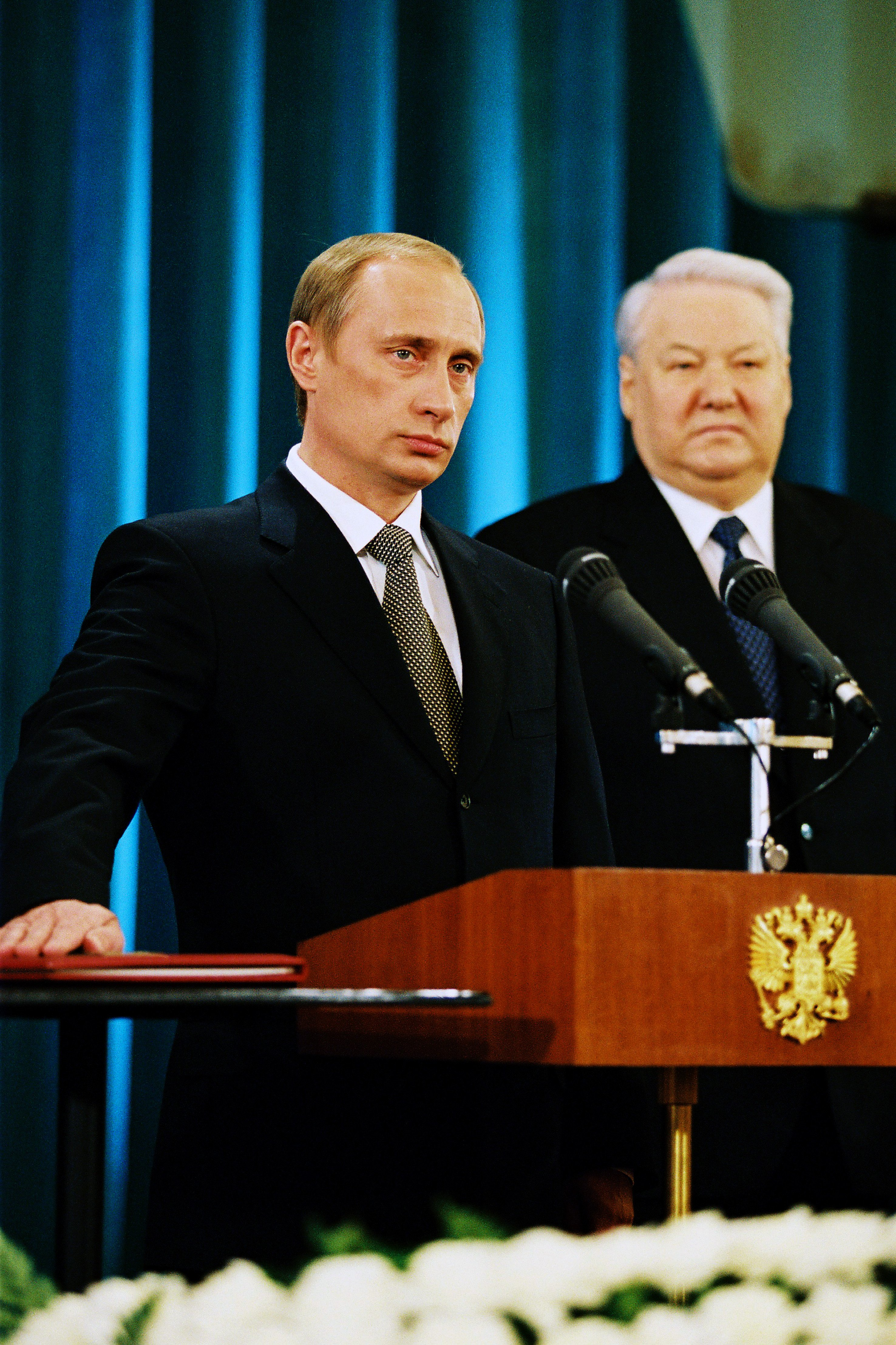
Yeltsin looking on as his successor Putin is taking the presidential oath (7 May 2000)

Yeltsin maintained a low profile after his resignation, making almost no public statements or appearances. He criticized his successor Putin in December 2000 for supporting the reintroduction of the tune of the Soviet-era national anthem, albeit with different lyrics. In January 2001, he was hospitalized for six weeks with pneumonia resulting from a viral infection. On 13 September 2004, following the Beslan school hostage crisis and nearly concurrent terrorist attacks in Moscow, Putin launched an initiative to replace the election of regional governors with a system whereby they would be directly appointed by the president and approved by regional legislatures. Yeltsin, together with Mikhail Gorbachev, publicly criticized Putin's plan as a step away from democracy in Russia and a return to the centrally-run political apparatus of the Soviet era.

In September 2005, Yeltsin underwent a hip operation in Moscow after breaking his femur in a fall while on holiday in the Italian island of Sardinia. On 1 February 2006, Yeltsin celebrated his 75th birthday.

== Death and funeral ==
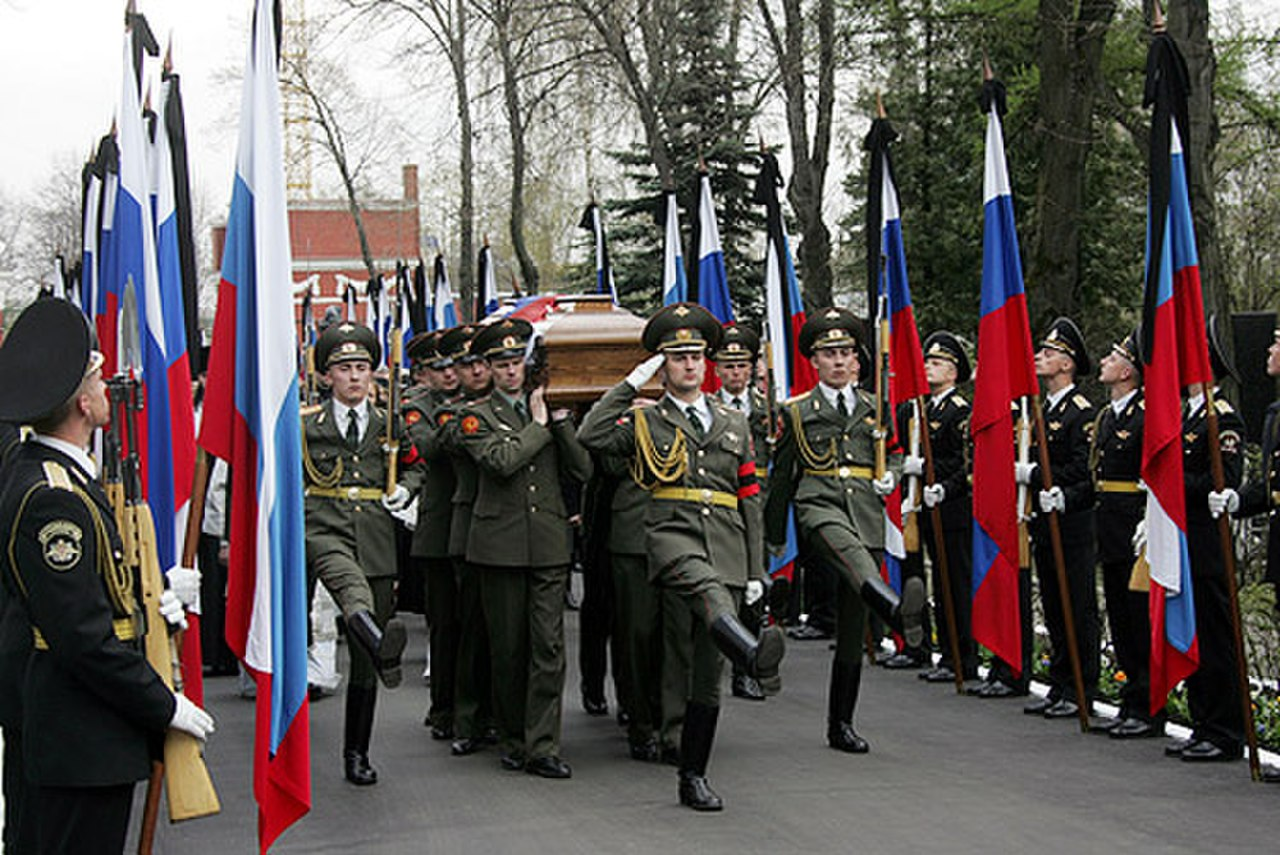
Yeltsin's coffin being carried to the cemetery at his funeral

Yeltsin died of congestive heart failure on 23 April 2007, aged 76. According to experts quoted by Komsomolskaya Pravda, the onset of Yeltsin's condition began during his visit to Jordan between 25 March and 2 April. He was buried in the Novodevichy Cemetery on 25 April 2007, following a period during which his body had lain in repose in the Cathedral of Christ the Saviour in Moscow.

Yeltsin was the first Russian head of state in 113 years to be buried in a church ceremony, after Emperor Alexander III. He was survived by his wife, Naina Iosifovna Yeltsina, whom he married in 1956, and their two daughters Yelena and Tatyana, born in 1957 and 1960, respectively.

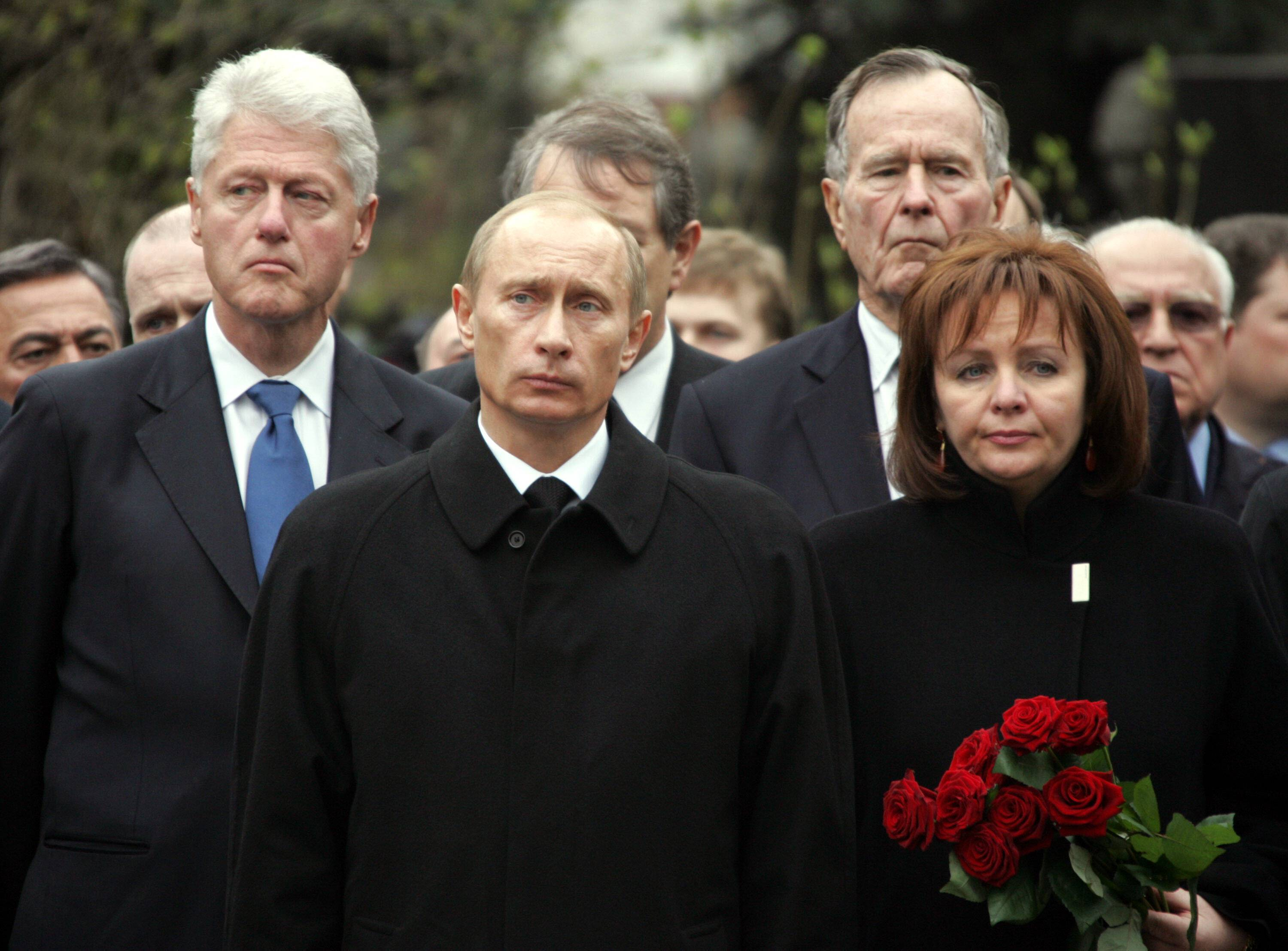
Russian president Vladimir Putin and former U.S. presidents George H. W. Bush and Bill Clinton attended Yeltsin's funeral.

President Putin declared the day of his funeral a national day of mourning, with the nation's flags flown at half-staff and all entertainment programs suspended for the day. Putin said, upon declaring 25 April 2007 a day of national mourning, that:

Yeltsin's Presidency has inscribed him forever in Russian and in world history. ...

A new democratic Russia was born during his time: a free, open and peaceful country. A state in which the power truly does belong to the people. ... the first President of Russia's strength consisted in the mass support of Russian citizens for his ideas and aspirations. Thanks to the will and direct initiative of President Boris Yeltsin a new constitution, one which declared human rights a supreme value, was adopted. It gave people the opportunity to freely express their thoughts, to freely choose power in Russia, to realize their creative and entrepreneurial plans. This Constitution permitted us to begin building a truly effective Federation. ... We knew him as a brave and a warm-hearted, spiritual person. He was an upstanding and courageous national leader. And he was always very honest and frank while defending his position. ...

[Yeltsin] assumed full responsibility for everything he called for, for everything he aspired to. For everything he tried to do and did do for the sake of Russia, for the sake of millions of Russians. And he invariably took upon himself, let it in his heart, all the trials and tribulations of Russia, peoples' difficulties and problems.

Shortly after the news broke, former Soviet leader Mikhail Gorbachev issued a statement, saying:

"I express my profoundest condolences to the family of the deceased, who had major deeds for the good of the country as well as serious mistakes behind him. It was a tragic destiny."

== Ideology ==
During the late Soviet period, Yeltsin's ideological worldview began to shift. Colton argued that populism and "a non-ethnic Russianism" had begun to enter Yeltsin's thinking while he was First Secretary of Sverdlovsk. In the late 1980s, Yeltsin told the Athens daily newspaper Kathimerini that "I regard myself as a social democrat", despite his economic privatisation programs, adding: "Those who still believe in communism are moving in the sphere of fantasy."

Linking Yeltsin with "liberal Russian nationalism", Alfred B. Evans described Yeltsin as having "exerted a crucial influence on the development of Russian nationalism". Yeltsin helped to channel the aspirations of Russian nationalism in ways that did not lead to clashes with the nationalisms of other national groups within the Soviet Union. As head of the Russian SFSR, he stressed the specific interests of the Russian republic within the broader Soviet Union. Evans compared Yeltsin's turn away from the "empire-building" of the Soviet Union to the ideas of the writer and dissident Aleksandr Solzhenitsyn, who had called in the 1980s for Russia to extricate itself from the Soviet Union.

However, Evans thought that Yeltsin still appeared to believe by 1990 that the Ukrainians and Belarusians, as fellow East Slavic nationalities, would want to remain politically united with Russia in federal form. By 1991, it was obvious that this would not occur as the Ukrainian population favored full independence. Over the course of his presidency, he made increasing concessions to right-wing ethnic Russian nationalism by expressing growing concern over the fate of ethnic Russians in neighboring countries.

== Personal life ==
Colton described Yeltsin as a man who "teemed with inner complexities", who exhibited both a "mathematical cast of mind" and a "taste for adventure", noting that Yeltsin had "the intuition for grasping a situation holistically". Colton thought Yeltsin could be bullheaded, and restless. Evans noted that in Yeltsin's autobiography, the leader appeared to view himself as more of a Soviet person than a Russian. Throughout his life, Yeltsin sustained a number of health problems which he would usually try to conceal. As a child, he sustained both a broken nose and a maimed hand, physical attributes he remained self-conscious about; in public he would often conceal his left hand under the table or behind his tie. He was also deaf on the right side due to a middle-ear infection. Although his mother was a devout Orthodox Christian, Yeltsin did not grow up as a practitioner, only becoming so in the 1980s and 1990s.

Yeltsin stated that his "style of management" was "tough" and that he "demanded strict discipline and fulfilment of promises". Yeltsin was a workaholic; at UPI university, he developed the habit of sleeping for only four hours at night. He was punctual and very strict regarding the tardiness of his subordinates. He had an excellent memory, and enjoyed reading; by 1985 his family had around 6000 volumes in their possession. At UPI university, he was known for enjoying practical jokes. He enjoyed listening to folk songs and pop tunes, and from youth could play the lozhki spoons. Until poor health stopped him in the 1990s, Yeltsin enjoyed swimming in icy water, and throughout his life started each day with a cold shower. He also loved using the banya steambath. Yeltsin also enjoyed hunting and had his own collection of hunting guns. He liked to give watches and other keepsakes to his employees, often as a means of motivating them to work harder. He disliked people swearing, and when frustrated or angry, he was known to often snap pencils in his hand.

Yeltsin had a high tolerance for alcohol, and by the 1980s he was drinking alcohol at or above the average for the party elite. Yeltsin's favorite writer was Anton Chekhov, although he also enjoyed the work of Sergei Yesenin and Alexander Pushkin. Colton described Yeltsin as having a "husky baritone" voice.

Doder and Branson noted that Yeltsin was "a hero for young Russians, a cult figure to those who were not necessarily anticommunists but who were filled with bitterness and apathy" from the Brezhnev years. They noted he was "ebullient, almost outrageously open", and also "charismatic". They added that Yeltsin presented himself as "a true working-class hero" when challenging the Soviet administration.

Yeltsin had nevertheless always wanted a son. Yelena briefly married a school friend, Aleksei Fefelov, against her parents' wishes. They had a daughter, Yekaterina, in 1979, before separating. Yelena then married an Aeroflot pilot, Valerii Okulov, with whom she had a second daughter, Mariya, in 1983. Yeltsin's other daughter, Tatyana, married fellow student Vilen Khairullin, an ethnic Tatar, while studying at Moscow State University in 1980. In 1981 they had a son, named Boris after his grandfather, but soon separated. Tatyana then married again, to Leonid Dyachenko, and for a while they lived with Yeltsin at his Moscow apartment during the mid-1980s. Yeltsin was loyal to his friends. As friends, Yeltsin selected individuals he deemed to be professionally competent and morally fastidious. Aron noted that Yeltsin could be "an inexhaustible fount of merriment, exuberance and hospitality" among his friends.

== Reception and legacy ==
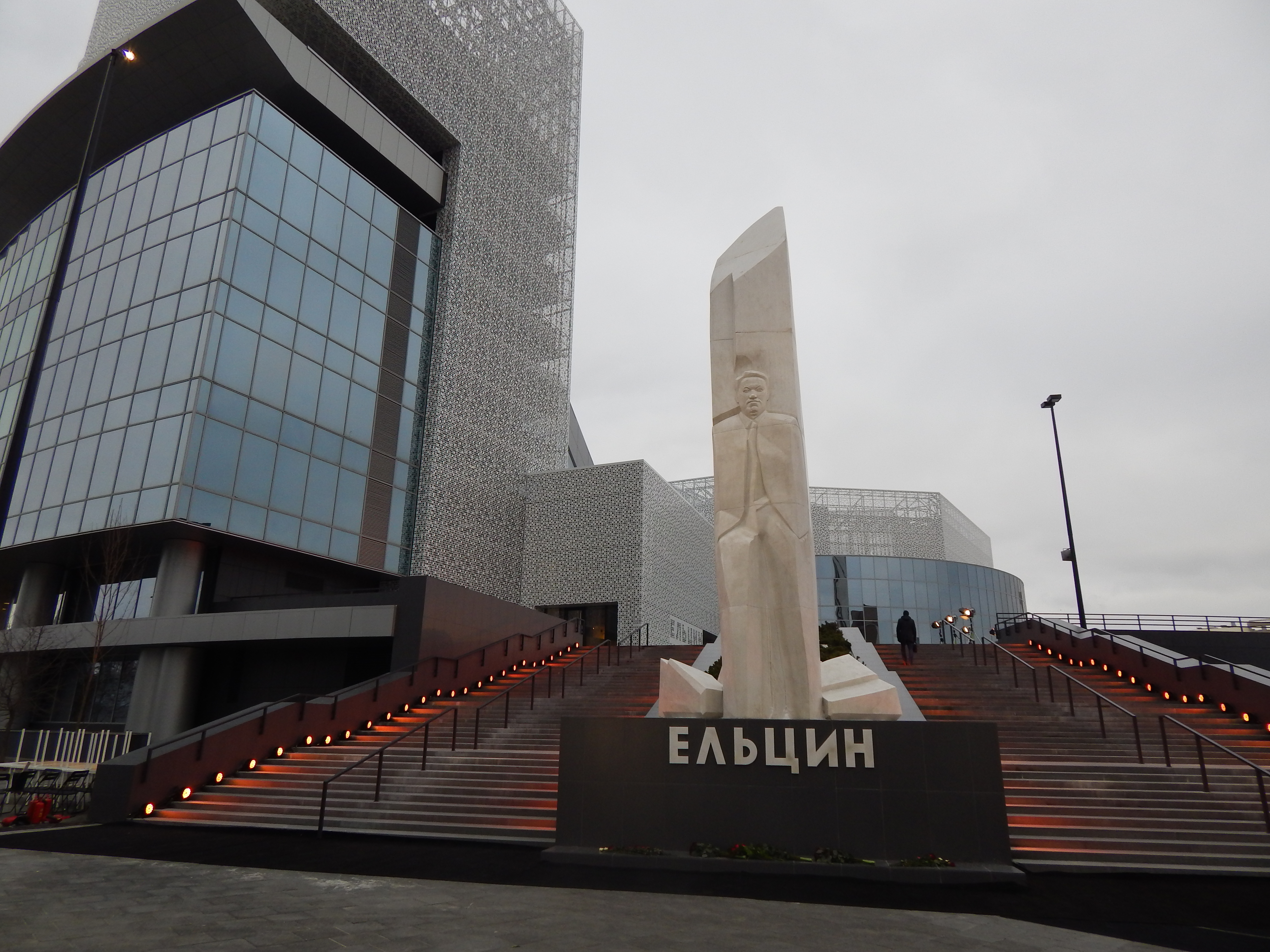
Yeltsin Center with the memorial sculpture

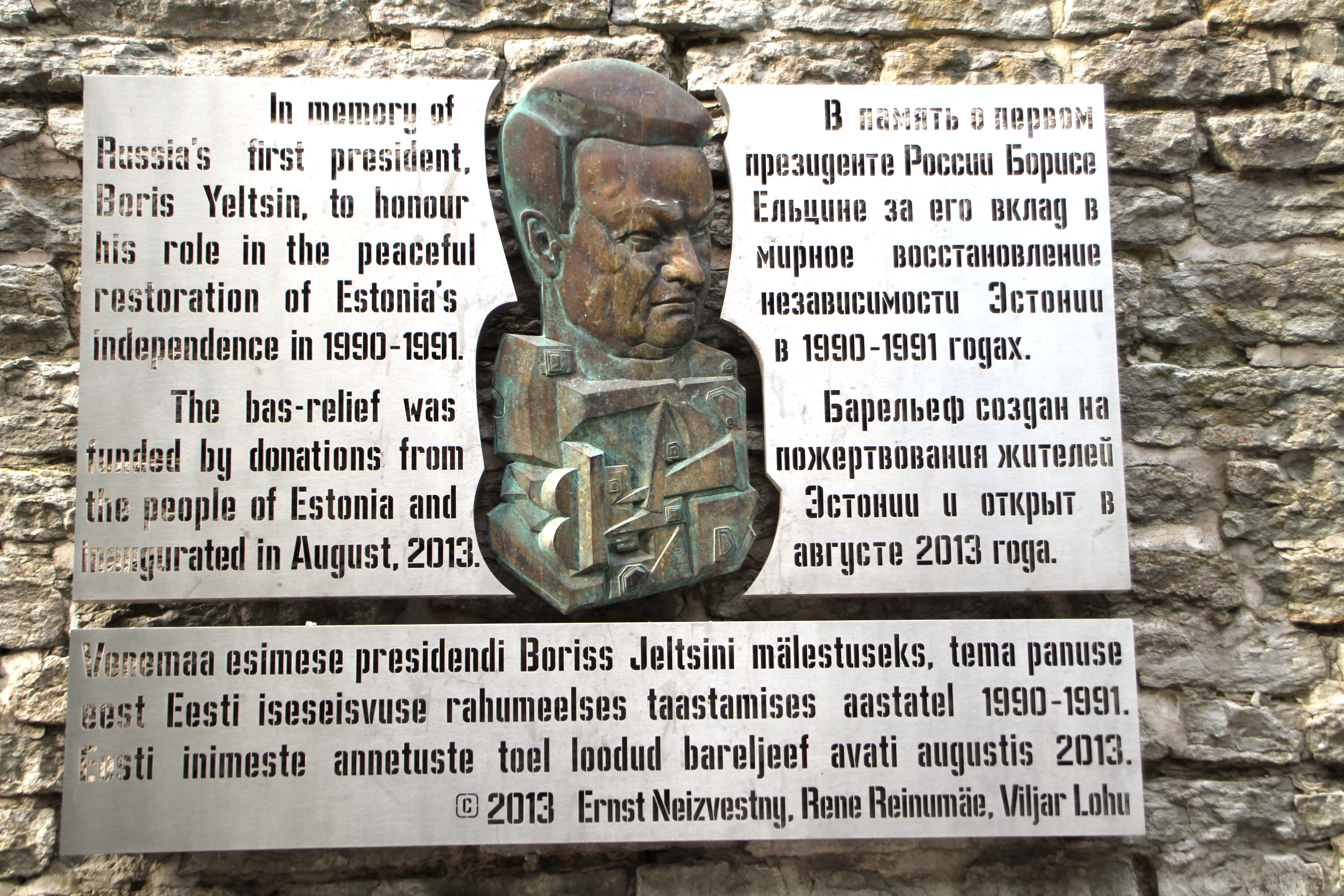
Memorial to Yeltsin in Tallinn, Estonia

Evaluations of Yeltsin are highly polarized. Former United States Ambassador to Russia Michael McFaul emphasizes the range pro and con:

Yeltsin certainly deserves credit for monumental achievements. On his watch, the Communist Party of the Soviet Union was destroyed, the largest empire on earth was peacefully dismantled, and electoral democracy was introduced into a country with a thousand-year history of autocratic rule....Yeltsin invites and eludes a ringing assessment. Was he a heroic revolutionary, or an erratic reformer? An astute politician and a committed democrat, or a populist improviser with little interest in the hard work of coalition building? Was he a daring economic reformer, or a blundering tool of the oligarchs? ...Does he emerge as a larger-than-life leader who rose to unprecedented challenges, or as a figure overwhelmed by the enormity of change? The answer, not surprisingly, is that Yeltsin was all of the above.

Colton suggested that "Yeltsin leaves nobody indifferent. He needs to be understood if we are to understand the age we inhabit". Aron characterised him as "Russia's first modern leader". Colton understood him as "a hero in history", albeit one who was "enigmatic and flawed". He expressed the view that Yeltsin was part of "the global trend away from authoritarianism and statism" that occurred in the 1990s, comparing him to Nelson Mandela, Lech Wałęsa, Václav Havel and Mikhail Gorbachev.

Observers have described Russia's government under Yeltsin as a hybrid or illiberal democratic regime, citing his frequent abuses of presidential power which led to hyper-presidentialism in Russia.

In the years following his presidency, there was comparatively little interest among biographers and historians in researching Yeltsin's life.

During his career as a figure in the Soviet Union, Yeltsin received ten medals and awards for his service to the state. In April 2008, a new memorial to Yeltsin was dedicated in Moscow's Novodevichy cemetery, to mixed reactions. At the memorial service, a military chorus performed Russia's national anthem – an anthem that was changed shortly after the end of Yeltsin's term, to follow the music of the old Soviet anthem, with lyrics reflecting Russia's new status.

Ryabov, who was formerly a close ally of Yeltsin's, claimed that his actions in the 1990s revealed that he was a turncoat.

In 2013, a memorial sculpture in relief, dedicated to Yeltsin, was erected on Nunne street, at the base of the Patkuli stairs in Tallinn, for his contribution to the peaceful independence of Estonia during 1990–1991.

In 2015, the Boris Yeltsin Presidential Center was opened in Yekaterinburg.

=== Public opinion in Russia ===
Yeltsin's legacy has remained a controversial topic in Russia. VCIOM, a Russian state owned polling institution, carried out a survey in 2001, over two years after Yeltsin's resignation, which showed the public's mostly negative perception of the former president at the time:

Nationwide VCIOM Survey: What is your general attitude to Yeltsin?
Admiration	0%
Respect	7%
Fondness	7%
Indifference	23%
Dislike	38%
Fear	1%
Revulsion	21%
Doesn't know	3%
Date: 20–23 April 2001. Sample size: 1600. Source:

Another VCIOM survey, carried out in 2010, showed the continuing unpopularity of Yeltsin three years after his death:

In historical perspective, do you think the Yeltsin epoch brought more good or more bad to Russia?
More bad	59%
More good	19%
Doesn't know	22%
Date: 17–21 December 2010. Sample size: 1611. Source:

== Honors and awards ==
Russian and Soviet

- Russia: Order "For Merit to the Fatherland", 1st class (12 June 2001) – a particularly outstanding contribution to the establishment and development of the Russian state
- Soviet Union: Order of Lenin (30 January 1981) – for services to the Communist Party and Soviet state and his fiftieth birthday
- Soviet Union: Order of the Red Banner of Labour, twice;
  - August 1971 – for services in carrying out a five-year plan
  - January 1974 – for achievements in the construction of the first stage of cold rolling shop at the Verkh-Isetsky Metallurgical Plant in Sverdlovsk
- Soviet Union: Order of the Badge of Honour (1966) – for achievements in implementing the seven-year plan targets for construction
- Russia: Medal "In Commemoration of the 1000th Anniversary of Kazan" (2006)
- Soviet Union: Jubilee Medal "In Commemoration of the 100th Anniversary of the Birth of Vladimir Ilyich Lenin" (November 1969)
- Soviet Union: Jubilee Medal "Thirty Years of Victory in the Great Patriotic War 1941–1945" (April 1975)
- Soviet Union: Jubilee Medal "60 Years of the Armed Forces of the USSR" (January 1978)
- Soviet Union: Gold Medal, Exhibition of Economic Achievements (October 1981)
- Russia: Medal – "In memory of the army as a volunteer" (March 2012, posthumous) – for a high contribution to the remembrance of the Great Patriotic War, with respect for the history of the Russian state, and for his contribution to the preservation of names of victims in conflicts in defence of the homeland

Foreign awards

- Belarus: Order of Francysk Skaryna (31 December 1999) – for his great personal contribution to the development and strengthening of Belarusian-Russian cooperation
- Kazakhstan: Order of the Golden Eagle (1997)
- Ukraine: Order of Prince Yaroslav the Wise, 1st class (22 January 2000) – for his significant personal contribution to the development of Ukrainian-Russian cooperation
- Italy: Knight Grand Cross with collar of the Order of Merit of the Italian Republic (1991)
- Latvia: Order of the Three Stars, 1st class (2006)
- Palestine: Order "Bethlehem 2000" (2000)
- France: Knight Grand Cross of the Legion of Honour (France)
- South Africa: Order of Good Hope, 1st class (1999)
- Lithuania: Medal of 13 January (9 January 1992)
- Lithuania: Grand Cross of the Order of the Cross of Vytis (10 June 2011, posthumous)
- Mongolia: Order "For Personal Courage" (18 October 2001)

Departmental awards

- Russia: Gorchakov Commemorative Medal (Russian Foreign Ministry, 1998)
- International Olympic Committee: Golden Olympic Order (International Olympic Committee, 1993)

Religious awards

- Russia: Order of Saint Blessed Grand Prince Dmitry Donskoy, 1st class (Russian Orthodox Church, 2006)
- Greece: Chevalier of the Order of the Chain of the Holy Sepulchre (Greek Orthodox Church of Jerusalem, 2000)

Titles

- Honorary Citizen of
  - Russia: Sverdlovsk Oblast (2010, posthumous)
  - Russia: Kazan (2005)
  - Russia: Samara Oblast (2006)
  - Armenia: Yerevan (2002)
  - Turkmenistan: Turkmenistan (1993)
  - Greece: Corfu (1994)

== See also ==
- History of Russia (1991–present)#"Shock therapy"
- History of the Soviet Union
- Shock Doctrine
- Someone Still Loves You Boris Yeltsin
- Spinning Boris, film based upon the story of American consultants advising the campaign

== Sources and further reading ==
- Aron, Leon (2000). Yeltsin: A Revolutionary Life. New York: St. Martin's Press. ISBN 978-0312251857.
- Aslund, Anders. Russia's capitalist revolution: why market reform succeeded and democracy failed (2007) excerpt
- Barnes, A. "Property, Power, and the Presidency: Ownership Policy Reform and Russian Executive–Legislative Relations, 1990–1999" Communist and Post-Communist Politics 34#1 (2001): 39–61.
- Barylski, Robert V. The Soldier in Russian Politics: Duty, Dictatorship, and Democracy under Gorbachev and Yeltsin (Routledge, 2018).
- Bialer, Seweryn. "The Yeltsin Affair: The Dilemma of the Left in Gorbachev's Revolution." Politics, Society, and Nationality Inside Gorbachev's Russia (Routledge, 2019) pp. 91–119.
- Biryukov, N., & S. Sergeyev. Russian Politics in Transition: Institutional Conflict in a Nascent Democracy (Ashgate, 1997).
- Boltunova, Ekaterina. "The President has entered the building! The Boris Yeltsin Presidential Center and memorial tradition in contemporary Russia." Ab Imperio 2017.3 (2017): 165–193. online
- Breslauer, George W. Gorbachev and Yeltsin as leaders (Cambridge UP, 2002).
- Breslauer, George W. "Personalism versus proceduralism: Boris Yeltsin and the institutional fragility of the Russian system." Russia in the New Century (Routledge, 2018) pp. 35–58.
- Brown, Archie et al. Gorbachev, Yeltsin, and Putin: political leadership in Russia's transition (2002) online
- Brown, Archie, and Lilia Shevtsova, eds. Gorbachev, Yeltsin, and Putin: political leadership in Russia's transition (Carnegie Endowment, 2013) excerpt.
- Colton, Timothy J. (2008). Yeltsin: A Life. New York: Basic Books. ISBN 978-0-465-01271-8.
- Colton, Timothy J. "Boris Yeltsin, Russia's all-thumbs democrat." Patterns in post-Soviet leadership (Routledge, 2019) pp. 49–74.
- Depoy, Erik. "Boris Yeltsin and the 1996 Russian presidential election." Presidential Studies Quarterly 26.4 (1996): 1140–1164. online
- Doder, Dusko; Branson, Louise (1990). Gorbachev: Heretic in the Kremlin. London: Futura. ISBN 978-0708849408.
- Ellison, Herbert J. Boris Yeltsin and Russia's democratic transformation (2006) online
- Evans, Alfred B. (1994). "Yel'tsin and Russian Nationalism". The Soviet and Post-Soviet Review. 21 (1): 29–43. doi:10.1163/187633294X00089.
- Forden, Geoffrey. "Reducing a Common Danger." Policy Analysis Paper (CATO #399, 2001) online
- Gill, Graeme. "The Yeltsin Era." in Routledge Handbook of Russian Politics and Society (Routledge, 2015) pp 3–12.
- Goldgeier, James. "Bill and Boris: A Window Into a Most Important Post-Cold War Relationship (August 2018)." Texas National Security Review (2018). online
- Jackson, Camille. "Legislation as an Indicator of Free Press in Russia: Patterns of Change from Yeltsin to Putin." Problems of Post-communism 63.5–6 (2016): 354–366. online
- Kagarlitsky, Boris. Russia Under Yeltsin and Putin: Neo-Liberal Autocracy (2002)
- Kimura, Hiroshi. Japanese-Russian Relations Under Gorbachev and Yeltsin (Routledge, 2016).
- Lane, David. "Political elites under Gorbachev and Yeltsin in the early period of transition: a reputational and analytical study." in Patterns in Post-Soviet Leadership (Routledge, 2019) pp. 29–47.
- Lynch, Allen C. "The influence of regime type on Russian foreign policy toward “the West,” 1992–2015." Communist and Post-Communist Studies 49.1 (2016): 101–111. online
- Malinova, Olga. "Political Uses of the Great Patriotic War in Post-Soviet Russia from Yeltsin to Putin." in War and Memory in Russia, Ukraine and Belarus (Palgrave Macmillan, Cham, 2017) pp. 43–70.
- Marples, David R. The collapse of the Soviet Union, 1985–1991 (Routledge, 2016).
- Mason, David S., and Svetlana Sidorenko-Stephenson. "Public opinion and the 1996 elections in Russia: Nostalgic and statist, yet pro-market and pro-Yeltsin." Slavic Review 56.4 (1997): 698–717 online.
- Medvedev, Toy. Post-Soviet Russia: a journey through the Yeltsin era (Columbia UP, 2000) ISBN 023150263X
- Minaev, Boris. Boris Yeltsin: The Decade that Shook the World (2015), detailed popular biography based on numerous interviews excerpt
- O'Brien, Thomas A. "The role of the transitional leader: A comparative analysis of Adolfo Suárez and Boris Yeltsin." Leadership 3.4 (2007): 419–432; compares Suárez of Spain.
- Ostrovsky, Alexander. Глупость или измена? Расследование гибели СССР. (Stupidity or treason? Investigation of the death of the USSR.) Archived 30 August 2022 at the Wayback Machine М.: Форум, Крымский мост-9Д, 2011. – 864 с. ISBN 978-5-89747-068-6.
- Ostrovsky, Alexander. Расстрел «Белого дома». Чёрный октябрь 1993. (The shooting of the "White House". Black October 1993.) Archived 31 May 2021 at the Wayback Machine – М.: «Книжный мир», 2014. – 640 с. ISBN 978-5-8041-0637-0
- Rivera, David W., and Sharon Werning Rivera. "Yeltsin, Putin, and Clinton: presidential leadership and Russian democratization in comparative perspective." Perspectives on Politics (2009): 591–610 online Archived 2 May 2021 at the Wayback Machine.
- Satter, David. The Less you know, the better you sleep. Russia's road to terror and dictatorship under Yeltsin and Putin (Yale University Press, 2016).
- Shevtsova, Lilia. Russia lost in transition: the Yeltsin and Putin legacies (2007) online
- Shevtsova, Lilia. Yeltsin's Russia: Myths and Reality. Washington: Carnegie Endowment for International Peace, 1999. excerpt Archived 1 November 2021 at the Wayback Machine
- Skinner, Kiron, et al. The Strategy of Campaigning: Lessons from Ronald Reagan and Boris Yeltsin (U of Michigan Press, 2010).
- Smith, Kathleen E. Mythmaking in the new Russia: politics and memory during the Yeltsin era (2002) online
- Spohr, Kristina, and Kaarel Piirimäe. "With or without Russia? The Boris, Bill and Helmut Bromance and the harsh realities of securing Europe in the post-wall world, 1990–1994." Diplomacy & Statecraft 33.1 (2022): 158–193.
- Stanger, Allison K. "Courting the Generals: The Impact of Russia's Constitutional Crisis on Yeltsin's Foreign Policy." Russia and Eastern Europe After Communism (Routledge, 2019) pp. 297–313. online
- Strickland, David A. "Overriding Democracy: American Intervention in Yeltsin's 1996 Reelection Campaign." Footnotes: A Journal of History 4 (2020): 166–181. online
- Talbott, Strobe. "Clinton and Yeltsin." Diplomatic History 42.4 (2018): 568–571.
- Yeltsin, Boris. Against the Grain. (London: Jonathan Cape, 1990), a primary source.
- Yeltsin, Boris. The Struggle for Russia. (New York: Times Books, 1994), a primary source. online
- Zezina, M.R. et al. A Man Of Change – A study of the political life of Boris Yeltsin (2014) online

Party political offices
Preceded by Yakov Ryabov	First Secretary of the Sverdlovsk Regional Committee of the Communist Party; 2 November 1976 – 18 April 1985	Succeeded by Yuri Petrov
Preceded by Viktor Grishin	First Secretary of the Moscow City Committee of the Communist Party; 23 December 1985 – 11 November 1987	Succeeded by Lev Zaykov
Political offices
Preceded by Vitaly Vorotnikov	Chairman of the Presidium of the Supreme Soviet of the Russian SFSR; 29 May 1990 – 10 July 1991	Succeeded by Ruslan Khasbulatov; Acting
Preceded by Himself as Chairman of the Presidium of the Supreme Soviet of the Russian SFSR	President of the Russian SFSR; 10 July 1991 – 25 December 1991	Succeeded by Himself as President of the Russian Federation
Preceded by Oleg Lobov; Acting as Chairman of the Council of Ministers – Government of the Russian SFSR	Head of Government of the Russian SFSR as President of the Russian SFSR; 6 November 1991 – 25 December 1991	Succeeded by Himself; Acting as President of the Russian Federation
Preceded by Himself as President of the Russian SFSR	President of the Russian Federation; 25 December 1991 – 31 December 1999	Succeeded by Vladimir Putin
Preceded by Himself; Acting as President of the Russian SFSR	Head of Government of the Russian Federation as President of the Russian Federation; 25 December 1991 – 15 June 1992	Succeeded by Yegor Gaidar; Acting as Prime Minister of the Russian Federation
Preceded by Konstantin Kobetz	Minister of Defence of Russia; Acting; 16 March 1992 – 18 May 1992	Succeeded by Pavel Grachev
