= Candidates in the 1991 Russian presidential election =

1991 Russian presidential candidates

This article contains the list of candidates associated with the 1991 Russian presidential election.

== Registered candidates ==
Candidates for president are listed in Russian alphabetical order.

Presidential candidate name, age, political party	Political offices	Vice Presidential candidate	Campaign
Vadim Bakatin (53); Independent (Note: Member of the Communist Party)	Interior Minister of the USSR (1988–1990)	Ramazan Abdulatipov; Chairman of the Soviet of Nationalities (1990–1993)	(campaign)
Boris Yeltsin (60); Independent (Note: Supported by Democratic Russia, Democratic, Republican, Social Democratic parties)	Chairman of the Supreme Soviet of Russia (1990–1991)	Alexander Rutskoy; Member of the Supreme Soviet of Russia (1990–1991)	(campaign)
Vladimir Zhirinovsky (45); Liberal Democratic Party	Leader of the Liberal Democratic Party of the Soviet Union (1989–1992)	Andrey Zavidiya; Entrepreneur	(campaign)
Albert Makashov (53); Independent	People's Deputy of the USSR (1989–1991), commander of the Volga–Ural Military District (1989–1991)	Alexey Sergeyev; Member of the CPSU Central Committee (1990–1991), economist	(campaign)
Nikolai Ryzhkov (61); Communist Party of the RSFSR (Communist Party of the Soviet Union)	Premier of the Soviet Union (1985–1990)	Boris Gromov; People's Deputy of the USSR (1989–1991), commander of the Kiev Military District (1989–1990)	(campaign)
Aman Tuleyev (47); Independent	Chairman of the Kemerovo Oblast Council of People's Deputies (1990–1993)	Viktor Bocharov; People's Deputy of Russia (1990–1993), construction executive	(campaign)

== Candidates that failed to register ==
- Boris Gromov, military veteran; ended his campaign and was instead registered as Ryzhkov's (who was nominated by the Communist Party of the Soviet Union) vice-presidential candidate
- Roman Kalinin (nominated by Libertarian Party), co-head of the Moscow Gay & Lesbian Alliance (ineligible, younger than the minimum age of 35)
- V. Potemkin (nominated by League of Independent Scientists of the RSFSR)
- Aleksei Alekseyevich Sergeyev (nominated by Communists of Russia and the Initiative Congress of Russian Communists), ended his campaign and was instead registered as Makashov's vice-presidential candidate
- Lev Ubozhko, former dissident, leader of the Conservative Party of Russia
- Vladimir V. Voronin, leader of "Centrist Bloc of political parties"

== Possible candidates who did not run ==
- Mikhail Bocharov, people's deputy of Russia, 1990 premier candidate
- Svetlana Goryacheva, deputy chairwoman of the Supreme Soviet of Russia
- Ivan Polozkov, head of the Communist Party of the Russian Soviet Federative Socialist Republic
- Anatoly Sobchak, chairman of the Leningrad city council (ran for mayor instead)
