= Presidency of Boris Yeltsin =

Boris Yeltsin's years as President of Russia

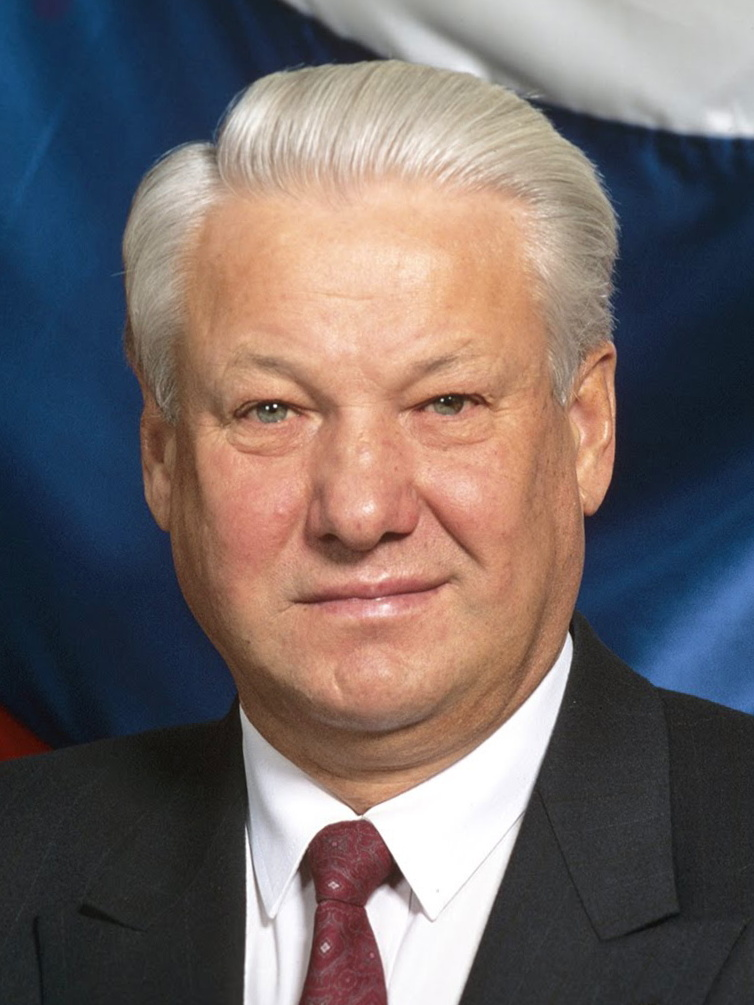
- Official portrait, 1992
- Presidency of Boris Yeltsin; 10 July 1991 – 31 December 1999
- President: Boris Yeltsin
- Party: Independent
- Election: 1991; 1996
- Seat: Moscow Kremlin
- Emblem of the President

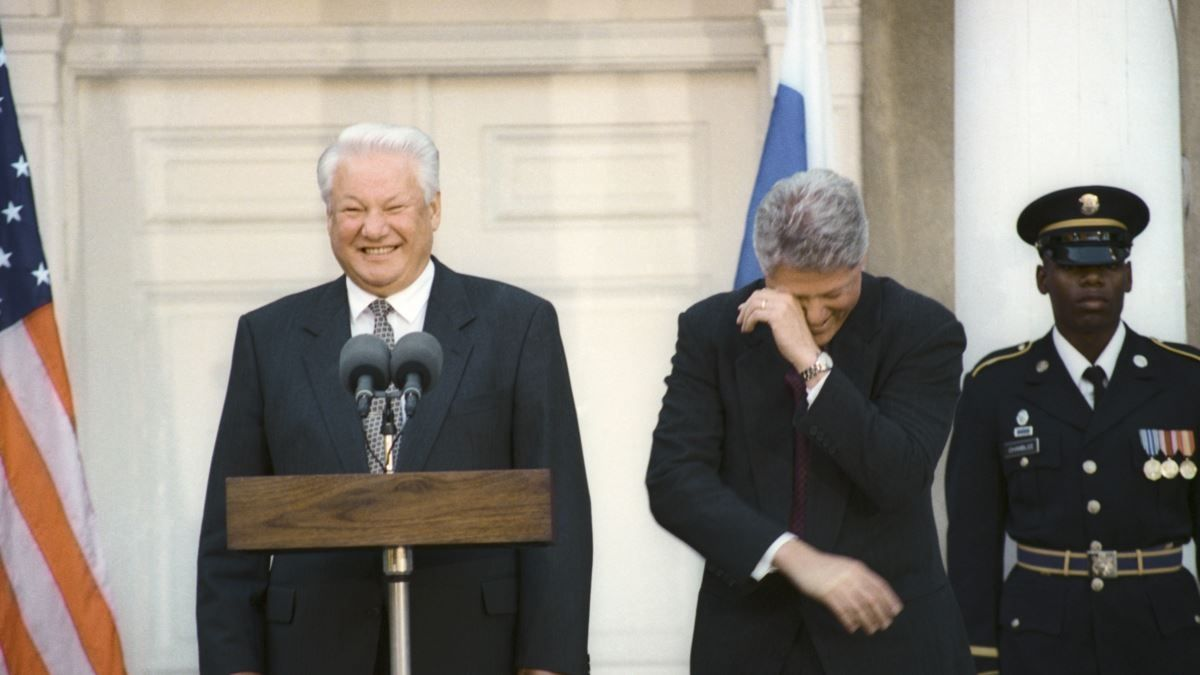
At a press conference with American President Bill Clinton. 24 October 1995

Boris Yeltsin's presidency began with his first inauguration on 10 July 1991, and ended on 31 December 1999 when he announced his resignation. A referendum held on 17 March 1991 approved the creation of the post of president of Russia; Yeltsin was elected Russia's first president in a presidential election held on 12 June 1991.

During his first term, Yeltsin implemented reforms including economic shock therapy and nationwide privatization to transform Russia's command economy into a market economy. The country faced a severe economic downturn following the reforms as well as persistent low oil and commodity prices, the emergence of currencies which replaced the Soviet rouble in the former Soviet Union, and an increase in public debt with the depreciation of the Russian rouble. These issues affected not only Russia, but the economies of other post-Soviet states. Within a few years of his presidency, many of Yeltsin's initial supporters started to criticize his leadership, including then vice president Alexander Rutskoy. Tensions with the Russian parliament culminated in the 1993 Russian constitutional crisis after Yeltsin ordered the unconstitutional dissolution of the parliament; as a result the parliament attempted to impeach Yeltsin. In October 1993, troops loyal to Yeltsin stopped an armed uprising outside of the parliament building, following which a new constitution was introduced and Yeltsin deepened his efforts to transform the economy. In 1994, Yeltsin launched a war against Chechen separatists in an attempt to restore federal control of the region, which ended in a Russian withdrawal two years later.

During his second term, the government defaulted on its debt and the rouble collapsed in the 1998 Russian financial crisis. On 31 December 1999, Yeltsin announced his resignation, with his chosen successor, then prime minister Vladimir Putin, succeeding him as acting president who then was elected to his first presidential term following an election held on 26 March 2000. Yeltsin left office widely unpopular with the Russian population.

== The election and inauguration ==
On 12 June 1991, Yeltsin was elected as the first president of the Russian Federation, receiving 45,552,041 votes, representing 57.30 percent of the number who took part in the vote, and well ahead of Nikolai Ryzhkov, who, despite the support of the federal authorities, received only 16.85%. Together with Boris Yeltsin was elected a vice-president, Alexander Rutskoi. After the elections, Boris Yeltsin began the struggle with the privileges of the range and the maintenance of Russia's sovereignty within the USSR.

These were the first in the history of Russian national presidential elections. On 10 July 1991, Boris Yeltsin brought an oath of allegiance to the people of Russia and the Russian Constitution and assumed the position of President of the Russian Federation. After taking the oath, he made a keynote speech, which began energetically and emotionally, understanding the solemnity of the time.

The first decree, which was signed by Yeltsin, was the decree "On urgent measures for the development of education in the Russian Federation." The document, prepared with the active participation of the Ministry of Education of the RSFSR, headed by ED Dnieper, outlined a number of measures to support, financially, the system of education, which were explicit declarative. Much of the declared in the decree have not been fulfilled, for example, promise to "send abroad each year for training, internships, training not less than 10 thousand students, post-graduate students, teachers and academic staff".

On 20 July 1991, Boris Yeltsin signed a decree No. 14 "On the termination of activity of organizational structures of political parties and mass social movements in state bodies, institutions and organizations of the Russian Federation", which has become one of the final chords policy of partization and dedeologization. Yeltsin began to negotiate the signing of a new union treaty with Mikhail Gorbachev and the leaders of other Soviet republics.

== First term ==
=== State Committee on the State of Emergency ===
On 19 August 1991, after the announcement of the creation of the State Committee on the State of Emergency and the isolation of Gorbachev in the Crimea, Yeltsin led the resistance to the Emergency Committee and made the Russian House of Soviets ("The White House") as the center of resistance. On the first day of events Yeltsin, speaking from a tank outside the White House, called the actions of the State Emergency Committee a coup, then issued a number of decrees on non-recognition of the State Emergency Committee action. On 23 August, Yeltsin signed a decree suspending the activities of the RSFSR, and on 6 November, on the termination of the Communist Party of the Soviet Union.

After the failure of the Emergency Committee, and Gorbachev has returned to Moscow to negotiate a new Union Treaty are deadlocked, and Gorbachev finally began to lose control levers, which are gradually retreating to Yeltsin and heads of other union republics.

=== Dissolution of the Soviet Union ===
In December 1991, Boris Yeltsin, Soviet president Gorbachev held a secret meeting with Ukrainian President, Leonid Kravchuk, and Chairman of the Supreme Soviet of Belarus, Stanislav Shushkevich, which led to negotiations on the establishment of the Commonwealth of Independent States. On 8 December 1991, the presidents of Ukraine, Russia and the chairman of the Supreme Soviet of Belarus signed the Belavezha Agreement on creation of the CIS, which states that "the USSR, as a subject of international law and a geopolitical reality ceased to exist". The agreement was signed despite the referendum on preserving the Soviet Union, which took place 17 March 1991.

On 12 December, the agreement was ratified by the Supreme Soviet of Russia. The Russian parliament ratified the document by a large majority: 188 votes "for" with 6 votes "against", and 7 votes were "abstained". The legitimacy of the ratification caused doubts among some members of the Russian parliament, since according to the Constitution (Fundamental Law) of the RSFSR in 1978 consideration of the documents are in the exclusive jurisdiction of the Congress of People's Deputies, as it affects the character of the Republic as part of USSR and thus entailed changes in the Russian constitution. On 21 December, the majority of the union republics joined to the Commonwealth after they signed the Alma-Ata Declarations and the Protocol to the Agreement on the establishment of the CIS.

Alexander Lukashenko believes that the most negative consequence of the collapse of the USSR was the formation of a unipolar world. According to Stanislav Shushkevich in 1996, Yeltsin said that he regretted signing the Bialowieza agreements. On 24 December, the President of the Russian Federation informed the Secretary General of the United Nations that the membership of the Soviet Union replacing by the Russian Federation which continues the membership in all organs of the United Nations (including membership in the UN Security Council). Thus, Russia is considered an original member of the United Nations (since 24 October 1945), along with Ukraine (SSR) and Belarus (Byelorussian SSR).

On 25 December 1991, Boris Yeltsin, was full of presidential power in Russia in connection with the resignation of Soviet president Mikhail Gorbachev and the actual collapse of the USSR. Following the resignation of Mikhail Gorbachev, Boris Yeltsin had transferred his residence from the Russia's White House to the Kremlin and he received the so-called nuclear suitcase.

In April 1992, 4th Congress of People's Deputies three times refused to ratify Belovezhskoe agreement and deleted from the text of the Russian Constitution mention of the constitution and laws of the USSR, which subsequently became one of the causes of the confrontation of the Congress of People's Deputies with President Yeltsin and later led to the dispersal of the Congress in October 1993. The USSR Constitution and laws of the USSR continued to be referred to in articles 4, 102 and 147 of the Constitution of the Russian Federation – Russian (RSFSR) in 1978 up to 25 December 1993, when in force adopted by a referendum the Constitution of the Russian Federation, which contained no mention of the Constitution and laws of the USSR.

In September 1992, a group of People's Deputies, headed by Sergei Baburin sent to the Constitutional Court of the Russian Federation a petition to examine the constitutionality of the Supreme Soviet of the RSFSR of 12 December 1991 "On ratification of the Agreement establishing the Commonwealth of Independent States".

=== Russian constitutional crisis ===
On 10 December 1992, the day after the Congress of People's Deputies did not approve the candidacy of Yegor Gaidar as Prime Minister, Boris Yeltsin issued a sharp criticism of the Congress of People's Deputies and tried to disrupt their work, calling on his supporters to leave the meeting hall. A political crisis began. After the talks, Boris Yeltsin and Ruslan Khasbulatov, Valery Zorkin and multi-voting, the Congress of People's Deputies on 12 December, adopted a resolution on the stabilisation of the constitutional system and Viktor Chernomyrdin was appointed as Prime Minister.

After the eighth Congress of People's Deputies, which quashed the decision of the stabilisation of the constitutional system and the decisions that undermine the independence of the government and the Central Bank, on 20 March 1993, Boris Yeltsin, delivered a televised address to the nation, he announced that it has signed a decree on the introduction of "special operation mode". The next day, the Supreme Council appealed to the Constitutional Court, calling Yeltsin's appeal "an attack on the constitutional foundations of the Russian state". The Constitutional Court of the Russian Federation, still not having signed the decree, and Yeltsin found the actions associated with the televised address, unconstitutional, and found that the reasons for his dismissal. The Supreme Council convened IX (Extraordinary) Congress of People's Deputies. However, as it turned out after a few days, in fact, it signed another decree contains no gross violations of the Constitution. On 28 March, the Congress attempted to remove Yeltsin from his office as president. Speaking at a rally on Vasilyevsky Spusk, Yeltsin vowed not to implement the decision of the Congress if it will still be accepted. However, over the impeachment only 617 deputies has voted out of 1033, with the necessary 689 majority votes.

The next day, after failing impeachment Congress of People's Deputies appointed 25 April, All-Russian referendum on four issues: the confidence to President Yeltsin, on the approval of its socio-economic policies of the early presidential elections and early elections of people's deputies. Boris Yeltsin called on his supporters to vote "yes four" themselves supporters were inclined to vote "yes-no-yes." According to the results of the referendum of confidence he received 58.7% of votes, while 53.0% voted in favor of the economic reforms. On the issue of early presidential elections and people's deputies "for" votes, respectively, 49.5% and 67.2% took part in the vote, however, legally significant decisions on these matters have been adopted (as, according to the laws in force, for this " for "we had to speak out more than half of all eligible voters). Contradictory results of the referendum were interpreted by Yeltsin and his entourage in their favor.

After the referendum, Yeltsin focused its efforts on the development and adoption of the new Constitution. On 30 April, in the newspaper "Izvestia" was published on the presidential draft constitution on 18 May, it was announced the launch of the Constitutional Council, and on 5 June, Constitutional Assembly gathered for the first meeting in Moscow. After the referendum, Yeltsin virtually ceased all business contacts with the leadership of the Supreme Council, although some continued to sign some time taken them laws, and has lost confidence in the vice-president Alexander Rutskoi and freed him from all offices, and on 1 September, he was suspended from office on suspicion of corruption.

=== Press Freedom in Russia ===
After the fall of the Communist Party and the collapse of the USSR, in the initial period (1991–1993), The presidency of Boris Yeltsin, the level of freedom in the media has remained at the level of 1990–1991.

=== First Chechen War ===
Officially, the conflict is defined as "measures to maintain constitutional order," the military action called "first Chechen war", less "Russian-Chechen" or "Russian-Caucasian war". The conflict and the events preceding it were characterized by a large number of casualties, the military and law enforcement agencies, noted the facts of ethnic cleansing of non-Chechen population in Chechnya.

Although certain military successes of the Russian Interior Ministry and the Russian Armed Forces, the outcome of this conflict was the withdrawal of Russian troops, the massive destruction and casualties, the de facto independence of Chechnya before the second Chechen war and a wave of terror that swept across Russia.

With the beginning of perestroika in the various republics of the Soviet Union, including in the Chechen-Ingush Republic stepped various nationalist movements. One of these organizations was the established in 1990 National Congress of the Chechen People (NCCP), aims to exit Chechnya from the Soviet Union and the creation of an independent Chechen state. It was headed by a former general of the Soviet Air Force, Dzhokhar Dudayev.

On 8 June 1991, at the II session of the NCCP, Dudayev proclaimed the independence of the Chechen Republic Nokhchi-cho. Thus, the country has developed a dual power.

During the "August Putsch" in Moscow, the leadership of the Chechen Republic supported the Emergency Committee. In response to the events from September 6, 1991, Dudayev declared the dissolution of the national government agencies, accusing Russia of "colonial" policy. On the same day Dudaev Guardsmen storm seized the building of the Supreme Council, the television station and Radio House. More than 40 deputies were beaten, and the chairman of the Grozny city council Vitali Kutsenko thrown out the window, as a result he died.

The Chairman of the RSFSR Supreme Soviet, Ruslan Khasbulatov, then sent them a telegram: "I am pleased to have learned of the resignation of the Armed Forces of the Republic." After the collapse of the Soviet state, Dzhokhar Dudayev declared the final outlet of Chechnya from the Russian Federation.

On 27 October 1991, in the country under the control of separatists held presidential and parliamentary elections. President of the Republic became Dzhokhar Dudayev. These elections have been declared illegal by the Russian Federation's officials.

On 7 November 1991, Russian President Boris Yeltsin signed a decree "On the state of emergency in the Chechen-Ingush Republic (1991)". The situation in the country has deteriorated – the supporters of separatists surrounded the building of the Interior Ministry and the KGB, military camps, blocked rail and air hub. In the end, the introduction of state of emergency was thwarted, the decree "On state of emergency in the Chechen-Ingush Republic (1991)" was canceled on 11 November, three days after its signing, after a heated discussion at the session of the Supreme Soviet of the RSFSR and Republic began the withdrawal of Russian military forces and units of the Interior Ministry finalized by the summer of 1992. Separatists start capturing and looting of military depots.

Dudayev's forces got a lot of weapons. In June 1992, Defense Minister Pavel Grachev ordered to transfer half of Dudayev in existence in the country of weapons and ammunition. According to him, it was a necessary step, since a significant part of the "transmission" of weapons have been seized, and take the rest there was no way due to the lack of soldiers and trains. Even then, when Dudayev stopped paying taxes to the Russian budget and prohibited employees from entering the Russian special services in the republic, the federal government is officially continued to transfer money to Dudayev. In 1993, the Kaliningrad region has been allocated 140 million roubles to 10.5 billion roubles to Chechnya.

Russian oil until 1994 continued to arrive in Chechnya. Dudayev did not pay for it, and resold abroad. Dudayev also got a lot of weapons: 2 rocket launchers ground troops, 42 tanks, 34 infantry fighting vehicles, 14 armored personnel carriers, 14 light armored tractor, 260 aircraft, 57 of thousands of small appliances and many other weapons.

On 30 November 1994, Boris Yeltsin decided to send troops to Chechnya and signed a secret decree No. 2137 "On measures to restore constitutional law and order in the Chechen Republic," and the Chechen conflict began.

On 11 December 1994, on the basis of Yeltsin's decree "On measures to curb the activities of illegal armed groups on the territory of the Chechen Republic and in the zone of the Ossetian-Ingush conflict" began sending troops to Chechnya. Many ill-considered actions have led to heavy casualties among both military and civilian populations: tens of thousands of people were killed and hundreds of thousands were injured. It often happens that during a military operation, or shortly before it came from Moscow ordered the rebound. This allowed the Chechen rebels to regroup. The first storm of Grozny was ill-conceived and led to heavy casualties: dead and missing over 1,500 people, 100 were captured Russian soldiers.

In June 1995, during the seizure of militias under the leadership of Shamil Basayev, hospitals and maternity hospital in Budennovsk, Yeltsin was in Canada, and decided not to stop the trip, providing an opportunity to Chernomyrdin to resolve the situation and negotiate with the militants, he returned only after all events, dismissed the heads of a number of law enforcement agencies and the governor of the Stavropol Territory. In August 1996, Chechen rebels drove the Federal troops from Grozny. After that Yeltsin signed the Khasavyurt agreements, which many regarded as treacherous.

=== Russian presidential election, 1996 ===
The presidential elections were held in Russia on 16 June 1996, with a second round on 3 July. The result was a victory for the incumbent president Boris Yeltsin, who ran as an independent candidate. Yeltsin defeated the Communist challenger Gennady Zyuganov in the run-off, receiving 54.4% of the vote. His inauguration ceremony took place on 9 August. There have been claims that the election was fraudulent, favouring Yeltsin.

== Second term ==
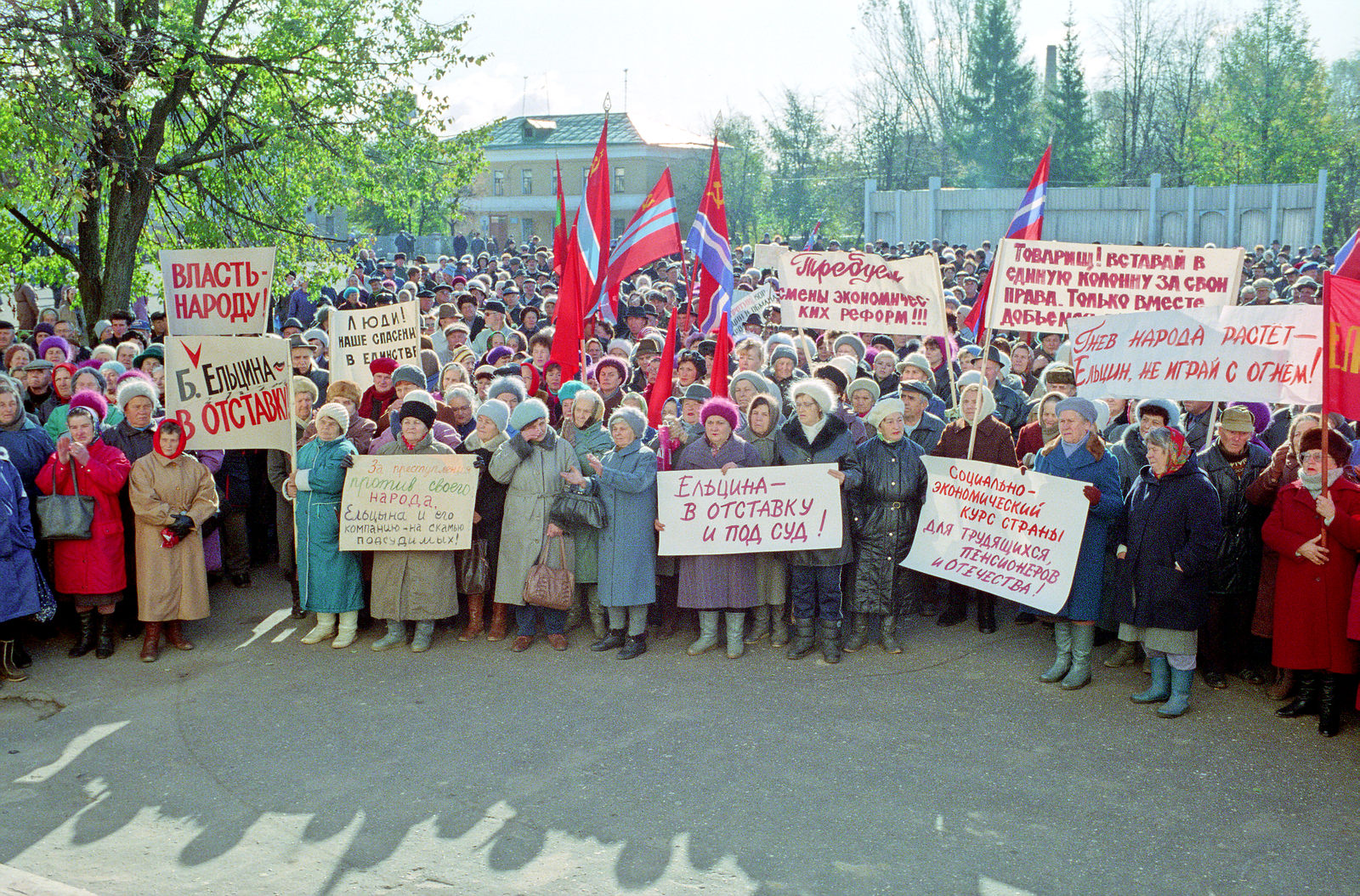
Anti-Yeltsin rally in Pereslavl-Zalessky in 1998

After the elections, Yeltsin was not seen in public due to his ill health for some time and did not appear before the voters. He appeared in public only at the inauguration ceremony on 9 August that took place in a highly abbreviated procedure because of Yeltsin's poor state of health.

On 5 November 1996, Yeltsin underwent surgery coronary artery bypass surgery of the heart, during which Viktor Chernomyrdin has performed the duties of President. Boris Yeltsin did not return to work until the beginning of 1997.

In 1997, Boris Yeltsin signed a decree on the rouble denomination, held talks in Moscow with Aslan Maskhadov and signed an agreement on the basic principles of peace and the relationship with the Chechen Republic.

In March 1998, the Government announced the resignation of Chernomyrdin, and on the third attempt, under threat of dissolution of the State Duma, the candidacy Sergei Kirienko held.

After the economic crisis of August 1998 when, two days after Yeltsin's emphatic statement on television that the devaluation of the rouble would not be devalued and the rouble was devalued by 4 times, he sacked Kiriyenko government and offered to return Chernomyrdin. 21 August 1998 at a meeting of the State Duma of the majority of MPs (248 out of 450) have called Yeltsin to resign voluntarily, in his support were only 32 deputies.

In September 1998, with the consent of the State Duma Boris Yeltsin appointed Yevgeny Primakov to the post of prime minister.

In May 1999, the State Duma tried unsuccessfully to raise the issue of impeachment of Yeltsin from office (five charges formulated by the initiators of the impeachment, mainly related to Yeltsin's actions during the first term). Before the vote to impeach, Yeltsin dismissed Primakov government, and then with the consent of the State Duma appointed Sergei Stepashin as Chairman of the Government. In August he dismissed Stepashin and submitted for approval the candidacy of Vladimir Putin (little-known at the time) and declared him his successor.

After the aggravation of the situation in Chechnya, the Tukhchar massacre, apartment bombings in Moscow, Buynaksk and Volgodonsk, Yeltsin at the suggestion of Putin decided to conduct a series of Chechen counter-terrorist operations. Putin's popularity increased, and at the end of 1999, Yeltsin decided to resign leaving Putin as acting president.

=== Resignation ===
On 31 December 1999, at 12 am Moscow time (which was repeated on the main channels for a few minutes before midnight, before the televised New Year) Yeltsin announced his resignation as President of the Russian Federation: "Dear friends! My dear! Today is the last time I address you with New Year's greetings. But that's not all. Today, the last time I address you as the President of Russia. I made the decision. Slowly and painfully pondered over it. Today, the last day of the outgoing century, I am resigning."

Yeltsin said that he was leaving not for health reasons, but on the totality of the problems, and apologized to the citizens of Russia.

Prime Minister Putin was appointed acting president, who immediately after the statement of Yeltsin about his own resignation sent a New Year message to the citizens of Russia. Putin on the same day signed a decree guaranteeing Yeltsin protection from prosecution, as well as significant financial benefits to him and his family.

"Dear friends! My dear! Today is the last time I address you with New Year's greetings. But that's not all. Today, the last time I address you as the President of Russia. I made the decision. Slowly and painfully pondered over it. Today, the last day of the outgoing century, I am resigning."

== Bibliography ==
- Yeltsin, Boris. Against the Grain. London: Jonathan Cape, 1990.
- Yeltsin, Boris. The Struggle for Russia. New York: Times Books, 1994.
- Shevtsova, Lilia. Yeltsin's Russia: Myths and Reality. Washington: Carnegie Endowment for International Peace, 1999.
- Байков В.Д. Ленинградские хроники: от послевоенных 50-х до "лихих 90-х". М. Литео, 2017. - 486 с., илл. — Baykov V.D. Leningrad chronicles: from the postwar fifties to the "wild nineties" ISBN 978-5-00071-516-1

== See also ==
- List of international presidential trips made by Boris Yeltsin
- Presidency of Dmitry Medvedev
- Presidency of Vladimir Putin
- Semibankirschina

Russian presidential administrations
Preceded by Office established	Yeltsin Presidency; 1991–1999	Succeeded by Vladimir Putin
