= Boris Yeltsin 1991 presidential campaign =

Boris Yeltsin presidential campaign, 1991
- Campaign: 1991 Russian presidential election
- Candidate: Boris Yeltsin; Chairman of the Supreme Soviet of Russia (1990–1991); People's Deputy of Russia (1990–1991); Deputy of the Supreme Soviet of Russia (1990–1991); Alexander Rutskoy; People's Deputy of Russia (1990–1991); Deputy of the Supreme Soviet of Russia (1990–1991)
- Affiliation: Independent
- Status: Registered candidate: 20 May 1991; Won election: 12 June 1991
- Key people: Gennady Burbulis (chairman); Aleksandr Muzykansky (chairman of national initiative group)

The 1991 presidential campaign of Boris Yeltsin, was the successful campaign by then-Chairman of the Supreme Soviet of Russia in Russia's first presidential election. Yeltsin ran as an independent candidate. His running mate was People's Deputy and former soldier Alexander Rutskoy.

Receiving more than 50% of the vote in the first round of the election, the Yeltsin-Rutskoy ticket won the election with an overwhelming margin over their closest competitors, the Ryzhkov-Gromov ticket. Thus Boris Yeltsin and Alexander Rutskoy were elected 1st President of Russia and 1st vice president of Russia respectively.

== Background ==
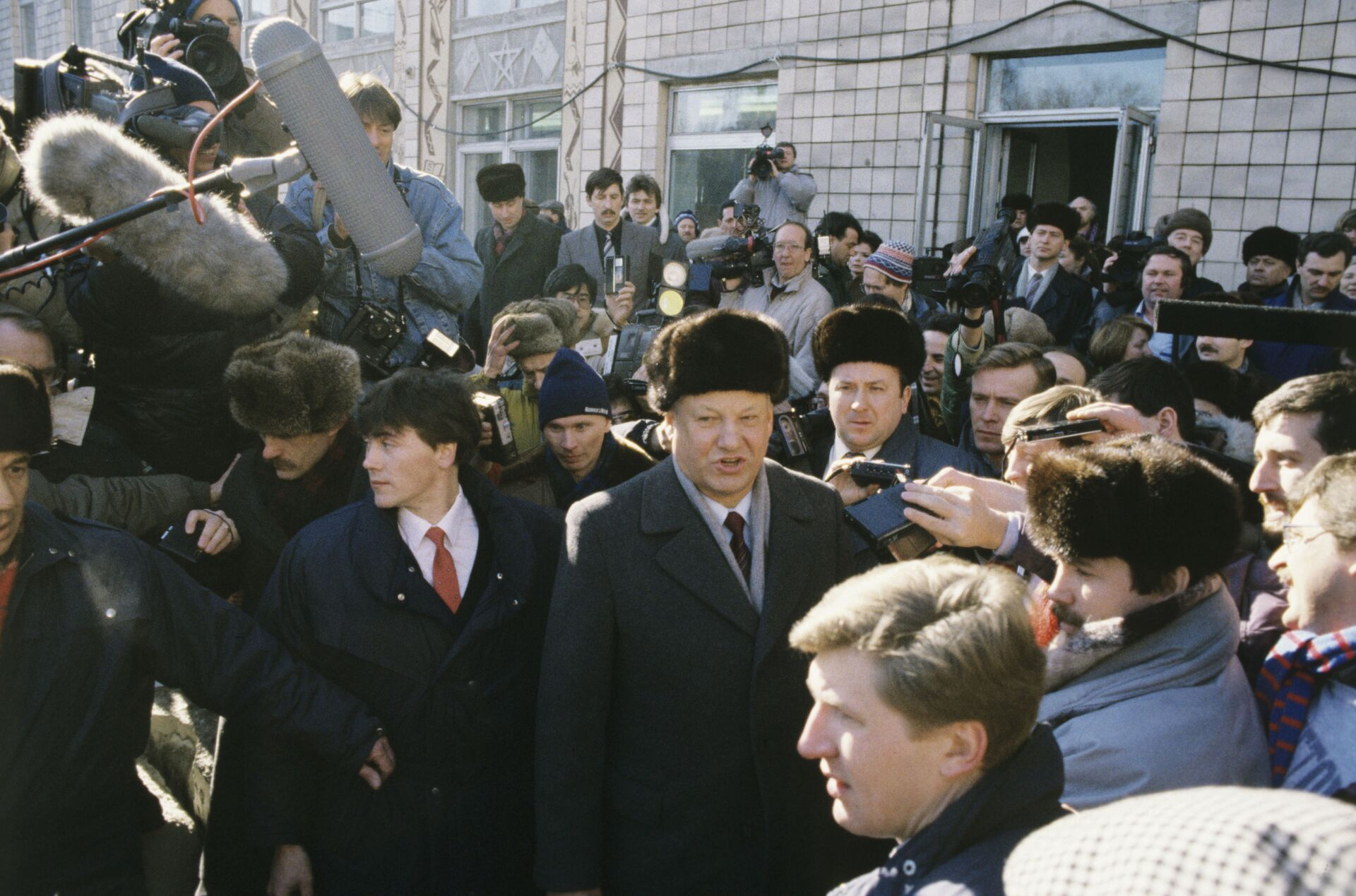
Yeltsin during the March 1991 referendum, campaigning in support of establishing a presidency

On March 17, 1991, the all-Russian referendum on the introduction of the post of President of Russia was held. More than 70% of citizens voted for the introduction of the post of President, elected by direct vote. On 24 April 1991, the Supreme Council of Russia adopted the law "On the President of the RSFSR".

Boris Yeltsin served as Chairman of the Supreme Soviet and was the head of the Russian SFSR. He had had strong favorability. Heading into the election, he was the most popular candidate. He was widely viewed to be the only candidate with a real chance to become president.

The alliances which would form the Democratic Russia apparatus which supported Yeltsin's candidacy, had been forged prior to his presidential candidacy, originally working in support of Yeltsin's successful push to create an office of the presidency.

== Campaign strategy ==
The leader of the RSFSR, Yeltsin essentially campaigned as an incumbent. Having a vast lead, Yeltsin opted to avoid engaging his opponents.

Yeltsin's support came not only from a liberal democratic base, but also from a broad coalition of a variety of social groups. Nevertheless, his core support came from a base which favored radical reforms. His greatest support was found in Russia's cities. He also found strong support among those who were most disadvantaged under the Soviet system.

While the campaign period was very brief, both Yeltsin and Rutskoy still traveled to many regions of Russia and held meetings with voters.

Yeltsin's campaign and its backers decided to conduct a low-key campaign. Rather than heightening emotions of voters, they sought to instead calm them. A key reason behind the decision to opt for a low-key campaign was a desire to avoid fatigue among voters. For instance, when Democratic Russia held rallies attended by several hundred thousand supporters each on May 20 and June 10 in Moscow's Manezh Square, rather than riling voters up about key issues, those speaking at the rallies spoke lightheartedly and expressed their confidence in Yeltsin's chances of winning the election. Steering largely away from issues, only occasional criticisms of Yeltsin's opponents and of the communist order were delivered at these events.

Organizers of Yeltsin's campaign had decided that they will wait until June before fully ramping up their efforts. They did this in the belief that Russians had become tired of politics, and that it would be off-putting to overly-campaign. With Yeltsin having a strong lead, they deemed it unnecessary to conduct much beyond a "minimal campaign".

Yeltsin made an effort to avoid creating optics of a direct association with the more extremist elements of the democratic movement. He wanted to avoid repulsing voters. On May 23, Yeltsin told Izvestia that he desired for the democrats to be less combative in their attacks on the center.

Rather than employing the sorts of frenzied rhetoric that his opponents were using, Yeltsin instead opted to act the part of a measured statesman during the campaign period. This was intended to solidify the perception of Yeltsin as a capable leader and enhance the dynamic in which he was running as a de facto incumbent. The economic crisis and the serious antikomintern (the mood in society) influenced Yeltsin's decision to adopt a more serious tone of rhetoric. In his campaign rhetoric Yeltsin made a conscious effort to refer to his fellow citizens as rossiiany (a term referring to all the people living in Russian territory) as opposed to russkiy (which, more specifically, tends to refer to ethnic Russians).

As part of the democratic opposition to the communist Soviet establishment, Yeltsin benefited from the fever pitch which anti-communist tensions had reached in Russia.

Yeltsin's campaign apparatus had immense access to printing resources, and, come the election, was able to flood the nation with posters and leaflets. Opponents, such as Vladimir Zhirinovsky, lacked access to comparable resources.

== Campaigning ==
Yeltsin was the only candidate of the democratic forces. Among the organizations that supported him were the Democratic Russia movement, the Democratic Party and the Social Democratic Party.

On April 27, Democratic Russia nominated Yeltsin as their candidate. On May 3, the RSFSR Social Democratic Party nominated Yeltsin at their national conference. The Social Democratic Party also nominated Galina Starovoytova to be Yeltsin's running mate if he were to accept their nomination. Yeltsin refused both nominations. Rather of accepting any one party's nomination, Yeltsin instead opted to run as an independent. However, while refusing their nominations, Yeltsin received support from both parties.

On April 29, during a meeting in Novokuznetsk with approximately 600 miners and local officials, Yeltsin took the opportunity to issue a number of promises aimed at earning the votes of miners. On the same day, Democratic Russia organized an event in Moscow in which thousands of supporters rallied for Yeltsin and collected signatures for his registration. Democratic Russia had been hoping to also organize a Red Square rally with a Moscow trade union organization, however, these plans fell apart due to the trade union objecting to some of the more radical slogans which Democratic Russia used, which called for the resignation of Gorbachev.

On May 16, an explosion occurred in the room being used to store the signatures being gathered for Yeltsin's candidacy at the Democratic Russia headquarters in Moscow. The Baltimore Sun called it "the first political bombing in the capital for more than a decade". Sovetskaya Rossiya placed blame on the Libertarian (Radical) Party of the Soviet Union for perpetrating the attack, however, they denied involvement.

Yeltsin was officially registered as a presidential candidate on May 20. A week afterwards, he embarked on a ten-day campaign tour. He started his campaign travels with a trip to Murmansk, where he was reported to have been hounded by enthusiastic crowds waving the flag of pre-revolutionary Russia and shouting "We love you, Boris Nikolaevich!". As he had on previous trips he had made to the distant regions of the Russian Federation, Yeltsin promised the local residents that his administration would devolve enough powers to the regions to enable them to solve their problems themselves. On this tour, Yeltsin subsequently traveled to Petrozavodsk, Voronezh, Perm, Chelyabinsk, Orenberg, and Sverdlovsk (the latter being Yeltsin's hometown and a strong bastion of pro-Yeltsin support).

Although Yeltsin had earlier promised to participate in debates, during the campaign he opted against it.

Two days before the election more than 20,000 supporters attended an afternoon rally in Moscow's Manezh Square. At the rally, chess champion Garry Kasparov delivered a speech encouraging a large turnout in support of Yeltsin. Democratic Russia leader Nikolai Travkin confidently spoke of Yeltsin's prospects.

Eduard Shevardnadze spoke in support of Yeltsin's candidacy on the eve of the election, calling his likely election a "step in the right direction".

In hopes of garnering the support of religious voters, on the eve of the election Yeltsin was interviewed on RSFSR state radio by Orthodox priests Vyacheslav Polosin (who was also a deputy of the Supreme Soviet and the cofounder of the Russian Christian Democratic Movement).

On the day of the election Yeltsin's campaign deployed a vast number of poll watchers to observe voting stations across the country, in order to keep an eye out for any voter fraud that the Communist Party might conduct against him.

=== Running mate selection ===
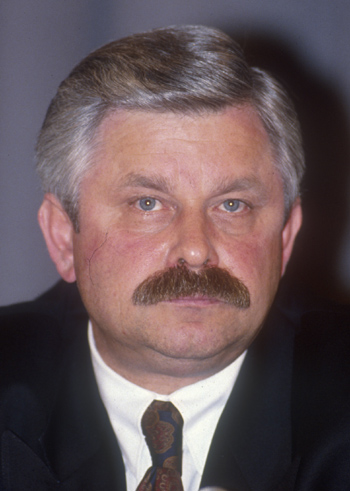
Yeltsin's running mate Alexander Rutskoy

In May 1991, speculation grew about who Yeltsin was going to pick as his running mate. Potential candidates were Vadim Bakatin, Gennady Burbulis, Dmitri Volkogonov, Gavriil Popov, Anatoly Sobchak, Galina Starovoytova, Sergey Shakhray, and Vladimir Bukovsky.

It was reported that Yeltsin had reached an agreement with Bakatin for him to serve as his running mate, but that Bakatin had backed out after being convinced by Mikhail Gorbachev to instead challenge Yeltsin for the presidency. According to Yeltsin, until the last minute he had intended to choose between his two closest associates at time, which were Ruslan Khasbulatov and Gennady Burbulis. However, he ultimately felt they lacked charisma and were too unpopular with voters. Despite their key role in his campaign effort, Yeltsin did not consult the leaders of Democratic Russia about his running mate selection.

On May 18, 1991 (the last day when it was still possible for him to choose a running mate), Yeltsin selected Alexander Rutskoy as his running mate. Rutskoy was a celebrated military veteran, a People's Deputy, and the leader of the newly-formed Communists for Democracy movement.

The choice of Rutskoy was unexpected to many. Most of the candidates that had been widely anticipated were from the same political camp as Yeltsin. Rutskoy had not previously been a political ally of Yeltsin's. A prominent figure in the Communist camp, Rutskoy was a former ally of Gorbachev. He was also considered to be more conservative than Gorbachev. However, he had also shown an openness to democratic reforms. Yeltsin selected Rutskoy after deciding that he wanted a runningmate that could broaden support for the ticket. He hoped that Rutskoy's inclusion on the ticket could attract some conservative (anti-reform) voters, such as moderate-leaning members of the Communist Party, members of the military, and nationalists.

While an unexpected choice, Rutskoy was not an extreme choice. He was a well-regarded Hero of the Soviet Union. He carried a strong military reputation, which was important to Yeltsin. Yeltsin's strongest opponent, Nikolai Ryzhkov, had selected Boris Gromov, a military hero, to serve as his running mate. Yeltsin hoped that Ryzhkov would help him to attract the many conservative Russian voters who desired stability in society.

Rutskoy hoped that his inclusion on the ticket would provide a ticket balance, and allow Yeltsin to attract votes from moderate communists. Yeltsin praised Rutskoy for his ability to understand the needs of military veterans and for his creation of the "Communists for Democracy" movement.

Rutskoy declared that he would continue to be a member of the Central Committee of the Communist Party of Russia, but that he still disagreed with its leadership (particularly with Ivan Polizkov). He encouraged all who wished to see Russia's greatness restored to vote for him and Yeltsin.

Soon after his selection, Rutskoy came under fire amid allegations that he had been formerly supported by chauvinistic organizations such as Pamyat' and Otechestvo, and that he had been a strong opponent of the late academician Andrei Sakharov. Rutskoy defended himself by stating that while he had been one of the founders of Otechestvo (which he argued had been started as a patriotic association), he rejected the chauvinistic views which it had since adopted. Rutskoy also said that he only disagreed with Andrei Sakharov over Sakharov's claim that the Soviet air force had bombed its own soldiers in Afghanistan, but that he otherwise had great respect for Sakharov.

=== Election result ===
Yeltsin received 58.6% of the votes in the first round of the election, while the runner-up, Nikolai Ryzhkov, scored 17.2%. Having received more than 50% of the votes cast, Yeltsin had won the presidency outright in the first round, negating the need for a runoff to take place.

Yeltsin received his greatest level of support in Sverdlovsk Oblast (84.8%). His support was also extremely strong in other regions, receiving 70% in Chechen and Ingush Republic, Perm and Chelyabinsk Oblasts and in Moscow, between 65 and 70% in Dagestan, Nizhny Novgorod and Samara Oblasts, Khanty-Mansi and Yamalo-Nenets Autonomous Okrugs and Leningrad. He saw his lowest share of votes in the Republic of Tuva (where he took third place, with 15.25% of the vote) and also in three national regions (Altai Republic, North Ossetian Republic and Agin-Buryat Autonomous Okrug) where he was supported by less than 30% of voters.

== Platform ==
While Yeltsin had outlined some policy proposals during his campaign, he kept many of his positions intentionally vague. In order to appeal to a broader array of voters, Yeltsin mostly avoided answering questions about his specific political ideology. In general, Yeltsin was seen as a democratic-minded reformist. Yeltsin unveiled his campaign's platform at a June 1 meeting of the Democratic Russia movement. He pledged to improve Russian living conditions within a two-year timeframe.

As president, Yeltsin planned to pursue greater sovereignty and overall self-governance for the RSFSR. He called for many aspects of Russia's government would be transferred from the purview of the Soviet Union to the government of the RSFSR. He intended to obtain ultimate control over finance policy in the RSFSR territory and to pursue a transfer of all RSFSR industries, including military plants, to jurisdiction of the RSFSR government jurisdiction. He intended to pursue a sovereign foreign policy. He also proposed market reforms, supporting a rapid switch to a market economy. During his campaign, Yeltsin also pledged that his government would return all property that had been confiscated from the Russian Orthodox Church.

Yeltsin's stance on keeping the Soviet Union's military unified was a reversal of his earlier stance that the RSFSR should consider forming its own army. Yeltsin stated that he believed that the Soviet Union's military needed to be unified, well-armed, and highly capable (a stance which he had adopted after the January 13 attack in Vilnius). Yeltsin criticized the poor living standards experienced by military personnel and the difficulties faced by workers in the military-industrial sector. He also opposed using the army for domestic policing. He was the only candidate to support depoliticization of the armed forces. On June 9 in Sverdlovsk, Yeltsin declared that he would make Russia's military industries fund themselves.

== Campaign organizations ==
The organizations which facilitated Yeltsin's campaign had descended from organizations that had earlier been developed to support his push for the RSFSR to establish a presidency.

The campaign organization consisted of two leading entities, the official campaign committee and the Democratic Russia-run national initiative group. While Yelstin officially ran as an independent candidate, the latter organization nonetheless played a critical role in his campaign operations.

=== Structure ===
Campaign structure

National initiative group (Democratic Russia); Chairperson: Aleksandr Muzykansky | Official campaign committee Chairperson: Gennady Burbulis
Strategy group | Logistics group | Central office
Regional public committees | Regional representatives
District level committees
Neighborhood and factory organizations

The campaign consisted of two components, a national initiative group and an official campaign committee.

In the national initiative groups's chain of command was that neighborhood and factory organizations answered to district level committees, which answered to regional public committees, which answered to the committee's logistics group. A strategy group acted independent of the logistic group's authority.

In the chain of command of the official campaign committee, regional representatives answered to the central office.

Regional representatives of the official campaign coordinated with regional public committees of the national initiative group.

=== Official campaign committee ===
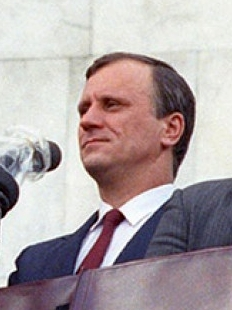
Gennady Burbulis served as the chairman of the official campaign committee

The chairperson of the official campaign committee was Gennady Burbulis. He directly oversaw a staff of one hundred "trusted persons".

==== Central office ====
The campaign's central office was staffed by thirty paid staff as well as approximately 200 technical specialists and volunteers.

==== Regional representatives ====
Representatives of the campaign were located in each of Russia's federal subjects. They acted as the official conduit between the official campaign and regional public committees.

=== National initiative group (Democratic Russia) ===
The campaign's national initiative group, run by Democratic Russia, was chaired by Aleksandr Muzykansky, who, at the time, was the Vice Chairperson of the Moscow City Soviet. Muzykansky had previously been the lead organizer of Yeltsin's campaign in the 1989 legislative election.

The national initiative group was a continuation of an existing Democratic Russia apparatus which had been formed (in advance of the March 1991 referendum) to support Yeltsin's push to establish a presidency.

On May 18 and 19, national, regional, and district level organizers from Democratic Russia met in Moscow with a team of five campaign experts, led by Paul Weyerich and Robert Krieble from the United States-based Committee for a Free Congress. The experts provided them with campaign advice.

==== Strategy group ====
Members of the strategy group consisted of Democratic Russia's five co-chairpersons and a number of advisors. Lev Ponomar was a member, as he was one of Democratic Russia's five co-chairpersons.

==== Logistics group ====
The logistics group had between five and eight paid staff members, whose efforts were supplemented by a number of volunteer staff members. The logistics group commanded field operations as the direct superior to the regional public committees.

===== Regional public committees =====
Regional public committees were located in each of Russia's federal subjects, overseeing the campaign's field operations in each subject. They were each run either by regional chapters of Democratic Russia, by affiliated political parties, or by both. The regional public committees were the key component of the campaign's operations, conducting a bulk of the work.

Neither the regional public committees nor their subordinate units (district level committees, neighborhood and factory organizations) conducted canvassing. The campaign had opted against canvassing because, in many regions, they lacked enough volunteers to conduct impactful canvassing efforts. They also decided against it because they believed that, in the regions where they would be able to find enough volunteers, too many volunteers would be extremist democrats. They feared that such volunteers would be harmful if they represented the campaign to voters. The campaign instead relied on using advertising mail to distribute campaign literature to voters, often by having volunteers anonymously drop leaflets into mailboxes.

==== District level committees ====
District level committees were sub-regional committees tasked with overseeing campaign efforts in a number of districts. They were each run either by regional chapters of Democratic Russia, by affiliated political parties, or by both.

==== Neighborhood and factory organizations ====
Neighborhood and factory organizations were, respectively, local organizations dedicated to overseeing field operations and individual neighborhoods or efforts targeting the workforce in individual factories. They were run by local volunteers alongside either regional chapters of Democratic Russia, affiliated political parties, or by both.

== See also ==
- Boris Yeltsin 1996 presidential campaign
