= Gennady Burbulis =

Russian politician (1945–2022)

- Геннадий Бурбулис
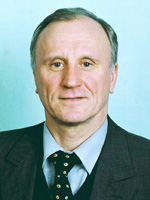
- Burbulis in 2004

Russian Federation Senator from the Novgorod Oblast
- In office 2 November 2001 – 16 November 2007
- Preceded by: Mikhail Prusak
- Succeeded by: Aleksandr Korovnikov

Member of the State Duma for Sverdlovsk Oblast
- In office 11 January 1994 – 18 January 2000
- Preceded by: Leonid Nekrasov
- Succeeded by: Zelimkhan Mutsoev
- Constituency: Pervouralsk (No. 166)

Secretary of State under the President of the Russian Federation
- In office 8 May 1992 – 26 November 1992
- President: Boris Yeltsin
- Preceded by: Position established (Himself; as Secretary of State of the Russian SFSR)
- Succeeded by: Position abolished

First Deputy Prime Minister of Russian SFSR/Russian Federation
- In office 6 November 1991 – 15 June 1992
- President: Boris Yeltsin
- Prime Minister: Boris Yeltsin (de facto)
- Preceded by: Oleg Lobov
- Succeeded by: Yegor Gaidar

Secretary of State of the Russian SFSR
- In office 19 July 1991 – 14 April 1992
- President: Boris Yeltsin
- Preceded by: Position established
- Succeeded by: Position abolished (Himself; as Secretary of State under the President of the Russian Federation)

Personal details
- Born: 4 August 1945 Pervouralsk, Sverdlovsk Oblast, Russian SFSR, USSR
- Died: 19 June 2022 (aged 76) Baku, Azerbaijan
- Resting place: Troyekurovskoye Cemetery, Moscow
- Party: CPSU (1971–1990)
- Education: Ural State University
- Gennady Burbulis's voice Burbulis on the Echo of Moscow program, 9 November 2006

Gennady Eduardovich Burbulis (Russian: Геннадий Эдуардович Бурбулис; 4 August 1945 – 19 June 2022) was a Russian politician. A close associate of Boris Yeltsin, he held several high positions in the first Russian government, including Secretary of State, and was one of the drafters and signers of the Belavezha Accords on behalf of Russia. He was one of the most influential Russian political figures in the late 1980s and early 1990s and one of the main architects of Russian political and economic reform.

== Early life and education ==
Burbulis was born in the Urals city of Pervouralsk on 4 August 1945, the grandson of Kazimir Antonovich Burbulis, a Lithuanian factory worker evacuated to the Urals during World War I. He described how his decision to keep a Lithuanian surname against the urging of his Russian mother cost him the position of the first and only Vice President of Russia in 1991, a position that went to Alexander Rutskoy; according to Burbulis Yeltsin told him that his surname was "questionable for the Russian electorate".

His father Eduard Kazimirovich was a military pilot, and his mother Valentina Vasilievna Belonogova was an ethnic Russian. In 1962, he graduated from high school and went to work as an instrumentation fitter at the Chrompikovy Plant, and then at the Pervouralsky Novotrubny Plant.

In 1964, he began active military service in the Strategic Rocket Forces in the Kirov Oblast.

He graduated from the philosophy department of Ural State University and later was awarded a Candidate of Science (Philosophy) degree. He taught in several institutions of higher education in and around Sverdlovsk (now Yekaterinburg).

== Career ==
In 1987, during the perestroika period, Burbulis organized the Sverdlovsk Podium, an open forum for discussing local and later national social, political, and economic problems. In 1989 he was elected to the Congress of People's Deputies of the Soviet Union. He was one of the initiators of the Inter-regional Deputies’ Group, the first legally organized opposition in the Soviet Union, which was later credited by some with being one of the prime catalysts for democratic reform.

In 1989, Burbulis became acquainted with Boris Yeltsin, who had been elected to the Congress of People’s Deputies with 90 percent of the vote. Burbulis nominated him to the post of Chairman of the Supreme Soviet (the Congress’s standing body), which he was elected to on 29 May 1990. Yeltsin appointed Burbulis his authorized representative and deputy chairman of his Higher Consultation and Coordination Council.

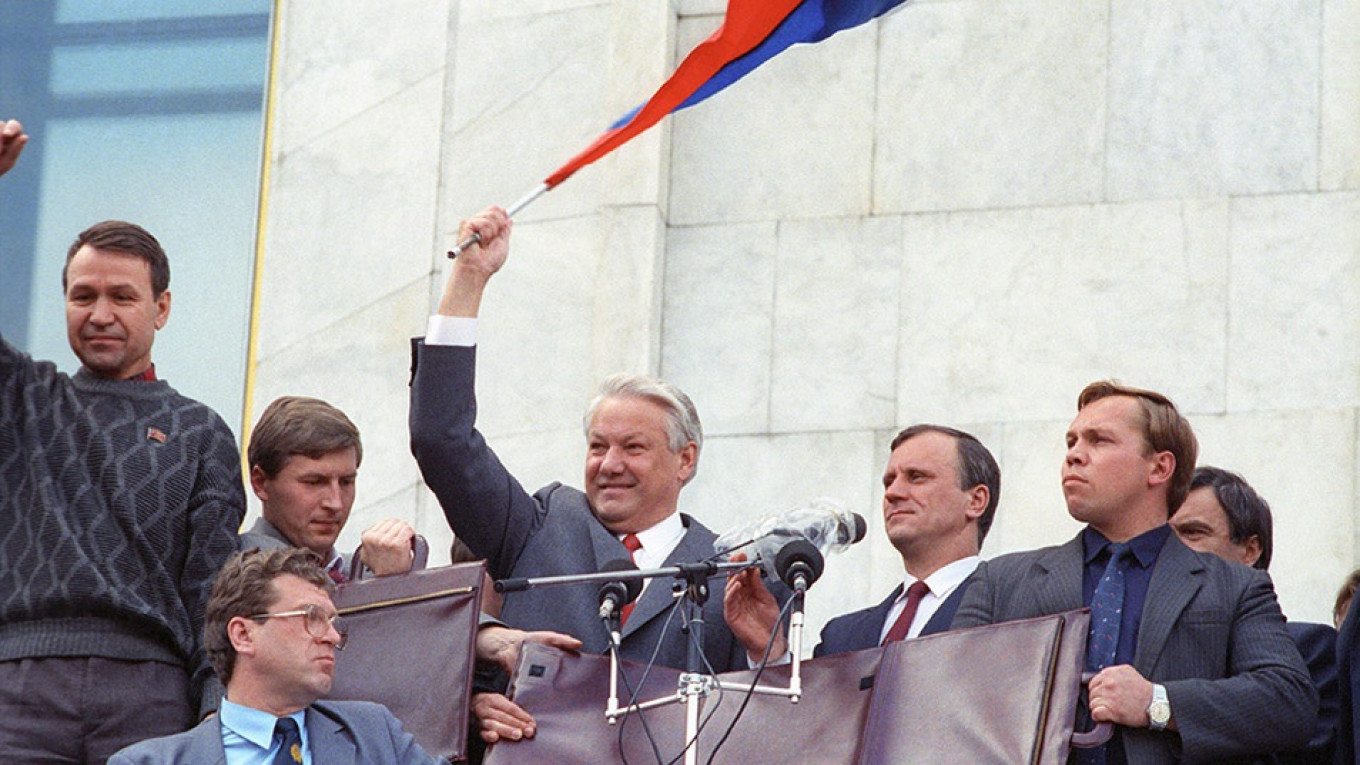
Yeltsin and Burbulis during the August Coup in 1991

On 12 June 1990, the Congress of People’s Deputies of the RSFSR passed a law on the sovereignty of Russia within the framework of the Soviet Union. Yeltsin declared his candidacy for the newly established post of president and Burbulis organized his election campaign. On 12 June 1991, Yeltsin won the presidency with 57 percent of the popular vote. On 19 July 1991, Yeltsin appointed Burbulis Secretary of State, a position he held until 8 May 1992, when the post was renamed State Secretary to the President of the Russian Federation (which Burbulis held until 26 November 1992). From 6 November 1991, until 14 April 1992, Burbulis was also First Deputy to the Chairman of the Government (Cabinet). Effectively the second leader in the Russian government after Yeltsin, Burbulis was responsible for developing the strategy and overseeing the implementation of political and economic reforms. He also made significant contributions to the shaping of foreign policy and domestic security issues.

Burbulis was one of the drafters and signers of the Belavezha Accords that effectively ended the Soviet Union and founded the Commonwealth of Independent States.

By the end of 1992, Burbulis had become a lightning rod for criticism directed against the government’s reform policies. He served briefly (26 November 1992 – 14 December 1992) as the head of a group of advisors to the president and then left the federal administration.

== Later work ==
In 1993, Burbulis founded the Strategy Center for Humanitarian and Political Science. He was elected to the State Duma (the lower house of the Russian parliament) twice and served as a deputy from 14 January 1994, to 18 January 2000. He served as deputy to the governor of Novgorod Oblast from 5 June 2000 to 14 November 2001, after which he represented Novgorod in the Federal Assembly (upper house of the Russian parliament) from 14 November 2001, to 5 September 2007. As Advisor to the Chairman of the Federation Council he was the initiator and first deputy to the Chairman of the Center for Legislation Monitoring and headed the group producing the annual Review of Legislation in the Russian Federation.

In August 2009, he founded the School of Politosophy and was president of the Youth Forum of Modernizers, “My Russia.” He was also the president of the Short Track Speed Skating organizational body of the Russian Federation.

== Death ==
Gennady Burbulis died on 19 June 2022 in Baku, Azerbaijan, where he took part in the Global Baku Forum at the age of 76. On the day of his death, Burbulis commented on Russia’s attempts to restore the Soviet Union, stating: "It is impossible to restore the USSR. This is nonsense and utopia."

== Personal life ==
He was married to Natalya Kirsanova, who studied with him at university, and taught philosophy at the Ural Forest Engineering Institute. They had a son, Anton, who lives in Moscow.

== Honours and awards ==
- Medal "In Commemoration of the 850th Anniversary of Moscow"
- Medal "In Commemoration of the 1000th Anniversary of Kazan"
- Medal "In Commemoration of the 300th Anniversary of Saint Petersburg"
- Jubilee Medal "Twenty Years of Victory in the Great Patriotic War 1941-1945"

== See also ==
- Popular Patriotic Party
