= Vadim Bakatin 1991 presidential campaign =

Presidential campaign in Russia

Vadim Bakatin presidential campaign, 1991
- Campaigned for: 1991 Russian presidential election
- Candidate: Vadim Bakatin; Chairman of the KGB (1991–1992); Soviet Minister of Internal Affairs (1988–1990); Ramazan Abdulatipov; Chairman of Soviet of Nationalities (1990-1993)
- Affiliation: Independent

The 1991 presidential campaign of Vadim Bakatin was the candidacy of KGB Chairman Vadim Bakatin in the 1991 Russian presidential election.

Bakatin's running mate was Ramazan Abdulatipov.

Bakatin ultimately placed last in the election out of six candidates, receiving 2,719,757 votes (3.5% of the votes cast).

== Background ==
Bakatin had previously been put forth as a candidate for the Communist Party of the Soviet Union's nomination for the 1990 Soviet Union presidential election. However, he decided not to compete.

It had been rumored in late-April 1991 that Bakatin was going to be selected as the Communist Party of the Soviet Union's nominee in the Russian presidential election. In early may, some figures in Russian politics believed that, if he ran, Murashev was poised to be Yeltsin's strongest opponent.

In mid-May Bakatin, reportedly, had agreed to be Boris Yeltsin's running mate. However, he was ultimately persuaded by Mikhail Gorbachev to challenge Yeltsin for the presidency instead.

== Campaigning ==
Launching his campaign in mid-May, Bakatin selected chairman of the Council of Nationalities of the RSFSR Supreme Soviet Ramazan Abdulatipov (one of presidential frontrunner Boris Yeltsin's primary political rivals) to be his running mate. He hoped that Abdulatipov would help him to appeal to voters in the Autonomous Republics of Russia, who cumulatively made-up 14% of the Russian electorate.

Despite the fact that the Communist Party of the Russian Soviet Federative Socialist Republic had officially had backed Nikolai Ryzhkov, upon Bakatin's entry into the race some members of the party commented that they believed that Bakatin would be a superior candidate to face Yeltsin in a second-round of the election. Since the party's primary goal was to beat Yeltsin, they provided support to both Bakatin and Ryzhkov's campaigns. In an effort to set himself apart, Bakatin derided Ryzhkov as a backwards-looking "man of yesterday".

Bakatin campaigned vigorously. However, he was hampered by limited resources, which his campaign had dispersed too thinly for them to make enough of an impact. Nevertheless, in advance of the election, (along with Ryzhkov) he was seen as a likely individual to place second. Many polls predicted that he would place third.

=== Outcome ===
Bakatin's last-place finish was seen as a surprise. Particularly surprising was that he had been significantly outperformed by the campaign of nationalist politician Vladimir Zhirinovsky (who had a surprise third-place finish).

== Platform ==
As a candidate, Bakatin sought to present himself as a liberal-leaning centrist. His policies were characterized as moderately progressive and incorporated many aspects of Gorbachev's politics. Bakatin was essentially regarded to be a moderate communist. His positions foremost appealed to reform-Communists.

Bakatin dubbed himself to be the "only independent" candidate in the election. At the close of the campaign, he asserted that his positions were more closely similar to those of Yeltsin's than they were to those of Ryzhkov. He argued that, of the candidates, only he and Yeltsin represented democracy. He criticized Ryzhkov as a backwards-looking "man of yesterday".

Bakatin asserted that it was imperative that whoever won the election would need to pass anti-corruption legislation as well as a legal act on state service. He criticized the Russian government for being inactive and allowing corruption to spread throughout itself.

Bakatin said that he personally favored private ownership of land, but condemned Yeltsin's efforts to force privatization through, arguing that the general population was not yet ready for such reforms. Bakatin stated that, "the right to private property should be acknowledged as sacred" and that after that, "everything will fall into place." He believed that the Communist Party of the Soviet Union suffered from the fact that it was unable to, "coherently say words like 'private property.'"

He derided Gorbachev's foreign economic policy as a, "humiliating search for whoever will give us loans."
