= First inauguration of Boris Yeltsin =

1991 inauguration

1991 presidential inauguration of Boris Yeltsin
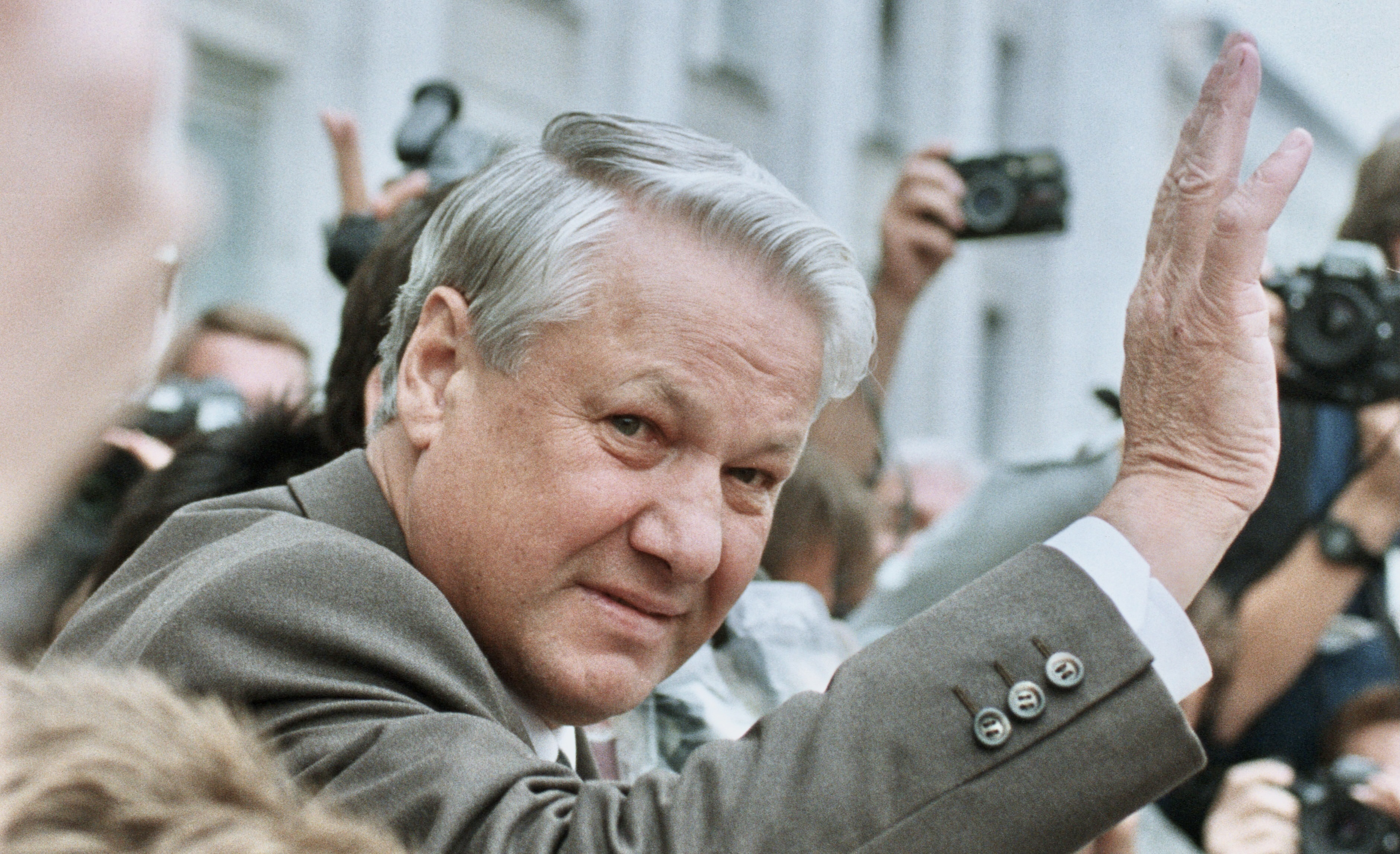
- Boris Yeltsin in 1991
- Date: 10 July 1991; 34 years ago
- Location: State Kremlin Palace Moscow
- Participants: President of Russia, Boris Yeltsin Assuming office Chairman of the Presidium of the Supreme Soviet of Russia, Ruslan Khasbulatov Administering oath

The first inauguration of Boris Yeltsin as president of the Russian Soviet Federative Socialist Republic (RSFSR) took place on Wednesday, 10 July 1991. The ceremony was held at the State Kremlin Palace and it lasted about thirty minutes. It was the first presidential inauguration ceremony in the history of Russia.

== Background ==
As a result of a nationwide referendum on the introduction of the office of president of the RSFSR, the first presidential election was held on 12 June 1991. Boris Yeltsin won the elections, gaining more than 58 percent of the vote.

== Inaugural events ==
This flag was displayed by Yeltsin's right at the inauguration ceremony. This was the only time it was displayed in this manner and has not been publicly seen since.

Yeltsin took an oath in front of a podium displaying the Constitution of the RSFSR and that of the Soviet Union, as well as the Declaration of State Sovereignty of Russia. After taking the oath, the Russian anthem was performed. Speeches were given by Patriarch of Moscow and All Russia Alexy II, President Yeltsin, and President of the Soviet Union Mikhail Gorbachev.

In contrast to the American tradition, Vice President Alexander Rutskoy, who was elected alongside Yeltsin, did not bring an oath, but was present at the ceremony as a guest.

=== Oath ===
The following oath was read by Yeltsin (his right hand over his chest) at his inauguration:

I swear in exercising the powers of President of the Russian Soviet Federative Socialist Republic to observe the Constitution and laws of the RSFSR, to protect its sovereignty, respect and protect the rights and freedoms of man and citizen, the right of peoples of the RSFSR and conscientiously fulfill the duties entrusted to me by the people.
