= Popular Patriotic Party =

Political party in Russia

The Popular-Patriotic Party of Russia (Russian: Народно-патриотическая партия, abbr. NPP) was a political party in Russia. It was founded in spring 1992, reportedly under guidance of Gennady Burbulis with the aim on consolidating support for the Boris Yeltsin regime among military people (former soldiers and veterans).

The party was officially founded in July 1992, Alexander Kotenev and Anatoly Gil became co-chairmen (both were leaders of an Afghan veteran's organization). In 1992/93, the party was joined by 4 people's deputies. The party also joined a number of pro-reform coalitions, like 'Supporters of Reform' and the bloc Democratic Choice of Russia. After Burbulis was sacked from his positions in the government, the party drifted for a time between democratic (pro-reform), moderately nationalist and socialist positions, before fixing its allegiance to president Yeltsin and the executive branch.

In September 1993 the party's leaders supported president Yeltsin's decree Nr. 1400 dissolving the Russian Supreme Soviet. It is reported that NPP battalions formed of (private) security service employees took part in blocking the Supreme Soviet building. The party sought to participate of the 1993 Russian legislative election but failed to gather enough signatures to be enabled to present its list. In 1994, Kotenev left the party. The NPP took part in the 1995 Russian legislative election within the list 'For Motherland'. The bloc failed to pass the 5% barrier, winning only 0.28% of votes. The party also contested the 1999 Russian legislative election, this time within the list Unity.

The party should not be mistaken for a nationalist organization of the similar name (Народно-патриотическая партия), existing from 2002 to 2007.
