= Poltoranin =

Poltoranin (Russian: Полторанин) is a Russian masculine surname, its feminine counterpart is Poltoranina. It may refer to

- Alexey Poltoranin (born 1987), Kazakh cross-country skier
- Olga Poltoranina (born 1987), Kazakhstani biathlete, wife of Alexey
- Mikhail Poltoranin (born 1939), Russian journalist and politician
