= Acting President of Russia =

Acting head of state post in Russia's constitution

Acting President of the Russian Federation
- Исполняющий обязанности Президента Российской Федерации
- Coat of arms of Russia

- Flag of Russia
- Executive branch in Russian Politics
- Status: Acting head of state Head of government (ex officio according to the Constitution)
- Member of: Government; State Council; Security Council
- Term length: Situational
- Constituting instrument: Constitution of Russia

The acting president of the Russian Federation (Russian: Исполняющий обязанности Президента Российской Федерации) is a temporary post provided by the Constitution of Russia. The acting president is a person who fulfils the duties of the president of the Russian Federation when cases of incapacity and vacancy occur. However, the person who takes office is more limited in power as the acting president can not dissolve the State Duma, call a referendum, or propose constitutional amendments. This post is held by the prime minister of Russia.

== History ==
=== 1993 ===
During the 1993 Russian constitutional crisis, Vice President Alexander Rutskoy was named by parliament as the acting president when the legislature announced Yeltsin's removal from office. On 21 September 1993 at 12:22 (MSK), Rutskoy assumed the powers of the acting president of Russia.

Rutskoy's interim presidency, although constitutional, was never acknowledged outside of Russia. After the two-week standoff and the violence on the streets of Moscow, on 4 October 1993 the parliament building was taken by Yeltsin's military forces. Rutskoy and his supporters were arrested and charged with organization of mass disturbances. On the same day, Yeltsin officially dismissed Rutskoy as vice president and fired him from the military forces. The vice presidency was abolished.

=== 1996 ===
Prime Minister Viktor Chernomyrdin assumed the role of acting president when President Boris Yeltsin underwent heart surgery in 1996. Chernomyrdin served for one day, from 5 to 6 November 1996. No major event occurred during that time.

=== 1999–2000 ===
After Yeltsin resigned on 31 December 1999, Prime Minister Vladimir Putin became the acting president until the election. A snap election was held in March 2000 and was won by Putin. He officially took office of President on 7 May 2000.

== Legislative gap ==
The Russian Constitution does not explicitly specify who should become acting president if the prime minister is not appointed or cannot perform his or her duties. This gap is to some extent filled by the Federal Constitutional Law "About the Government of the Russian Federation", article 8 of which states:

In the temporary absence of the Prime Minister of the Russian Federation, his duties shall be performed by one of the Deputy Prime Ministers of the Russian Federation in accordance with the written delineation of responsibilities.

Accordingly, if it is assumed that the performance of the duties of the president in urgent cases is one of the direct duties of the prime minister, and his deputies are authorized to perform all his duties in case of his absence, the duties of the president should be temporarily assigned to one of the deputy prime ministers in the order of substitution, established by order of the prime minister. However, the legality of the temporary performance of the duties of the president by the deputy prime ministers is groundless, both from practical and theoretical positions. So far, these gaps in the legislation have not yet manifested themselves.

On the other hand, some believe that if the prime minister cannot serve as acting president, the acting president should be the chairman of the Federation Council. However, nowhere in the legislation is this fixed.

== List ==
Independent Our Home – Russia Unity

Portrait	Name	Affiliation	Term of office		Qualifying office	Notes
	Alexander Rutskoy; Александр Руцкой; 16 September 1947 (age 79)	Independent	22 September 1993	4 October 1993	Vice President	De jure, Rutskoy was Acting President, during the 1993 constitutional crisis after Boris Yeltsin's removal from office by Supreme Soviet. At the same time, Yeltsin continued to serve as President.
	Viktor Chernomyrdin; Виктор Черномырдин; 9 April 1938 – 3 November 2010 (aged 72)	Our Home – Russia	5 November 1996	6 November 1996	Prime Minister	Acting President during President Yeltsin's heart surgery.
	Vladimir Putin; Владимир Путин; 7 October 1952 (age 74)	Unity	31 December 1999	7 May 2000	Prime Minister	Became acting president when President Yeltsin resigned. Was elected president and took office in 2000.
