= 1991 Russian presidential election =

- 12 June 1991
- Registered: 106,484,518
- Turnout: 74.67%
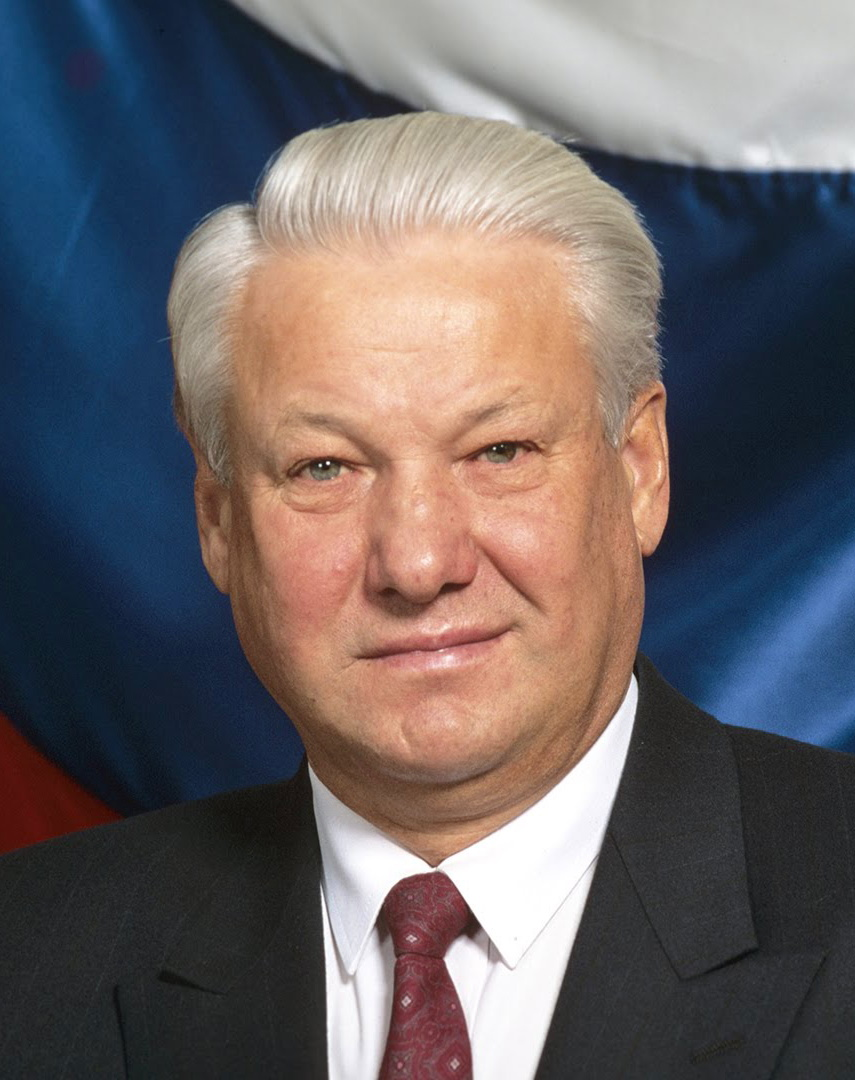

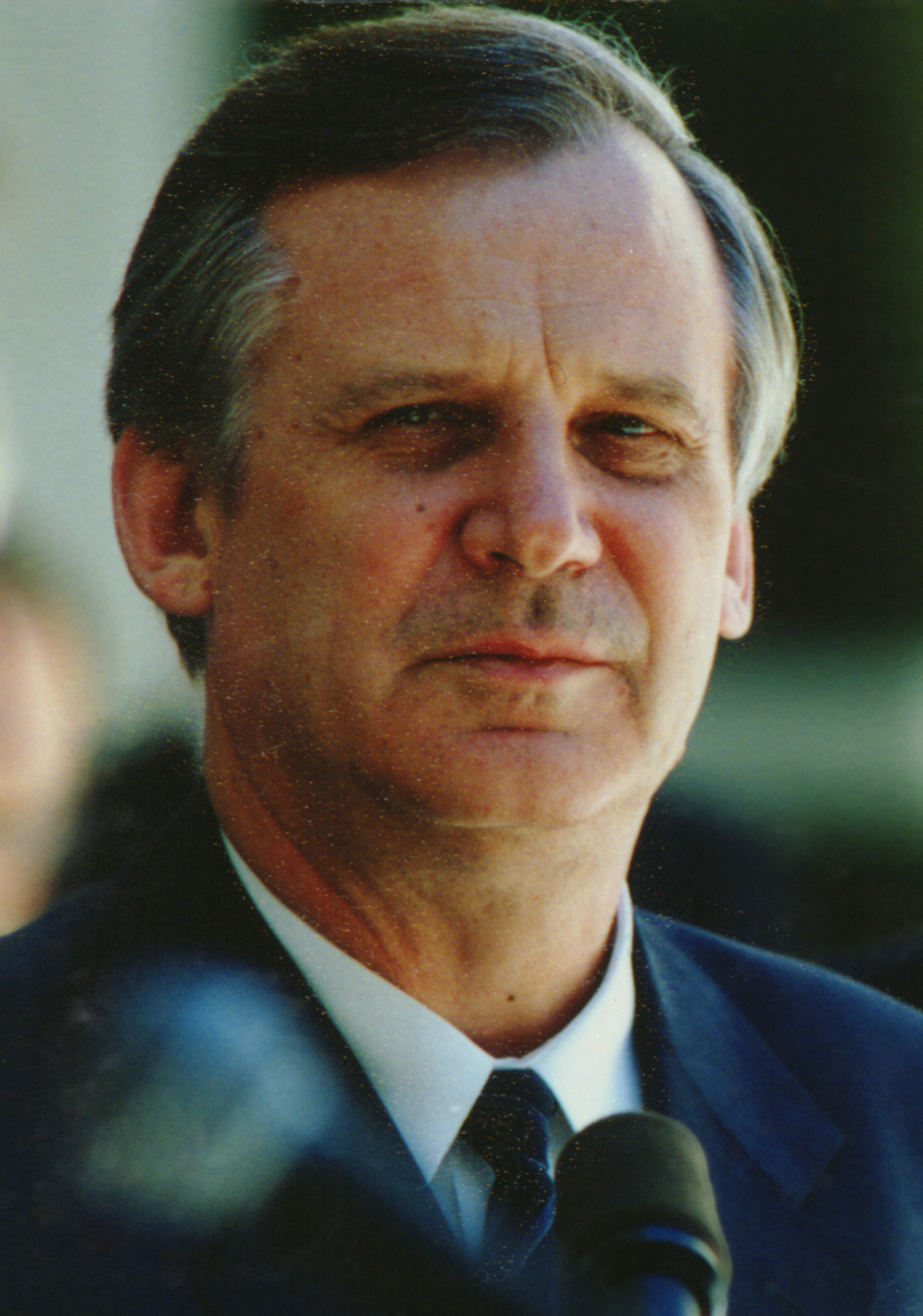

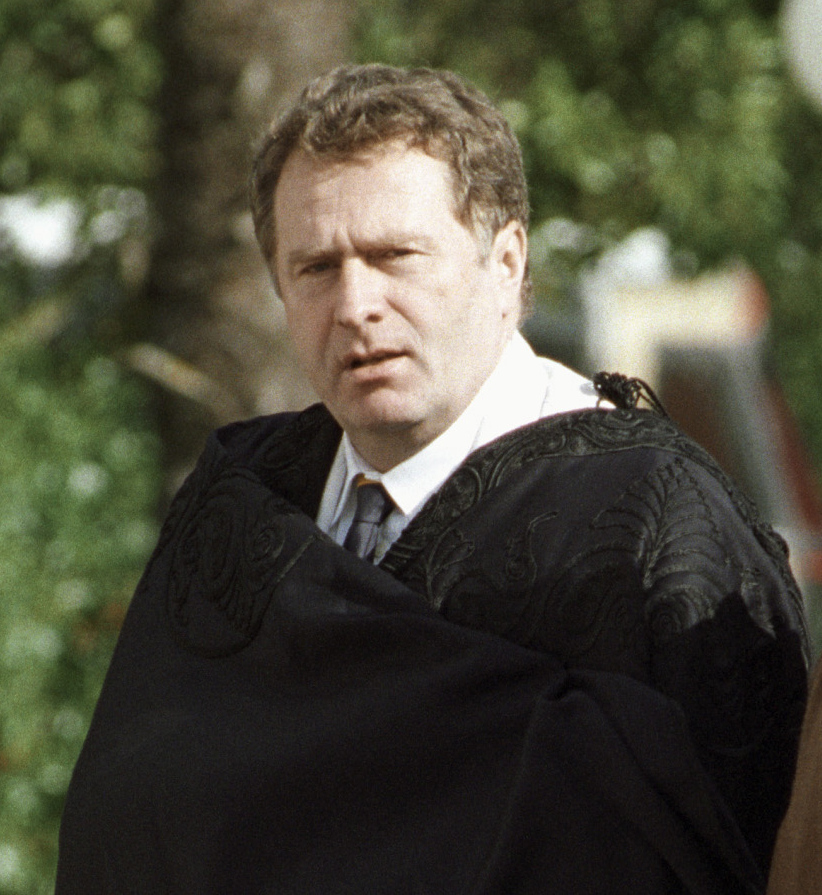

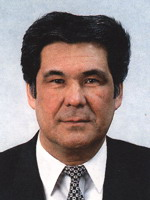
Nominee	Boris Yeltsin	Nikolai Ryzhkov
Party	Independent (Note: Although Yeltsin was an independent candidate and did not belong to any political party, his campaign was organized under the Democratic Russia movement.)	KP RSFSR
Running mate	Alexander Rutskoy	Boris Gromov
Popular vote	45,552,041	13,359,335
Percentage	58.56%	17.22%
Nominee	Vladimir Zhirinovsky	Aman Tuleyev
Party	LDPSS	Independent (Note: Member of the Communist Party of the Soviet Union, running an independent campaign.)
Running mate	Andrey Zavidiya	Viktor Bocharov
Popular vote	6,211,007	5,417,464
Percentage	7.98%	6.96%
- Most voted-for candidate by federal subject Yeltsin Ryzhkov Tuleyev
Elected President
Boris Yeltsin
Independent

Presidential elections were held in the Russian Soviet Federative Socialist Republic (RSFSR) on 12 June 1991. This was the first ever Russian presidential election. The election was held roughly three months after Russians voted in favor of establishing a presidency and holding direct elections in a referendum held in March that year. The result was a victory for Boris Yeltsin, who received 58.6% of the vote.

== Background ==
In the election of the Supreme Soviet of Russia's Congress of People's Deputies of Russia lower chamber members in the 1990 Russian legislative election, communist candidates won 86% of the seats. On 31 May 1990, Boris Yeltsin was elected Chair of the Supreme Soviet of the Russian Federation in a vote by the body's members; this made him the de facto leader of the Russian SFSR. The vote had been relatively close, as Soviet leader Mikhail Gorbachev had unsuccessfully tried to convince enough members of the Supreme Soviet to vote against Yeltsin. Yelstin made an active effort to push for the creation of an office of president and for a popular election to be held to fill it. Many saw this as a desire by Yeltsin to have a mandate and power separate from the tensely divided legislature. He ultimately succeeded in having Russia hold a referendum on 14 March 1991 on whether Russia should create offices of president and vice president, and hold elections to fill them. Russians voted in favor of creating and holding elections to these offices.

Following the referendum, there was a period of more than a week in which a stalemate had caused the Congress of People's Deputies to go without deciding whether or not to vote on whether the Russian Federation should have a directly elected president. On 4 April the Congress of People's Deputies ordered the creation of legislation to authorize the election. While still failing to set an official date for the election, the Congress of People's Deputies provisionally scheduled the election for 12 June. This provisional date would later become the official date of the election. Ultimately, the Congress of People's Deputies would approve for an election to be held, scheduling its initial round of voting to be held roughly three months after the referendum had been decided. The election would jointly elect individuals to serve five-year terms as president and vice-president of the RSFSR.

Several sub-national elections were scheduled to coincide with the first round of the presidential election. This included mayoral elections in Moscow and Leningrad, and executive elections in federal subjects such as Tatarstan. There were also sub-national referendums scheduled to coincide with the presidential election. These included a number of referendums in which cities were determining whether or not residents wanted to revert to their historic city names, such as in Sverdlovsk (historically Yekaterinburg) and Leningrad (historically Saint Petersburg).

=== Electoral system ===
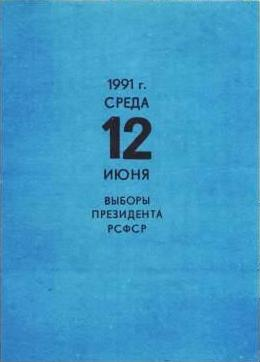
Voter invitation card for the election

In a difference to subsequent Russian presidential elections, a vice-presidential candidate stood for election along with the presidential candidate. Similarly to the United States presidential election system, the candidature of Vice President of the RSFSR was exhibited along with the candidacy of the President of the RSFSR as a joint entry on the ballot paper. Preliminary legislation outlining the rules of the election was passed on 24 April by the Supreme Soviet of Russia; however, it ultimately took the Supreme Soviet until three weeks before the day of the election to finalize the rules that would govern the election.

Any citizen of the RSFSR between the ages of 35 and 65 were eligible to be elected president. Any citizen of the RSFSR over the age of 18 was eligible to vote. 50% turnout was required in order to validate the election. The winner would need to have captured 50% of the votes cast. The president would be elected to a five-year term, and could serve a maximum of two terms. Originally, the election law stipulated that, once sworn in, the president would be required to renounce their membership of any political parties. On 23 May, the parliament voted to remove this requirement.

All candidates needed to be nominated before they could achieve ballot registration. Candidates could be nominated by RSFSR political parties, trade unions, and public organizations. There were two ways for candidates to achieve ballot registration. The first was by providing proof of having the support of 100,000 voters (a signature drive). The second way for candidates to obtain registration was if they received the support of 25% of the members of the Congress of People's Deputies, which would vote on whether or not to add such candidates to the ballot. On 6 May, it was announced that the deadline for nominations would be 18 May. This was also the deadline for nominating a vice-presidential running mate. Candidates were provided 200,000 rubles in public financing for their campaigns.

In May 1991, there were some calls to postpone the election, rescheduling it for September. Those urging the postponement of the elections argued that the time before the scheduled 12 June election day provided too brief of a period for nominating candidates and campaigning. In response to these calls, election commission chairman Vasilii Kazakov argued that the law stipulated that the election would be held on 12 June and that the proposed postponement of the election would only serve to "keep Russia seething" for another three months. In mid-May, election commission chairman Vasilii Kazakov announced that the election would be budgeted at 155 million rubles.

The results of the first round were to be counted and announced by a 22 June deadline. It had ultimately been determined that, if needed, a runoff would be scheduled to be held within two weeks after the first round.

=== Presidential authority ===
Due to the rushed circumstances behind the creation of the office and organization the election, many aspects of the office of President were not clear. Sufficient legislative debates were not held to outline the scope of presidential powers. It was unclear, for example, whether the president or the Congress of People's Deputies would hold ultimate legislative authority. One of the few stipulations that was made was that a two-thirds vote in the Congress of People's Deputies had the power, only if such a vote were recommended by the newly created constitutional court, to remove the president if they violated the constitution, laws, or oath of office. Work on drafting a law to outline the presidency itself began on 24 April, with approximately two months until the inaugural holder was set to occupy the office. Under the initial draft the president was the chief executive in the RSFSR, but did not have the right to dismiss the Supreme Soviet or the Congress of People's Deputies or suspend their activities. The president could not be a people's deputy and, once elected, would have needed to suspend their membership in all political parties.

On 25 May, the newly founded conservatives group in the Congress of People's Deputies blocked legislation championed by Yeltsin that would have explicitly allowed the president to remove local executives from office if the RSFSR Constitutional Court found them guilty of violating Russian Federation laws. The Supreme Soviet committee that had been tasked with redrafting the Russian Constitution deadlocked over the powers of the presidency. Attempts to reach a single resolution would continue after the election. By November, the committee would give up on reaching a single resolution, and opted to instead present two different drafts, one created by Yeltsin allies and one created by Yeltsin opponents. Neither of these would be approved. The failure to resolve these matters would ultimately contribute to the later eruption of the 1993 Russian constitutional crisis.

== Candidates ==
Presidential candidate	Vice presidential candidate	Party	Campaign
Vadim Bakatin	Ramazan Abdulatipov	Independent	(campaign)
Boris Yeltsin	Alexander Rutskoy	Independent	(campaign)
Vladimir Zhirinovsky	Andrey Zavidiya	Liberal Democratic Party	(campaign)
Albert Makashov	Alexey Sergeyev	Independent	(campaign)
Nikolai Ryzhkov	Boris Gromov	Communist Party of the RSFSR	(campaign)
Aman Tuleyev	Viktor Bocharov	Independent	(campaign)

== Campaigning ==
Although Yeltsin ran as an independent, he was supported by Democratic Russia. Despite the fact that four candidates were members of the Communist Party of the Soviet Union, Nikolai Ryzhkov was the only one who was officially nominated by the party. The other communists participating in the election ran as self-nominated candidates.

Yeltsin was the vast favorite to win the election. Rather than coalescing around a single candidate to challenge Yeltsin, the forces of the Soviet Communist establishment instead fielded a number of candidates, with Ryzhkov being their official candidate. Since no candidate was believed to have a chance of outright defeating Yeltsin in the first round of the election, Communists hoped that a wider field of candidates would increase the odds that they could siphon enough support away from Yeltsin that they could force the election into a runoff (which would occur if no candidate captured more than 50% of the votes cast). Communists believed that the political climate in Russia might be different by the fall, and perhaps less favorable to Yeltsin. Thus, they wagered that, by the time that a runoff vote might be held, Yeltsin might be in a weaker position as a candidate. Ultimately, Yeltsin succeeded in capturing a majority of the votes cast in the first round, negating the need for a runoff to be held.

Having an immensely comfortable lead, Yeltsin ran a relatively low-intensity campaign. Rather than heightening rhetoric and rallying voters, Yeltsin took a far more relaxed approach, taking very few shots at his challengers and offering very little specifics in regards to policy. In contrast, his opponents, trailing Yeltsin's gargantuan lead and having very little time left to decrease their deficit, took many shots at him and at each other.

== Conduct ==
The election had around 98,000 polling locations, and ballot papers were hand-counted.

While widely celebrated both in Russia and abroad as a breakthrough in Soviet/Russian democratization, the election was not entirely free and fair. Nevertheless, many commentators have regarded the 1991 elections to have been more free and fair than all subsequent Russian presidential elections.

=== Campaign law violations ===
Several candidates' campaign apparatuses continued to campaign after the time limit on election day, after which they were supposed to cease campaign activities. Zhirinovsky unsuccessfully attempted to contest the results of the election, accusing Yeltsin of using the resources of his office to assist his own campaign effort. He alleged that such resources went above what candidates could afford using the permitted public financing, and thus should be considered a campaign finance violation serious enough to nullify Yeltsin's victory.

=== Interventions by Mikhail Gorbachev's government ===
Despite officially remaining neutral and endorsing no candidate, Soviet leader Mikhail Gorbachev sought to prevent a victory by frontrunner Boris Yeltsin. Gorbachev attempted to convince more candidates to run. He did this in a hope that a greater number of candidates would increase the likelihood that other candidates would be able to siphon enough support away from Yeltsin that his vote share would be under 50%, thus ensuring that a runoff vote to be held.

Despite the fact that the military was supposed to have been depoliticized, its decisions were still orchestrated by the CPSU, and the military was utilized in the CPSU's attempt to stop Yeltsin from winning the election. On 30 April, Colonel General Nikolai Shlyaga, chief of the Main Political Administration, told representatives of that body that the army should be working to influence the outcome of the RSFSR presidential election. Shlyaga called for the establishment of election committees and urged that servicemen be briefed on the relative merits of the presidential candidates. This was perceived to be an army-sponsored campaign against Boris Yeltsin. In early June, the Defense Ministry issued a directive to commanders in the city of Arkhangelsk forbidding "spy-democrats" from campaigning for the RSFSR presidency among military units. This blocked pro-Yeltsin forces from conducting campaign activities directly targeting military votes. Meanwhile, such campaigning in support of Ryzhkov continued to be allowed.

On the eve of the election, in what was seen as a politically motivated move, the chief Soviet prosecutor announced that he was looking into currency violations by Yeltsin. The 11 June edition of Sovetskaya Rossiya featured a front-page article written by Nikolai Trubin, the Procurator General of the Soviet Union, which denounced Yeltsin for illegal offers to sell millions of rubles for dollars at several times the official rate. This was a deal that was never implemented but for which then-RSFSR Deputy Prime Minister Gennadii Fil'shin had resigned the previous February.

Actions to sway the election against Yeltsin were not perpetrated solely by officials in Soviet Union government. Conservative members of the RSFSR government also took similar actions. On the eve of the election, RSFSR Foreign Minister Andrei Kozyrev (a conservative government figure) came forward to claim that allegations that Yeltsin had appointed an alleged Italian mafioso as RSFSR honorary consul were true.

=== Media bias ===
There was a significant media bias in favor of Ryzhkov. CPSU media outlets, particularly towards the end of the campaign, attacked Yeltsin, accusing him of authoritarianism and incompetence. Many newspapers also had a strong bias favoring Ryzhkov; two days before the election, Pravda published a strong attack on Yeltsin, calling him "disloyal, authoritarian and incompetent." Pro-Yeltsin publications, and occasionally anti-Yeltsin publications, were critical in their coverage of Zhirinovsky. They belittled his candidacy and characterized him variably as "possessed" as well as a "Brownshirt" (Nazi), fascist, chauvinist, and Stalinist.

The coverage varied between Russia's two major television channels. The RSFSR-run RTR gave positive coverage to Yeltsin, while the central Soviet government-run ORT criticized him and provided broad coverage to the views of his opponents. ORT cast biased coverage of proceedings in the Russian legislature, broadcast a lengthy documentary on Ryzhkov shortly before the election, and also broadcast many anti-Yeltsin programs. It also largely disregarded the candidacy of Zhirinovsky in its coverage, allotting him just 2.5 hours of coverage to him against the 24 hours of coverage given to Yeltsin.

On 27 April, Leonid Kravchenko, Chairman of the Soviet State Committee on Television and Radio Broadcasting and the All-Union State Broadcasting Company, banned a scheduled broadcast by RSFSR TV (operator of RTR), a media entity of the RSFSR government which had been irregularly broadcasting since the previous year. It was soon reported that Kravchenk might possibly try to violate his agreement with the Russian government and block regular broadcasts by RTR during the campaigning period, depriving Yeltsin's government of their own state media outlet to utilize as a campaign tool; however, the station was allowed to launch its regular broadcasts on 13 May. Nevertheless, in many places local Communist authorities interfered with the signals of pro-Yeltsin broadcasts by the network. There was no signal interference experienced by ORT's anti-Yeltsin broadcasts.

RTR and a few print sources were the only outlets that provided Yeltsin with positive coverage.

=== Procedural irregularities ===
A number of procedural irregularities were reported by the Russian press. Some ballots were distributed which had mistakenly been printed without a seal containing the signature of an electoral commission member on their reverse sides. Consequentially, votes cast with such errant ballots were deemed void. Additionally, one ballot printing location in the Moscow Oblast printed 25,000 ballots which had mixed up presidential and vice-presidential candidate pairings.

=== Sabotage ===
Several campaigns saw acts of sabotage during the campaign period. On May 16, an explosion occurred in the room being used to store the signatures being gathered for Yeltsin's candidacy at the Democratic Russia headquarters in Moscow. The Baltimore Sun called it "the first political bombing in the capital for more than a decade". Sovetskaya Rossiya placed blame on the Libertarian (Radical) Party of the Soviet Union for perpetrating the attack, however, they denied involvement. A stand at the building of Orenburg's socio-political information centre containing Ryzhkov campaign material was destroyed.

=== Voter boycotts ===
On 28 May, the Tatarstan Supreme Soviet declared that Tatarstan would not "officially take part" in the election. This came following two weeks of public protests against the election in Tatarstan. There was strong political opposition in Tatarstan to the election, as it was regarded as infringing upon Tatarstan's claim to sovereignty. As a consequence, turnout in Tatarstan was 36.6%. Meanwhile, the election for President of Tatarstan, which was held the same day, saw turnout surpassing 60%.

A boycott of the election in Bashkortostan was encouraged by the newly founded group A Movement for a Sovereign Bashkortistan. The group was jointly formed by the Bashkir People's Party and the Tatar Democratic Party of the Bashkir ASSR.

== Debates ==
Televised debates were held featuring some of candidates. Despite having originally agreed to participate in the debates, Yeltsin ultimately chose not to.

== Opinion polls ==
Opinion polls indicated a strong likelihood of a Yelstin victory. On the day of the election, an analysis by The Times indicated that even the opinion polls that were the most pessimistic of Yeltsin's support still showed him garnering between 36% and 52% of the vote. Less pessimistic polls showed him garnering an even greater share of the vote. Most opinion polls showed Yeltsin far ahead of other candidates. Many showed him receiving more than 60% of the vote.

On the eve of the election, many polls incorrectly indicated that Bakatin was going to place third. Polls failed to reflect Zhirinovsky's strong performance. Three weeks prior to the election polls showed him with only 0.5% support.

Date	Agency	Yeltsin	Ryzhkov	Zhirinovsky	Tuleyev	Makashov	Bakatin	Other	Undecided	Would not vote
14 April	Sociology and Psychology Center	41.4%	23.6%							
Early May	Russian Sociopolitical Institute	60%	23%							
15 May	Sociology and Psychology Center	48.0%	28.3%							
30 May	Sociology and Psychology Center	35.7%	31.4%	0.7%	1.1%	1.7%	7.9%	—N/a	12.1%	9.4%
Early June	Russian Sociopolitical Institute	44%	31%			2%	10%			

== Results ==
Yeltsin decisively won a majority of the vote in the first round of the election, thus forgoing the need for a second round. On 13 June, he was reported to have won the election by Soviet media. Vasilii Kazakov, Chairman of the Central Election Commission, confirmed Yeltsin's victory. Official results were certified on 19 June.

Yeltsin became the first popularly elected leader in the history of Russia. His inauguration was held 10 July.

Candidate	Running mate	Party	Votes	%
Boris Yeltsin	Alexander Rutskoy	Independent	45,552,041	58.56
Nikolai Ryzhkov	Boris Gromov	Communist Party of the RSFSR	13,395,335	17.22
Vladimir Zhirinovsky	Andrey Zavidiya	Liberal Democratic Party	6,211,007	7.98
Aman Tuleyev	Viktor Bocharov	Independent	5,417,464	6.96
Albert Makashov	Alexey Sergeyev	Independent	2,969,511	3.82
Vadim Bakatin	Ramazan Abdulatipov	Independent	2,719,757	3.50
Against all			1,525,410	1.96
Total			77,790,525	100.00
Valid votes			77,790,525	97.84
Invalid/blank votes			1,716,757	2.16
Total votes			79,507,282	100.00
Registered voters/turnout			106,484,518	74.67
Source: Nohlen & Stöver, University of Essex, FCI
