= Vice President of Russia =

Vice President of the Russian Federation
- Вице-президент Российской Федерации
- Emblem of the Russian Federation (1992–1993)

- Flag of Russia (1991–1993)

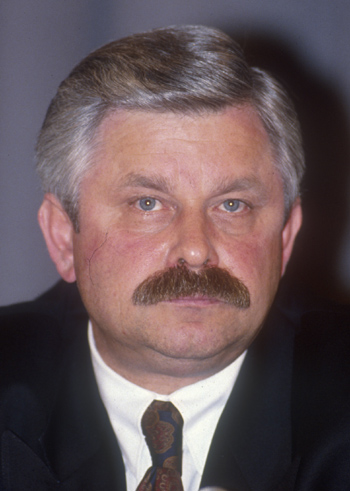
- Alexander Rutskoy
- Appointer: Directly elected with President of Russia
- Precursor: Vice President of the Soviet Union
- Formation: 10 July 1991
- First holder: Alexander Rutskoy
- Final holder: Alexander Rutskoy
- Abolished: 4 October 1993
- Superseded by: Prime Minister of Russia

The vice president of the Russian Federation (Russian: Вице-президент Российской Федерации, romanized: Vitse-prezident Rossiyskoy Federatsii) was a political office in Russia which existed from 1991 to 1993. The only occupant of this office was Alexander Rutskoy. The vice president was the first in the Russian presidential line of succession, becoming the new president of Russia upon the death, resignation, or removal of the president. Additionally, the vice president executed individual assignments on a commission of the president and acted for the president in his absence or in case when it would be impossible for the president to attend to his duties.

According to article 121-2 of the Russian Constitution of 1978, a citizen of Russia, no younger than 35 years old and no older than 65 years old, who is in possession of suffrage, may be elected vice president. The vice president was not allowed to be a people's deputy, or hold any other offices in state or public bodies as well as in businesses. The vice president was elected simultaneously with the president, and a vice presidential candidate was nominated by a candidate for president.

== History ==
Prior to 25 December 1991, the office was titled "vice president of the Russian Soviet Federative Socialist Republic" (Russian: Вице-президент РСФСР, romanized: Vitse-prezident RSFSR).

Following the 1993 Russian constitutional crisis the office was abolished, with its functions transferred to the prime minister of Russia. In the event of the president's incapacitation, death or resignation, the prime minister would now assume the presidential powers and duties as acting president. This was evidenced in the succession of then-prime minister Vladimir Putin as acting president after the resignation of Boris Yeltsin on 31 December 1999.

== List of vice presidents ==
Nonpartisan People's Party "Free Russia"
	Portrait	Vice President	Term of office	Term	President
1		Alexander Rutskoy; Александр Руцкой; Born 1947 (age 77)	10 July 1991 – 4 October 1993 (office abolished) (2 years, 86 days)	1 (1991)	Boris Yeltsin

== See also ==
- President of Russia
- 1993 Russian constitutional crisis
- Acting President of the Russian Federation
