= 1991 Russian presidential referendum =

National referendum on Russian President election method

- 17 March 1991
- Do you consider it necessary to introduce the post of President of the RSFSR elected by popular vote?

Results
Choice	Votes	%
Yes	53,385,275	71.38%
No	21,406,152	28.62%
Valid votes	74,791,427	97.86%
Invalid or blank votes	1,633,683	2.14%
Total votes	76,425,110	100.00%
Registered voters/turnout	101,776,550	75.09%
- Yes: 50–60% 60–70% 70–80% 80–90% No: 50–60% Vote not held

A referendum on creating the post of President of Russia was held in the Russian Soviet Federative Socialist Republic on 17 March 1991. The referendum was held alongside a referendum of the preservation of USSR. Prior to the referendum, the Russian head of state was the Chairman of the Supreme Soviet of the Russian SFSR, elected by the Congress of People's Deputies of the Russian SFSR. With 71% of voters approving the proposal, the post of President of the Russian SFSR was introduced, and two months later Boris Yeltsin was elected as the first president.

== Question ==
Do you consider it necessary to introduce the post of President of the RSFSR elected by popular vote?

== Results ==
Choice	Votes	%
For	53,385,275	71.38
Against	21,406,152	28.62
Total	74,791,427	100.00
Valid votes	74,791,427	97.86
Invalid/blank votes	1,633,683	2.14
Total votes	76,425,110	100.00
Registered voters/turnout	101,776,550	75.09
Source: Nohlen & Stöver

== Gallery ==
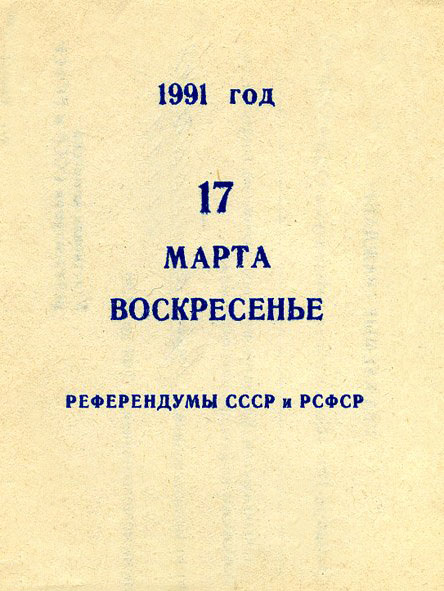
Voter invitation card for the referendum

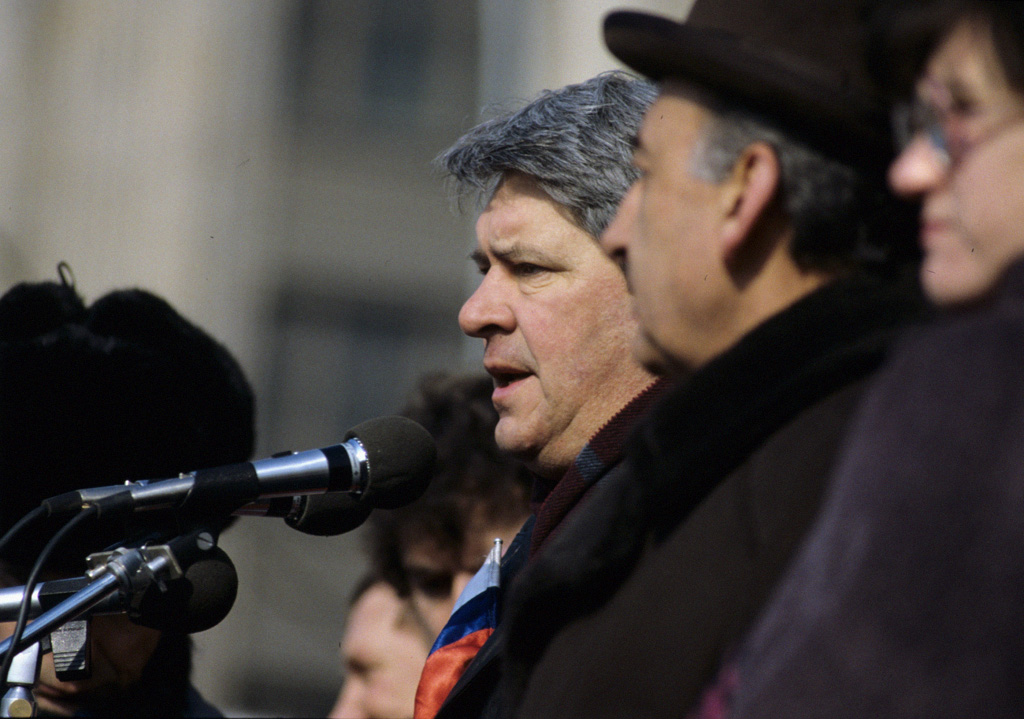
People's Deputy of the USSR Yury Afanasyev at a Moscow rally in support of Boris Yeltsin and the Russian presidential referendum

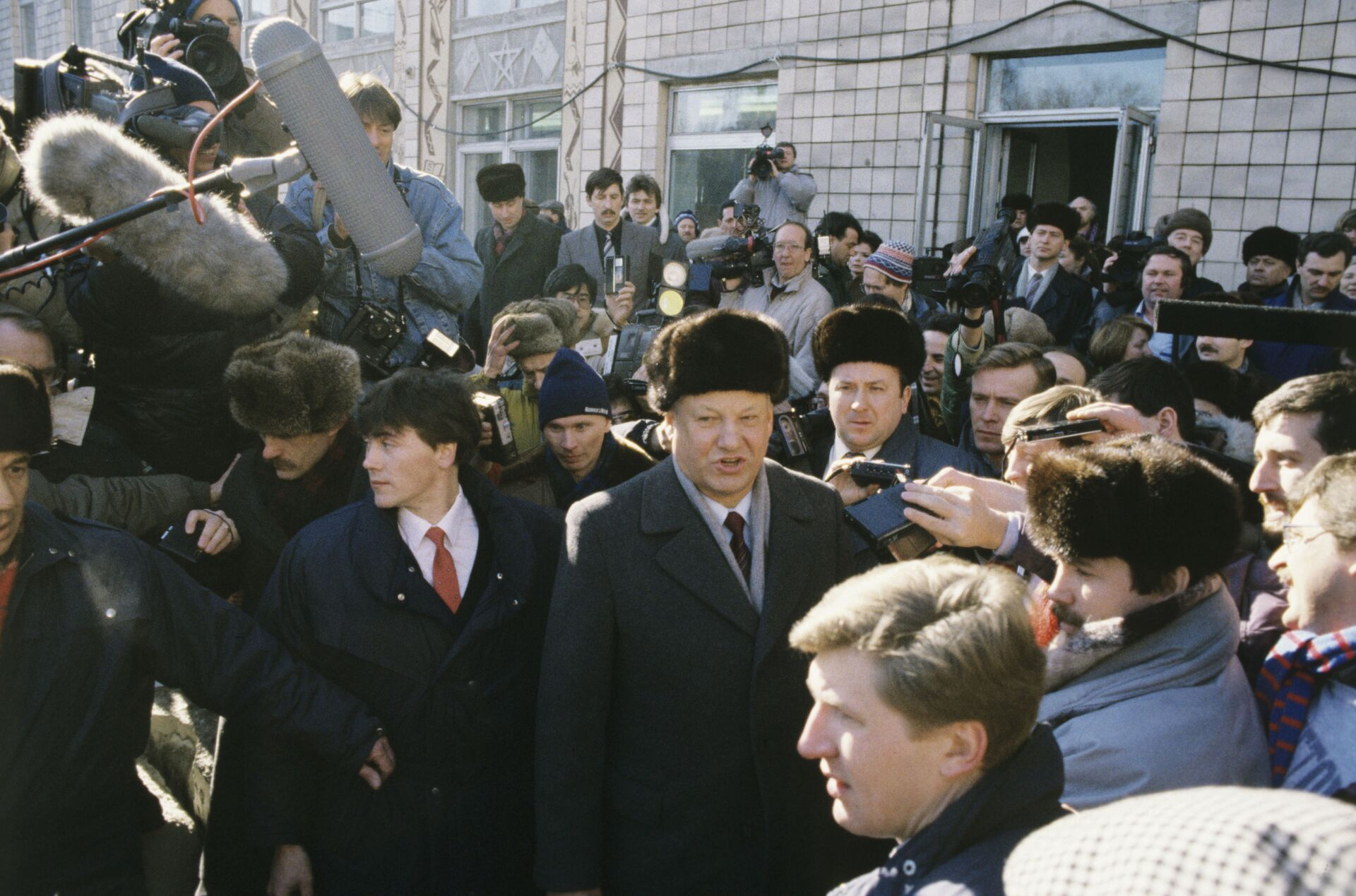
Boris Yeltsin campaigning in support of the referendum

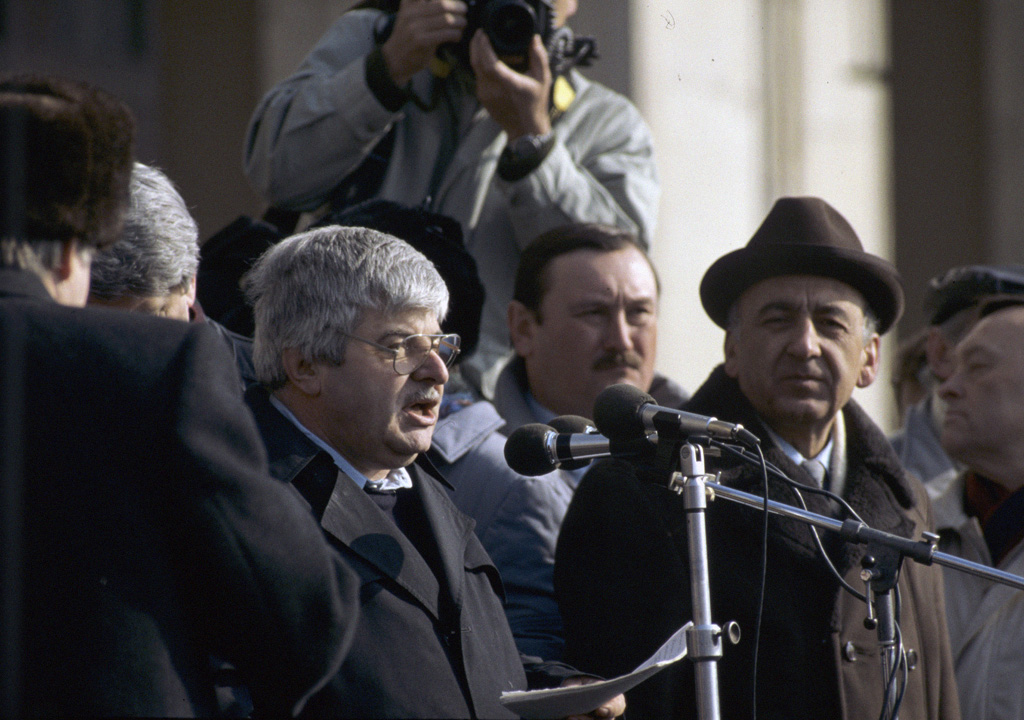
Moscow mayor Gavriil Popov at a rally in support of the referendum
