= Nikolai Ryzhkov 1991 presidential campaign =

Nikolai Ryzhkov presidential campaign, 1991
- Campaign: 1991 Russian presidential election
- Candidate: Nikolai Ryzhkov (for President); Boris Gromov (for Vice President)
- Affiliation: Communist Party
- Key people: Vladimir Savakov
- Slogan: To live peacefully

Nominees

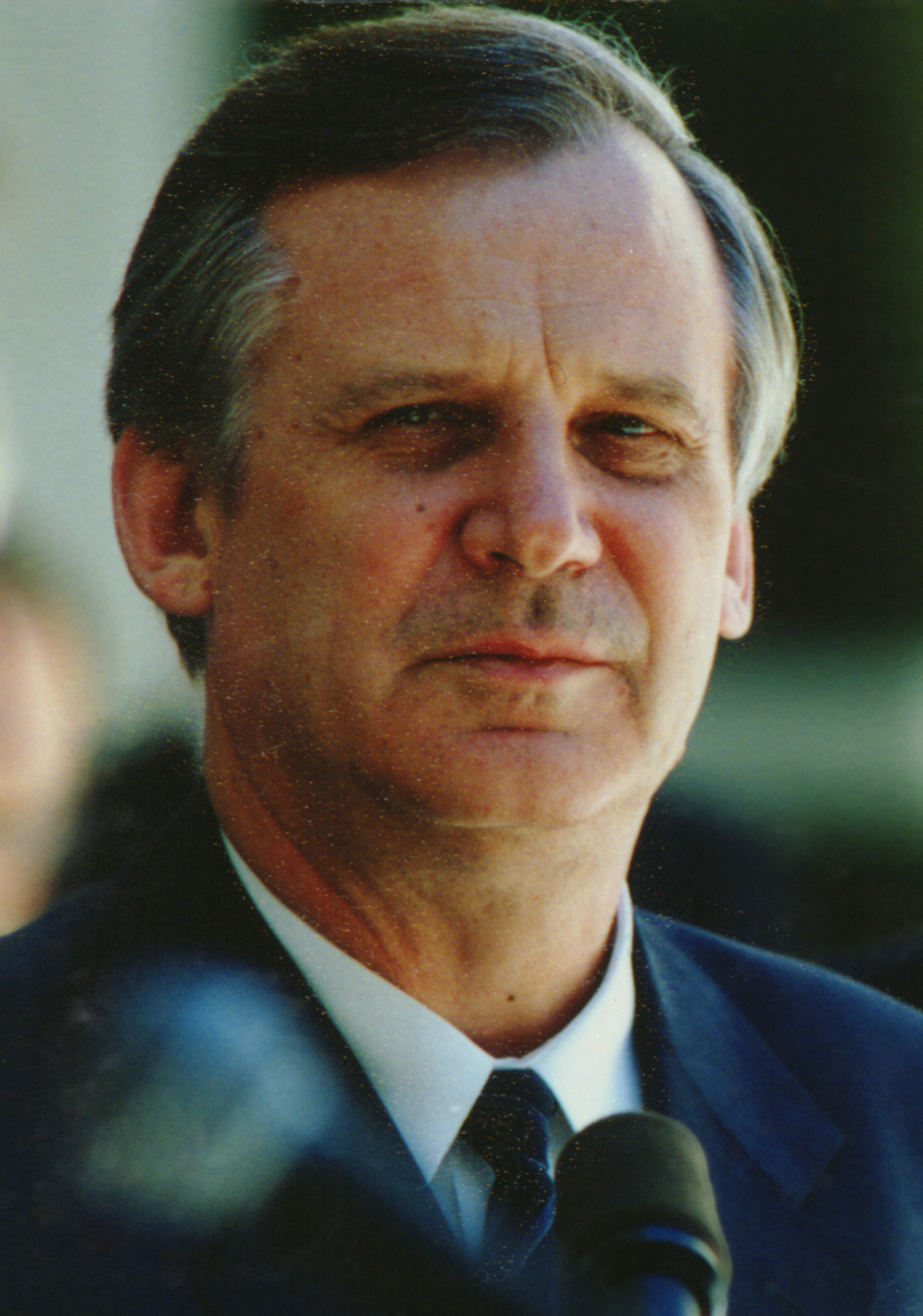
Nikolai Ryzhkov
(presidential nominee)

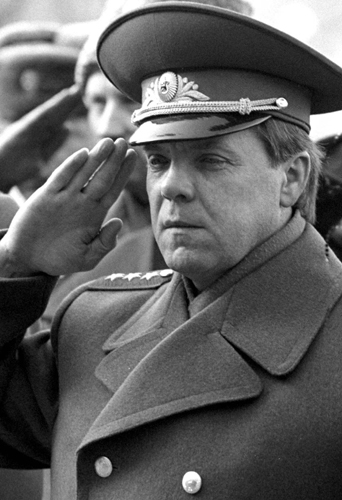
Boris Gromov
(vice presidential nominee)

The Nikolai Ryzhkov presidential campaign, 1991 was the election campaign of former Soviet Premier Nikolai Ryzhkov in the 1991 Russian presidential election. The nominee of the Communist Party, Ryzhkov was the strongest of several candidates running against frontrunner Boris Yeltsin in the election. Ryzhkov's running mate was Boris Gromov.

== Background ==
Despite their opposition to the creation of a presidency, the Communist Party of the RSFSR had declared on April 5 that it was interested in nominating a candidate in the presidential election. However, the Communist Party lacked any prospective candidate who was believed to be capable of defeating Yeltsin. Ivan Polozkov, the leader of the Communist Party of Russia, was very unpopular with the Russian public. Polozkov declined to run for the presidency, citing a need for him to focus on party affairs. There was uncertainty about who the Communist Party might nominate.

A well-known figure in Russian politics, polls indicated that Ryzhkov was well-liked by the Russian populace. On April 1, he declared that he intended to run for the presidency if nominated. Ryzhkov claimed that he had been urged to challenge Yeltsin by representatives of industrial and agricultural enterprises as well as public organizations.

Speculation on who the Communist Party would nominate had briefly centered on Vadim Bakatin before Ryzhkov's April 1 announcement. However, immediately after his April 1 announcement, Ryzhkov became the favorite for the nomination. Within a month, Ryzhkov would secure the support of the party's central leadership.

Ryzhkov had previously been put forth as a candidate for the Communist Party of the Soviet Union's nomination for the 1990 Soviet Union presidential election. However, he decided not to compete.

Ryzhkov had experienced a significant heart attack in December 1990, and had been subsequently sidelined from politics for a while. However, by spring of 1991 he was convinced that his health had been entirely restored.

During May Day celebrations in Moscow Ryzhkov made statements which invited a draft effort.

May 3 Ryzhkov declared in an interview with Izvestia that he would run for president. By this time an "initiative group" had already been set-up to facilitate his planned candidacy.

== Campaign ==
Ryzhkov's campaign officially began on May 6, when Ryzhkov held a press conference formally declaring his candidacy. Russia's aro-industrial industry organized, and on May 8 formally nominated him to be a candidate for president. On May 13 Ryzhkov was formally nominated by the Communist Party of the Russian Federation.

Immediately after he received the Communist Party's nomination, regional party committees immediately started to campaign for Ryzhkov using traditional methods of manipulation. He also won the immediate endorsements of figures such as Ivan Polozkov and Yegor Ligachyov (both of whose political views largely aligned with Ryzhkov's). However, not all of the party was unified behind its candidates. The ultra-conservative wing of the party, the Initiative Congress of Russian Communists, rejected Ryzhkov and instead gave its backing to Aleksei Sergeev.

Knowing that neither Ryzhkov or any other candidate had much chance of defeating Yeltsin outright, the Communist Party sought to lower Yeltsin's share of the vote to under 50% so that it would force a runoff.

By mid-May Rhyzkov had received nominations from more than 500 enterprises and organizations and had collected more than 600,000 signatures in support of his candidacy. He was projected by TASS to have the support of 25% of the electorate.

It was also in mid-May that Ryzhkov officially registered his candidacy and announced Gromov as his running mate. Ryzhkov hoped that Gromov would help him to attract the many conservative Russian voters who desired stability in society. Ryzhkov's campaign received support from organizations such as the Council of War and Labor Veterans (a political organization within the military) and the conservative RSFSR Writers' Union. In announcing Gromov as his running mate, Ryzhkov called him, "one of the most popular generals in our army" and "a mature political figure known for his lofty moral sense."

Despite the fact that his candidacy had the unofficial backing of Gorbachev's administration, he had hoped to win over voters who were becoming increasingly disenfranchised as a result of perestroika and Gorbachev's leadership, Ryzhkov tried to convince voters that he was not Gorbachev's candidate, declaring that Gorbachev's preferred candidate was instead Vadim Bakatin. For instance, he and Gromov boasted of Ryzhkov's resistance to a number of reforms enacted by Gorbachev.

Ryzhkov's candidacy saw strong support from peasants, the military, and pensioners. Most of Ryzhkov's support among voters came from the countryside. Ryzhkov saw strong support from the agricultural sector, as agricultural bureaucrats hoped that, as president, Ryzhkov would resist far-reaching privatization of land and the abolition of the kolkhoz system.

One of Ryzhkov's strengths as a candidate was that he was perceived as an experienced and competent manager. He had more extensive executive-level government experience than Yeltsin had. To amplify a contrast, Ryzhkov accused Yeltsin of being unfit for office, as well as a hazard to the nation's economic reforms. While his experience was one of his strengths, it also proved to be one of his weaknesses. During the short campaign period Ryzhkov found himself expending precious time defending his tenure as Soviet premier, expending nearly as much time on this as he did on outlining a vision for the future of Russia.

In an effort to impugn Yeltsin's image, Rhyzkov's campaign circulated many derisive rumors about him. He also aimed to paint Yeltsin as an anti-Union candidate.

While Ryzhkov had the official backing of the Communist Party of Russia, many in the party believed that Bakatin would be a superior candidate to face Yeltsin in a runoff. The party considered its primary objective to be Yeltsin's defeat in the election. Thus, upon Bakatin's entrance into the presidential race, the party began to provide support to his campaign in addition to Ryzhkov's. Nevertheless, Ryzhkov strongly benefited from being the party's organizational and propaganda apparatus.

Beginning in late-May, Politburo members Alexander Dzasokhov and Yegor Stroyev began campaigning on behalf of Ryzhkov.

In the final days of the election period, there was intense activity on the part of local and providential Communist Party organizations to mobilize the Russian electorate in support of Ryzhkov.

=== Outcome ===
Ultimately, Ryzhkov placed second in the election. He received a total of 13,395,335 votes, equal to 16.9% of the total vote. He placed more than forty points behind Boris Yeltsin, who won the election.

== Platform ==
Ryzhkov's campaign policies were characterized as conservative (anti-reform) communist. Ryzhkov had a conservative platform aimed at appealing to those who most opposed radical reform (namely government bureaucrats and those employed in the military-industrial complex).

Ryzhkov largely based his campaign platform off of the former government program (which had been rejected by Gorbachev for being too cautious on reform). During his time as Soviet premier, due to his insistence on taking a gradual approach to transitioning from a planned economy to a market economy, Ryzhkov had become a target of much ire from radical reformers (especially Yelstin and his allies). Ryzhkov criticized anti-crisis program of Valentin Pavlov, Ryzhkov's successor as Soviet Premier, for unjust price increases. Ryzhkov pledged to reverse those price increases.

Ryzhkov rejected capitalism and supported a socialist future for Russia. He opposed the privatization of property and promised that he would prevent the sale of Russian factories to millionaires and foreigners. He argued that, instead of being privatized, Russia's factories should be modernized with state funds.

Ryzhkov ran a pro-Union platform. However, he also sought to address concerns which voters had about the government of the Soviet Union, stating, "I am most resolute in my intention to uphold Russians' interests. The task is to resurrect Russia, to consolidate compatriots without destroying the Union—unlike some, I believe that the Union must not be destroyed."

He also indicated support for a stronger role of the central government of the Soviet Union. He criticized the transfer of Russian coal mines from USSR to RSFSR jurisdiction. He rebuked Yeltsin's targeted criticisms of the central government, saying, "I personally think that Boris Yeltsin's position is groundless. I think we should not simply give power to a person who has not made any substantial contribution to the development of Russia, or to the strengthening of the union for that matter."

Additionally, Ryzhkov pledged to combat over-bureaucratization, protect the rights of Russian expatriates, and to double the salaries of workers.
