= Alexander Rutskoy =

Russian politician (born 1947)

- Александр Руцкой
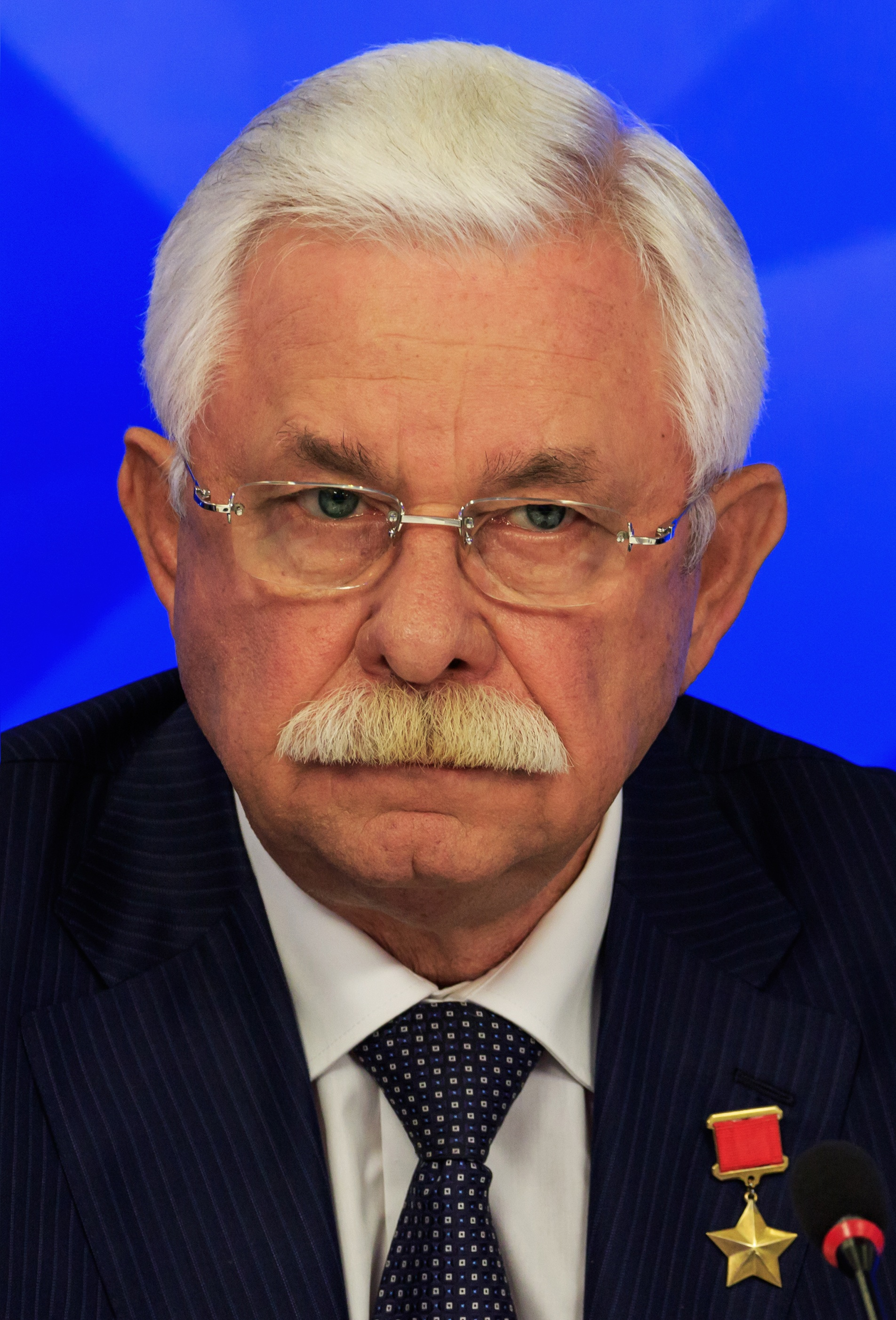
- Rutskoy in 2016

Acting President of Russia (disputed)
- In office 22 September 1993 – 4 October 1993
- Prime Minister: Viktor Chernomyrdin
- Preceded by: Boris Yeltsin
- Succeeded by: Boris Yeltsin

Vice President of Russia
- In office 10 July 1991 – 4 October 1993
- President: Boris Yeltsin; Himself (acting; disputed)
- Preceded by: Office established
- Succeeded by: Office abolished

Governor of Kursk Oblast
- In office 23 October 1996 – 18 November 2000
- President: Boris Yeltsin; Vladimir Putin
- Preceded by: Vasily Shuteyev
- Succeeded by: Alexander Mikhailov

Personal details
- Born: 16 September 1947 (age 79) Proskuriv, Ukrainian SSR, Soviet Union
- Citizenship: Soviet (1947–1991); Russian (1991–present)
- Party: Independent
- Other political affiliations: Patriots of Russia (2016); Derzhava (1995–1998); DPCR/NPSR (1991–1994); CP RSFSR (1990–1991); CPSU (1970–1991)
- Spouses: Nellie Zolotukhin (divorced) Lyudmila Novikova (divorced): Irina Popova
- Children: 4
- Awards: Hero of the Soviet Union (1988)
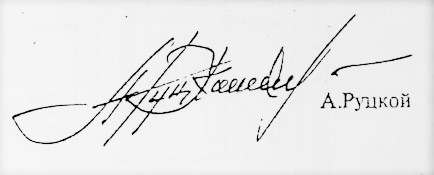
- Signature

Military service
- Allegiance: Soviet Union; Russia
- Branch/service: Soviet Air Force; Russian Air Force
- Years of service: 1971–1993
- Rank: Major general (Note: Rutskoy was expelled from the army after Yeltsin's victory in the 1993 Russian coup d'état.)
- Battles/wars: Soviet-Afghan War
- Rutskoy's voice Recorded September 2013

Alexander Vladimirovich Rutskoy (Note: In this name that follows East Slavic naming customs, the patronymic is Vladimirovich and the family name is Rutskoy.) (Russian: Александр Владимирович Руцкой; born 16 September 1947) is a Russian politician and former Soviet military officer who served as the only vice president of Russia (Note: The office of Vice President of Russia was abolished after the 1993 Russian constitutional crisis (in which Rutskoy played a major role as an antagonist to then-President Boris Yeltsin), and the newly-created post of Prime Minister of Russia became the second-highest ranking office in Russia. Thus, no other person but Rutskoy has ever served under the formal title of Vice President of the Russian Federation.) from 1991 to 1993. He was proclaimed acting president following Boris Yeltsin's impeachment during the 1993 Russian constitutional crisis, in which he played a key role.

Born in Proskuriv, Ukraine (modern Khmelnytskyi), Rutskoy served with great distinction as an air force officer during the Soviet–Afghan War, for which he was awarded the title Hero of the Soviet Union. In the 1991 Russian presidential election, he was chosen by Boris Yeltsin to be his vice-presidential running mate, but later became increasingly critical of Yeltsin's economic and foreign policies. In late September 1993, Yeltsin ordered the unconstitutional dissolution of the Russian parliament. In response, the parliament immediately annulled his decree, impeached him and proclaimed Rutskoy acting president. After a two-week standoff and popular unrest, Yeltsin ordered the military to storm the parliament building, arrested Rutskoy and formally dismissed him as vice president. He was imprisoned until early 1994, being released after the State Duma granted him amnesty.

In 1996, Rutskoy was elected governor of Kursk Oblast, a post he held until 2000. He was barred from seeking a second term by a regional court over alleged abuse of power.

== Early life and military career ==
Alexander Rutskoy was born on 16 September 1947 in Proskuriv, Ukrainian SSR, USSR (today Khmelnytskyi, Ukraine). Rutskoy graduated from High Air Force School in Barnaul (1971) and Gagarin Air Force Academy in Moscow (1980). From 1980 to 1984, he served in a fighter-bomber regiment based in the German Democratic Republic. By the end of his service in East Germany, he had become the regiment's chief of staff.

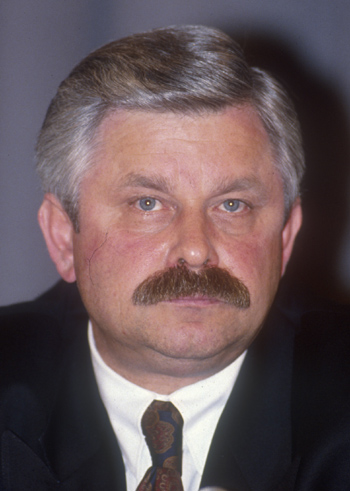
Alexander Rutskoy in 1992

In October 1985, Rutskoy was sent to Afghanistan to serve as the commander of the 378th Independent Attack Aviation Regiment, which flew Sukhoi Su-25s. At that time, he held the rank of lieutenant colonel. On 6 April 1986, during an attack mission in the Zhawar area, his aircraft was shot down by the Mujahideen. Rutskoy ejected successfully, but suffered serious back injuries and a broken arm. As a result, following hospital treatment, he was suspended from flying, although he retained his duties as the regiment's commander until December 1986. That same month, he was appointed deputy commander of the Centre for combat employment and retraining of flying personnel of the Frontal Aviation in Lipetsk. He was allowed to resume flying after passing a medical commission. Rutskoy returned to Afghanistan in April 1988 to serve as the deputy commander for aviation of the 40th Army, having been promoted to a colonel. However, he also continued flying Su-25s in combat. On 4 August, during an attack mission targeting a Mujahideen training camp six miles inside Pakistani territory, Rutskoy's aircraft was shot down by a PAF F-16A flown by Squadron Leader Athar Bukhari from No. 14 Squadron. Rutskoy ejected safely, but was captured by the local villagers before being handed over to the army and was briefly held as a POW in Islamabad. According to Steve Coll, the CIA intervened to secure his release to avoid interfering with the Geneva Accords and the Soviet withdrawal from Afghanistan. For his bravery and having flown 428 combat missions, he was awarded the title of Hero of the Soviet Union in 1988.

== Vice presidency ==
On 18 May 1991, he was selected as a vice presidential candidate together with presidential candidate Boris Yeltsin for the 1991 election. Rutskoy's candidacy was chosen by Yeltsin on the very last for candidates to submit their applications.

Rutskoy was Vice President of RSFSR from 10 July 1991 before arrest 4 October 1993. As vice president, he openly called for the independence of Transnistria and Crimea from Moldova and Ukraine.

=== Conflict with Ukraine over Crimea ===
In October 1991 Rutskoy went to Kyiv in order to negotiate the price of Russian natural gas exports to Ukraine, and through Ukrainian territory to Europe. On that visit he also claimed Russian control and ownership of the Black Sea fleet, based in Sevastopol, and, indirectly, Russian sovereignty over the whole Crimean Peninsula. Rutskoy publicly warned Ukraine against conflict with Russia, which both had nuclear weapons and had the ability to claim sovereignty over Crimea.

In April 1992 and March 1993 two similar resolutions that claimed Crimea were passed by the Russian Federation parliament. The Ukrainians naturally turned for help to the United States, which sought to aggregate Soviet nuclear weapons in the hands of Moscow and to occupy ex-Soviet scientists with the Nunn–Lugar Cooperative Threat Reduction programme. The Budapest Memorandum provided security assurances to the three ex-Soviet countries Ukraine, Belarus and Kazakhstan in exchange to their accession to the nuclear non-proliferation treaty. By the end of 1996 all nuclear weapons were removed to Russian territory.

=== Russian constitutional crisis of 1993 ===
Following the initial period of peaceful collaboration with Yeltsin, from the end of 1992, Rutskoy began openly declaring his opposition to the President's economic and foreign policies and accusing some Russian government officials of corruption. For instance, an account stated that he refused to shake the hands of Sergei Filatov, head of the Executive Office of the President, calling him a scum. Rutskoy claimed that Filatov reduced the number of vice presidential staff in response the day after the incident. Rutskoy was accused of corruption by the officials of Yeltsin's government. On 1 September 1993, President Boris Yeltsin suspended Rutskoy's execution of his vice-presidential duties, due to alleged corruption charges, which was not further confirmed. On 3 September, the Supreme Soviet rejected Yeltsin's suspension of Rutskoy and referred the question to the Constitutional Court.

On 21 September 1993, President Yeltsin dissolved the Supreme Soviet of Russia, which was in direct contradiction with the articles of Soviet Constitution of 1978, especially Article 121–6, which stated: "The powers of the President of Russian Federation cannot be used to change national and state organization of Russian Federation, to dissolve or to interfere with the functioning of any elected organs of state power. In this case, his powers cease immediately." On the night of 21–22 September 1993, Rutskoy ascended the podium of the Russian parliament, and assumed the powers of acting President of Russia at 00:25, in accordance with the above article. He took the presidential oath, and said: "I am taking the authority of President. The anti-constitutional decree of President Yeltsin is annulled." Rutskoy's interim presidency, although constitutional, was never acknowledged outside Russia. After the two-week standoff, and the violence erupting on the streets of Moscow, on 4 October 1993, the Russian White House was taken by Yeltsin's military forces. Rutskoy and his supporters were arrested and charged with organization of mass disturbances. The day before, Yeltsin officially dismissed Rutskoy as vice president, despite not having legal powers to do so, and fired him from the military forces. Rutskoy was imprisoned in the Moscow Lefortovo prison until 26 February 1994, when he and other participants of both the August 1991 and October 1993 crises were granted amnesty by the State Duma.

Soon after his release, Rutskoy founded a populist, nationalist party, Derzhava (Russian: Держава), which failed in the 1995 legislative election to the State Duma, gathering only about 2.5% of the votes and thus not passing the 5% threshold.

== Governorship ==
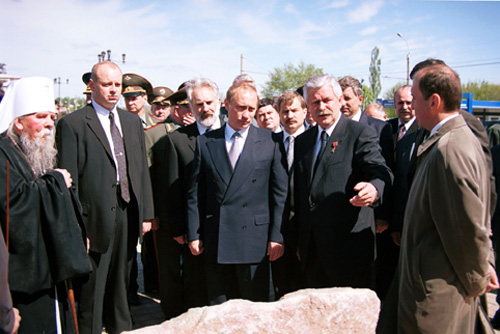
Rutskoy and Putin in May 2000

Rutskoy decided not to run for the presidency in the 1996 election, but did run for the position of the governor of Kursk Oblast in the fall of the same year. Being a joint candidate from the People's Patriotic Union of Russia, he was initially banned from the election, but allowed to run by the Russian Supreme Court only a few days before the election, which he won in a landslide, with about 76% of the vote. It is noted that Rutskoy had the potential to become an opposition leader upon re-entering politics but he adopted a pragmatic and compliant approach in his dealings with the government in Moscow in general and Yeltsin in particular. He has apologized for starting the armed rebellion, explaining that he would not have done it if he knew it would lead to several deaths.

In October 2000, Rutskoy ran for a second term as governor. However, a few hours before the vote on 22 October he was suspended from participation in the elections by the decision of the Kursk Oblast Court for the abuse of official position, inaccurate data on personal property, violations of election campaigning, etc.

Rutskoy submitted to the Supreme Court of Russia a protest against the decision of the Kursk Oblast Court to cancel the registration which was considered by the Civil Board of the Supreme Court and rejected on 2 November 2000.

In December 2001, Rutskoy was sued by the Prosecutor's Office of Kursk Oblast, which filed a lawsuit. The lawsuit was related to the illegal privatization of a four-room apartment (made in July 2000). Later Rutskoi was brought under article 286 of the criminal code (abuse of power) as an accused. The case was closed for lack of evidence, as no evidence was presented in the case.

== Further political activities ==
In the 2003 Russian legislative election, he ran for the State Duma in one of the constituencies of Kursk Oblast. He was not allowed to vote. His registration as a candidate was cancelled by the Supreme Court due to the provision of incorrect information about the place of work in the Central Election Commission.

In the 2014 Russian elections, he again tried to run for Governor of Kursk Oblast, but was not registered due to problems with his nomination process.

In the 2016 Russian legislative election, he again ran for the State Duma as part of the federal list of the party Patriots of Russia and the single-member constituency in Kursk Oblast. The party list did not pass the 5% threshold, and Rutskoy himself lost the election, taking second place in his constituency.
