= Communist Party of the Russian Soviet Federative Socialist Republic =

Communist political party in the Russian Soviet Federative Socialist Republic

Communist Party of the RSFSR Коммунистическая партия РСФСР
- Abbreviation: CPRSFSR (English); КПРСФСР (Russian)
- General Secretary: Ivan Polozkov (1990–91); Valentin Kuptsov (1991–93)
- Founded: 19 June 1990; 36 years ago
- Dissolved: 6 November 1991; 34 years ago
- Succeeded by: Communist Party of the Russian Federation
- Headquarters: Moscow, Russian SFSR
- Youth wing: Union of Communist Youth
- Membership: approx. 6.8 million (1991 est.)
- Ideology: Communism; Marxism–Leninism
- National affiliation: Communist Party of the Soviet Union
- Colours: Red (official)
- Slogan: "Workers of the world, unite!"
- Anthem: "The Internationale" (Note: Russian: Интернациона́л, romanized: Internatsionál)

The Communist Party of the Russian Soviet Federative Socialist Republic (CPRSFSR; Russian: Коммунистическая партия Российской Советской Федеративной Социалистической Республики; КПРСФСР; Kommunisticheskaya partiya Rossiyskoy Sovetskoy Federativnoy Sotsialisticheskoy Respubliki, KPRSFSR), was a communist political party in the Russian SFSR. The Communist Party of the Russian SFSR was founded in 1990. At this point, the Communist Party of the Russian SFSR being the republican branch of the Communist Party of the Soviet Union, organized around 58% of the total Communist Party membership. Politically, it became a centre for communist opponents of Gorbachev's leadership.

== Background ==
For many years, the Russian SFSR had been the sole Soviet republic without a republican-level Communist Party of its own. In fact, in 1947 the NKVD had run an investigation in the so-called Leningrad case against party functionaries accused of wanting to set up a republican Communist Party in the RSFSR.

In 1989 a sector of the Communist Party, opposed to the leadership of Mikhail Gorbachev, launched a campaign for an autonomous Russian republican-level Communist Party. In June 1989 an article was published in Nash sovremennik by Galina Litvinova, arguing that the Russian nation had regressed during Soviet rule and that it was necessary to form a Central Committee for the Communist Party of the RSFSR.

== Preparations ==
The Communist Party of the RSFSR emerged from an alliance between Leningrad-based apparatchiks and Russian national-patriotic tendencies. The United Workers Front was one of the key backers of the new party organization.

Gorbachev faced difficulties in trying to block the formation of a Russian party organization. Many Russian members of the Communist Party who were not necessarily followers of Gorbachev's hard-line opponents were supportive of the effort to form a Russian party organization. On Gorbachev's initiative a RSFSR Bureau of the Communist Party was founded towards the end of 1989, in a move to block the formation of an autonomous Russian Communist Party. However this action did not block the demand for a RSFSR Communist Party, and the newly formed RSFSR Bureau issued a call for the founding of the Communist Party of the RSFSR. This process was humiliating for Gorbachev, as it clarified that he was not fully in control of the party apparatus.

Prior to the founding of the new party organization, a debate surged regarding the name of the new body. Chechen-Ingush communists argued that the name should include "RSFSR" rather than just "Russian". Moreover, decision had been passed that the congress would be divided in two sessions, before and after the 28th party congress of the Communist Party of the Soviet Union.

== First Congress Session ==
The first session of the founding congress of the Communist Party of the RSFSR opened in Moscow on 19 June 1990. 2,768 delegates attended the congress. There were three key contenders for the post of First Secretary, Valentin Kuptsov, Ivan Polozkov and Oleg Lobov (Second Secretary of the Communist Party of Armenia). Kuptsov, the candidate supported by Gorbachev and the all-Union party leadership, suffered a heavy defeat. He received a mere 343 votes in favour whilst 2,278 delegates voted against him. Polozkov obtained 1,017 votes in favour and 1,604 against him, whilst Lobov got 848 votes in favour and 1,773 votes against him. A run-off was held between Polozkov and Lobov. Polozkov was elected with 1,396 against 1,066 for Lobov. The first session of the founding congress concluded on 23 June 1990.

Polozkov was a leader of the hardline faction, hailing from Krasnodar. After having been elected, Polozkov tried to distance himself from the most hardline elements (represented by Nina Andreyeva) and sought conciliation between Gorbachev, Boris Yeltsin and the Communist Party of the RSFSR.

== Second Congress Session ==
The founding congress of the Communist Party of the RSFSR reconvened at its second session from 4 September to 6 September 1990. The second session elected 272 Central Committee members and 96 Central Control Commission members for the party. By then, the political struggle had sharpened; Polozkov called on the communists in the RSFSR to oppose the restoration of capitalism by Yeltsin's government. The Communist Party of the RSFSR had, then, around 40% of the seats in the newly formed Supreme Soviet of the RSFSR.

== Political role ==
The new party organization was divided into reformist, hardline and nationalistic sectors. Polozkov played an important role as defining the role of the party as force of the anti-Perestroika opposition. However, his style of leadership was passive and he came under attack from all corners inside the party. The deputies in the RSFSR Supreme Soviet attacked him for not attacking Gorbachev, whilst the communists in Kaliningrad criticized him for his opposition against Yeltsin.

The launching of the Communist Party of the RSFSR caused organizational problems for the Communist Party of the Soviet Union, as membership fees from the RSFSR were now supposed to pass through the republican party organization. Some lower-level party organization did however continue to pay their dues directly to the all-Union party, essentially as acts of defiance against the hardliners in control of the Communist Party of the RSFSR. The party became a member of the Coordinating Council of Patriotic Forces, which campaigned for a unified Soviet Union in the March 1991 referendum.

== Removal of Polozkov ==
On 6 August 1991, Polozkov was removed from his position as leader of the Communist Party of the RSFSR, after having called Gorbachev a traitor three days earlier. Kuptsov was named as the new First Secretary of the party.

== Banning ==
In the fall of 1991, Yeltsin issued three presidential decrees resulting in the disbanding of the party. On 23 August 1991, he issued a decree titled "On Suspending the Activities of the Communist Party of the RSFSR". On 25 August 1991, Yeltsin issued a Decree No. 90 declared that the activities of the party were suspended and that all the properties of the Communist Party of the RSFSR would become RSFSR state property. And on 6 November 1991, he issued a decree that banned the already defunct party.

On November 30, 1992, the Constitutional Court of the Russian Federation recognized the ban on the activities of the primary organizations of the Communist Party, formed on a territorial basis, as inconsistent with the Constitution of Russia, but upheld the dissolution of the governing structures of the CPSU and the governing structures of its republican organization - the Communist Party of the RSFSR.

On 14 February 1993, the Communist Party of the Russian Federation was formed at a Second Extraordinary Congress, declaring itself as the successor to the Communist Party of the RSFSR. The reconstituted party was led by Gennady Zyuganov, formerly the chief ideologue of the Communist Party of the RSFSR and a member of the Secretariat of the Communist Party of the RSFSR.
