= List of economy ministers of Russia =

This is a list of ministers of economy of Russia.

== Russian SFSR ==
=== Head of State Committee of Economy ===
| Minister | Political party | Term of office | | Cabinet |
|---|---|---|---|---|
| Gennady Falshin | Independent | 14 July 1990 | 13 February 1991 | Silayev I |
| Leonid Zapalsky (acting) | Independent | 13 February 1991 | 30 July 1991 | Silayev I |

=== Minister of Economy ===
| Minister | Political party | Term of office | | Cabinet |
|---|---|---|---|---|
| Yevgeny Saburov | Independent | 15 August 1991 | 15 November 1991 | Silayev II |

=== Minister of Economy and Finance ===
| Minister | Political party | Term of office | | Cabinet |
|---|---|---|---|---|
| Yegor Gaidar | Independent | 11 November 1991 | 25 December 1991 | Yeltsin—Gaidar |

== Russian Federation ==
=== Minister of Economy and Finance ===
| Minister | Political party | Term of office | | Cabinet |
|---|---|---|---|---|
| Yegor Gaidar | Independent | 25 December 1991 | 19 February 1992 | Yeltsin–Gaidar |

=== Ministers of Economy ===
| Minister | Political party | Term of office | | Cabinet |
|---|---|---|---|---|
| Andrey Nechaev | Independent | 19 February 1992 | 25 March 1993 | Yeltsin–Gaidar |
| Andrey Nechaev | Independent | 19 February 1992 | 25 March 1993 | Chernomyrdin I |
| Andrey Shapovalyants (acting) | Independent | 25 March 1993 | 15 April 1993 | Chernomyrdin I |
| Oleg Lobov | Independent | 15 April 1993 | 18 September 1993 | Chernomyrdin I |
| Yegor Gaidar (acting) | Democratic Choice | 18 September 1993 | 20 January 1994 | Chernomyrdin I |
| Alexander Shokhin | Independent | 20 January 1994 | 6 November 1994 | Chernomyrdin I |
| Yevgeny Yasin | Independent | 8 November 1994 | 17 March 1997 | Chernomyrdin I |
| Yevgeny Yasin | Independent | 8 November 1994 | 17 March 1997 | Chernomyrdin II |
| Yakov Urinson | Independent | 17 March 1997 | 25 September 1998 | Chernomyrdin II |
| Yakov Urinson | Independent | 17 March 1997 | 25 September 1998 | Kiriyenko |
| Andrey Shapovalyants | Independent | 25 September 1998 | 7 May 2000 | Primakov |
| Andrey Shapovalyants | Independent | 25 September 1998 | 7 May 2000 | Stepashin |
| Andrey Shapovalyants | Independent | 25 September 1998 | 7 May 2000 | Putin I |

=== Ministers of Economic Development and Trade ===
| Minister | Political party | Term of office | | Cabinet |
|---|---|---|---|---|
| Herman Gref | Independent | 18 May 2000 | 24 September 2007 | Kasyanov |
| Herman Gref | Independent | 18 May 2000 | 24 September 2007 | Fradkov I |
| Herman Gref | Independent | 18 May 2000 | 24 September 2007 | Fradkov II |
| Elvira Nabiullina | Independent | 24 September 2007 | 12 May 2008 | Zubkov |

=== Ministers of Economic Development ===
| Minister | Political party | Term of office | | Cabinet |
|---|---|---|---|---|
| Elvira Nabiullina | Independent | 12 May 2008 | 21 May 2012 | Putin II |
| Andrey Belousov | Independent | 21 May 2012 | 24 June 2013 | Medvedev I |
| Alexey Ulyukaev | United Russia | 24 June 2013 | 15 November 2016 | Medvedev I |
| Yevgeny Yelin (acting) | Independent | 15 November 2016 | 30 November 2016 | Medvedev I |
| Maxim Oreshkin | United Russia | 30 November 2016 | 21 January 2020 | Medvedev I |
| Maxim Oreshkin | United Russia | 30 November 2016 | 21 January 2020 | Medvedev II |
| Maxim Reshetnikov | United Russia | 21 January 2020 | Incumbent | Mishustin I |
| Maxim Reshetnikov | United Russia | 21 January 2020 | Incumbent | Mishustin II |
