= Ivan Silayev's Second Cabinet =

Council of Ministers, Russia

Second cabinet of Ivan Silayev
- 41st Cabinet of Russia

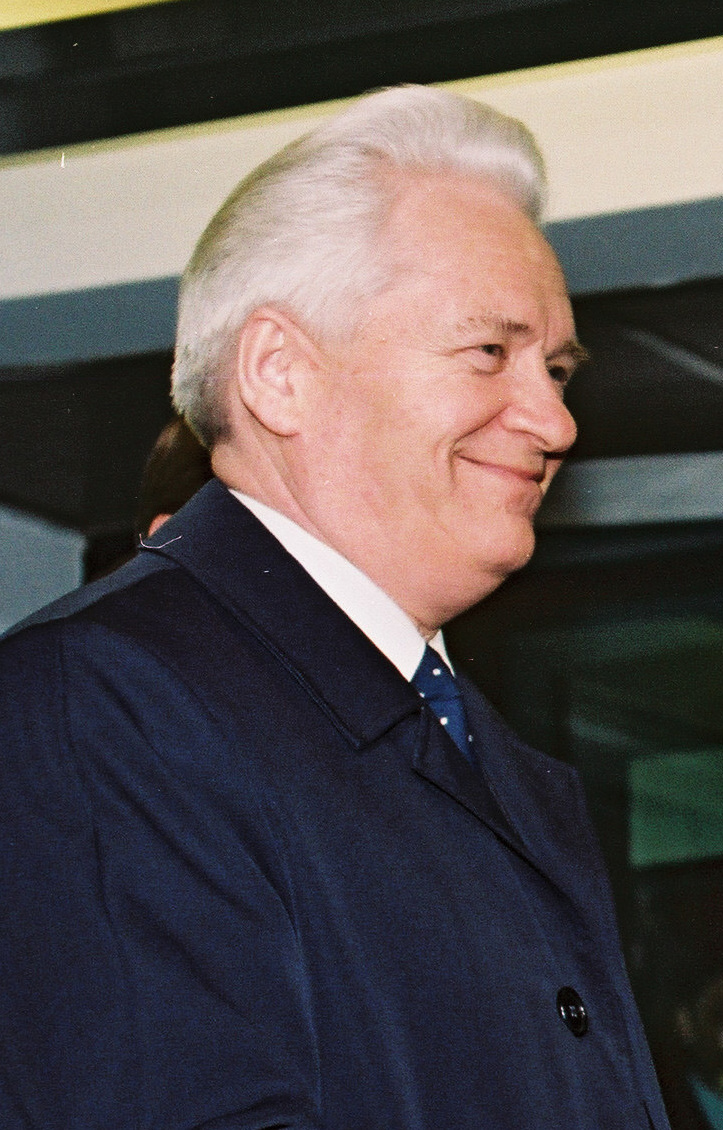
- Date formed: 25 July 1991
- Date dissolved: 15 November 1991

People and organisations
- Head of state: Boris Yeltsin
- Head of government: Ivan Silayev; Oleg Lobov (acting)

History
- Predecessor: Silayev I
- Successor: Yeltsin—Gaidar

Second cabinet of Ivan Silayev was the last composition of the Council of Ministers of the Russian Soviet Federative Socialist Republic, working from July to November 1991. Most of its members kept their positions from the Ivan Silayev's First Cabinet which was dissolved after Boris Yeltsin officially took office as president on 10 July 1991.

== Composition ==
Post	Name	Period
Chairman of the Council of Ministers	Ivan Silayev	13 July – 26 September 1991
Chairman of the Council of Ministers	Oleg Lobov (de facto acting)	26 September — 15 November 1991
Deputy Chairmen of the Council of Ministers
First Deputy Chairman	Oleg Lobov	15 July — 15 November 1991
Deputy Chairmen	Igor Gavrilov	25 July — 15 November 1991
Deputy Chairmen	Inga Grebesheva	25 July — 15 November 1991
Deputy Chairmen	Gennady Kulik	30 July — 15 November 1991
Deputy Chairmen	Mikhail Maley	25 July — 15 November 1991
Deputy Chairmen	Yevgeny Saburov	15 August — 15 November 1991
Deputy Chairmen	Alexander Kamenev	9 September — 15 November 1991
Ministers
Minister of External Economic Relations	Viktor Yaroshenko (acting)	to 2 October 1991
Minister of Economy	Yevgeny Saburov	15 August — 15 November 1991
Minister of Interior	Viktor Barannikov	27 July — 13 September 1991
Minister of Interior	Andrey Dunayev	13 September — 15 November 1991
Minister of Provision	Leonid Cheshinsky	5 August — 15 November 1991
Minister of Health	Vyacheslav Kalinin (acting)	
Minister of Foreign Affairs	Andrei Kozyrev	25 July — 15 November 1991
Minister of Culture	Yury Solomin	25 July — 15 November 1991
Minister of Forestry	Valery Shubin	2 August — 15 November 1991
Minister of Defence	Konstantin Kobets	20 August — 9 September 1991
Minister of Education	Eduard Dneprov	16 August — 15 November 1991
Minister of Press and Mass Media	Mikhail Poltoranin	25 July — 15 November 1991
Minister for Communications, Informatics and Space	Vladimir Bulgak	25 July — 15 November 1991
Minister of Industry	Viktor Kisin	9 September — 15 November 1991
Minister of Agriculture and Food	Gennady Kulik	30 July — 15 November 1991
Minister of Fuel and Energy	Anatoly Dyakov	25 July — 15 November 1991
Minister of Trade	Alexander Khlystov	14 August — 15 November 1991
Minister of Transport	Vitaly Yefimov	2 August — 15 November 1991
Minister of Labour	Rafik Batkayev (acting)	to 26 August 1991
Minister of Labour	Alexander Shokhin	26 August — 15 November 1991
Minister of Finance	Igor Lazarev	25 July — 15 November 1991
Minister of Ecology and Nature Management	Igor Gavrilov	25 July — 15 November 1991
Minister of Social Welfare	Sergey Ivchenkov (acting)	
Minister of Justice	Nikolay Fyodorov	2 August — 15 November 1991
State Committees
Chairman of the KGB of the RSFSR	Viktor Ivanenko	5 August — 15 November 1991
Chairman of the State Licensing Committee	Viktor Yaroshenko	9 August — 15 November 1991
Chairman of the State Committee for Antimonopoly Policy and Support for New Economic Structures	Valery Chernogorodsky	5 August — 15 November 1991
Chairman of the State Committee on Architecture and Construction	Boris Furmanov	9 August — 15 November 1991
Chairman of the State Committee on Geology and Subsoil Use	Dmitry Fyodorov	5 August — 15 November 1991
Chairman of the State Committee for Science and Higher Education	Nikolay Malyshev	9 August — 15 November 1991
Chairman of the State Committee for Nationalities	Leonid Prokopyev (acting)	
Chairman of the State Committee on Housing and Communal Services	Alexey Poryadin	5 August — 15 November 1991
Chairman of the State Committee on Employment	Anatoly Arzamastsev	5 August — 15 November 1991
Chairman of the State Committee on Land Reform and Support of Peasant (Farmer) Households	Viktor Khlystun	9 September — 15 November 1991
Chairman of the State Committee on Liquidation of the Consequences of the Chernobyl disaster	Semyon Voloshchuk (acting)	
Chairman of the State Committee for the Material and Technical Support of Republican and Regional Programs	Vladimir Vozhagov	2 August — 15 November 1991
Chairman of the State Committee on Youth Politics	Andrey Sharonov	9 August — 15 November 1991
Chairman of the State Committee on Supervision of Radiation Safety	Yury Vishnevsky	14 August — 15 November 1991
Chairman of the State Committee on Defence Issues	Konstantin Kobets (acting)	to 29 October 1991
Chairman of the State Committee on Defence Issues	Pavel Grachyov	29 October — 15 November 1991
Chairman of the State Committee on the Socio-Economic Development of the North	Yevgeny Komarov	9 September — 15 November 1991
Chairman of the State Committee on State Property Management	Mikhail Maley	14 August — 15 November 1991
Chairman of the State Committee on Physical Culture and Sports	Vasily Machuga	2 August — 15 November 1991
Chairman of the State Committee for Civil Defense, Emergency Situations and Elimination of the Consequences of Natural Disasters	Sergei Shoigu	5 August — 15 November 1991
Chairman of the State Committee for Sanitary and Epidemiological Surveillance	Yevgeny Belyayev	2 August — 15 November 1991
Chief Executive Officer of the Council of Ministers	Alexander Tretyakov (acting)	to 5 August 1991
Plenipotentiary Representative of the Chairman of the Council of Ministers with the rank of Minister	Valentin Sergeyev	16 August — 19 October 1991

== Sources ==
- "Составы правительств с 1990 по 1998 год" [Compositions of government from 1990 to 1998]. Rossiyskaya Gazeta (in Russian). 2011-02-21.
