= Valery Makharadze =

Russian politician

- Валерий Махарадзе

Deputy Prime Minister of Russia
- In office 2 March 1992 – 23 December 1992
- President: Boris Yeltsin
- Prime Minister: Boris Yeltsin; Yegor Gaidar (acting)

Chief State Inspector
- In office 14 August 1991 – 2 March 1992
- Preceded by: Position established
- Succeeded by: Yury Boldyrev

Chairman of Volgograd Oblast Council of People's Deputies
- In office 1990–1991
- Preceded by: Position established
- Succeeded by: Aleksandr Morozov

Personal details
- Born: Valery Antonovich Makharadze; 5 March 1940 Makhachkala, Dagestan ASSR, Russian SFSR, Soviet Union
- Died: 15 November 2008 (aged 68) Ottawa, Canada
- Spouse: Maysarat Makharadze
- Profession: Politician

Valery Antonovich Makharadze (Russian: Валерий Антонович Махарадзе; 5 March 1940 – 15 November 2008) was a Russian politician who held a number of senior posts during the presidency of Boris Yeltsin, including deputy prime minister. He was removed from the latter office with the dissolution of the cabinet of Boris Yeltsin and Yegor Gaidar and the creation of Viktor Chernomyrdin's first cabinet.

== Career in government ==
Under the USSR, Makharadze served as the chairman of the Volgograd Oblast soviet.

In 1991, Makharadze's role was to manage the relations between the federal government and the various regional administrations of Russia, as a member of Boris Yeltsin's team. He was also involved in removing former Communist officials for suspected corruption as the Yeltsin administration's chief inspector, including what was referred to as "nomenklatura privatization." In March 1992 he was appointed one of the Deputy Prime Ministers in Yeltsin's cabinet, being in charge of managing relations between the regions and the government in Moscow. As part of this, Makharadze and nationality minister Valery Tishkov signed an agreement with the German government to help resettle Volga Germans in their native region. Among his other tasks was to oversee the implementation of economic reforms begun by the central government in the regions. However, when Boris Yeltsin was making concessions to conservative opposition factions in order to gain approval for his economic privatization policies, despite the resignation of Deputy Prime Minister Mikhail Poltoranin it was expected the Makharadze would be forced to resign too. He suggested during this time that a stronger presidential administration was needed. Makharadze was removed from the position of deputy prime minister in December 1992, upon the formation of the new cabinet.

He later worked at the Russian embassy in Canada as a trade and commercial attaché, until at least 2003.

== Sources ==
=== Books ===
- Friedgut, Theodore H. (1994). Local Power and Post-Soviet Politics. Routledge. ISBN 978-1563244049.
- Huskey, Eugene (1992). Executive Power and Soviet Politics. Routledge. ISBN 978-1563240607.
