= Ivan Silayev's First Cabinet =

Council of Ministers, Russia

First cabinet of Ivan Silayev
- 40th Cabinet of Russia

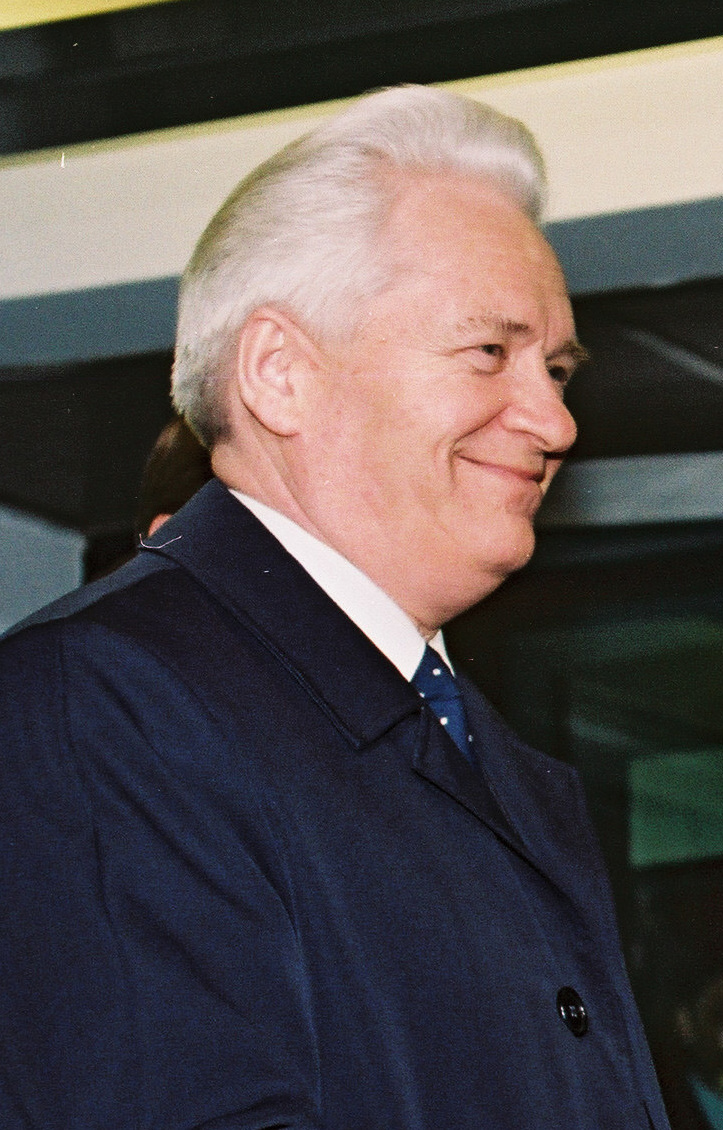
- Date formed: 14 July 1990
- Date dissolved: 10 July 1991

People and organisations
- Head of state: Boris Yeltsin
- Head of government: Ivan Silayev

History
- Predecessor: Vlasov
- Successor: Silayev II

The first cabinet of Ivan Silayev was the composition of the Council of Ministers of the Russian Soviet Federative Socialist Republic in office from July 1990 to July 1991.

It was formed shortly after the election of the 12th Supreme Soviet of Russia by the Congress of People's Deputies and subsequent resignation of Alexander Vlasov's Cabinet. Also, the government reform was held at the time, which made the Chairman of the Supreme Council the head of the republic in the RSFSR, dissolving the Presidium as the highest authority. Vlasov lost the chairman election to Boris Yeltsin, who would become the first President of Russia a year later. After his inauguration on 10 July 1991 Silayev's first cabinet resigned.

== Composition ==
Portfolio	Minister	Took office	Left office
Chairman of the Council of Ministers	Ivan Silayev	18 June 1990	10 July 1991
First Deputy Chairman of the Council of Ministers	Gennady Kulik	14 July 1990	10 July 1991
First Deputy Chairman of the Council of Ministers	Yury Skokov	8 September 1990	10 July 1991
First Deputy Chairman of the Council of Ministers	Oleg Lobov	19 April 1991	10 July 1991
Deputy Chairman of the Council of Ministers	Gennady Filshin	14 July 1990	13 February 1991
Deputy Chairman of the Council of Ministers	Inga Grebesheva	31 January 1991	10 July 1991
Deputy Chairman of the Council of Ministers	Grigory Yavlinsky	14 July 1990	22 November 1990
Deputy Chairman of the Council of Ministers	Nikolay Malyshev	14 July 1990	10 July 1991
Deputy Chairman of the Council of Ministers	Mikhail Maley	31 October 1990	10 July 1991
Deputy Chairman of the Council of Ministers	Igor Gavrilov	14 July 1990	10 July 1991
Deputy Chairman of the Council of Ministers	Alexander Kamenev	18 February 1991	10 July 1991
Minister of Agriculture and Food	Gennady Kulik	14 July 1990	10 July 1991
Minister of Bakery Products	Leonid Cheshinsky	8 September 1990	10 July 1991
Minister for Communications, Informatics and Space	Vladimir Bulgak	14 July 1990	10 July 1991
Minister of Culture	Yury Solomin	8 September 1990	10 July 1991
Minister of Education	Eduard Dneprov	14 July 1990	10 July 1991
Minister of Fuel and Energy	Anatoly Dyakov	13 May 1991	10 July 1991
Minister of External Economic Relations	Viktor Yaroshenko	14 July 1990	10 July 1991
Minister of Finance	Boris Fyodorov	14 July 1990	28 December 1990
Minister of Finance	Igor Lazarev	28 December 1990	10 July 1991
Minister of Foreign Affairs	Andrei Kozyrev	11 October 1990	10 July 1991
Minister of Forestry	Valery Shubin	8 September 1990	10 July 1991
Minister of Health	Anatoly Potapov (acting)	14 July 1990	19 September 1990
Minister of Health	Vyacheslav Kalinin	19 September 1990	10 July 1991
Minister of Industry	Viktor Kisin	14 July 1990	10 July 1991
Minister of Internal Affairs	Vasily Trushin (acting)	14 July 1990	8 September 1990
Minister of Internal Affairs	Viktor Barannikov	8 September 1990	10 July 1991
Minister of Justice	Nikolay Fyodorov	14 July 1990	10 July 1991
Minister of Labour	Rafik Batkayev	14 July 1990	10 July 1991
Minister of Press and Mass Media	Mikhail Poltoranin	14 July 1990	10 July 1991
Minister of Social Welfare	Sergey Ivchenkov (acting)	11 September 1990	10 July 1991
Minister of Trade	Alexander Khlystov	8 September 1990	10 July 1991
Minister of Transport	Vitaly Yefimov	8 September 1990	10 July 1991

Post	Name	Period
Chairman of the KGB of the RSFSR	Viktor Ivanenko (acting)	5 May — 10 July 1991
Chairman of the State Committee for Antimonopoly Policy and Support for New Economic Structures	Valery Chernogorodsky	11 October 1990 — 10 July 1991
Chairman of the State Committee on Architecture and Construction	Boris Furmanov	11 October 1990 — 10 July 1991
Chairman of the State Committee for Defence and Security	Konstantin Kobets	31 January – 5 May 1991
Chairman of the State Committee of Defence Issues	Konstantin Kobets	17 May – 10 July 1991
Chairman of the State Committee for Ecology and Nature Management	Igor Gavrilov	14 July 1990 – 10 July 1991
Chairman of the State Committee for Economy	Gennady Filshin	14 July 1990 – 13 February 1991
Chairman of the State Committee for Economic Reform	Grigory Yavlinsky	14 July – 22 November 1990
Chairman of the State Committee on Employment	Anatoly Arzamastsev	7 June – 10 July 1991
Chairman of the State Committee on Geology and Subsoil Use	Dmitry Fyodorov	14 July 1990 – 10 July 1991
Chairman of the State Committee on Housing and Communal Services	Alexey Poryadin	8 February – 10 July 1991
Chairman of the State Committee on Land Reform	Viktor Khlystun	31 October 1990 – 10 July 1991
Chairman of the State Committee on Liquidation of the Consequences of the Chernobyl disaster	Semyon Voloshchuk	11 October 1990 – 10 July 1991
Chairman of the State Committee for the Material and Technical Support of Republican and Regional Programs	Vladimir Vozhagov	14 July 1990 – 10 July 1991
Chairman of the State Committee for Nationalities	Leonid Prokopyev	31 October 1990 – 10 July 1991
Chairman of the State Committee on Physical Culture and Sports	Vasily Machuga	8 September 1990 — 10 July 1991
Head of the Russian Rescue Corps	Sergei Shoigu	17 April — 10 July 1991
Chairman of the State Committee on the Socio-Economic Development of the North	Yevgeny Komarov	11 October 1990 — 10 July 1991
Chairman of the State Committee on State Property Management	Mikhail Maley	31 October 1990 — 10 July 1991
Chairman of the State Committee for Sanitary and Epidemiological Surveillance	Yevgeny Belyayev	30 May – 10 July 1991
Chairman of the State Committee for Science and Higher Education	Nikolay Malyshev	14 July 1990 – 10 July 1991
Chief Executive Officer of the Council of Ministers	Aleksandr Sterligov	14 July – 31 October 1990
Chief Executive Officer of the Council of Ministers	Alexander Tretyakov	29 November 1990 – 10 July 1991

== Sources ==
- "Составы правительств с 1990 по 1998 год" [Compositions of government from 1990 to 1998]. Rossiyskaya Gazeta (in Russian). 2011-02-21.
