= Cabinet of Boris Yeltsin and Yegor Gaidar =

- 42nd Cabinet of Russia

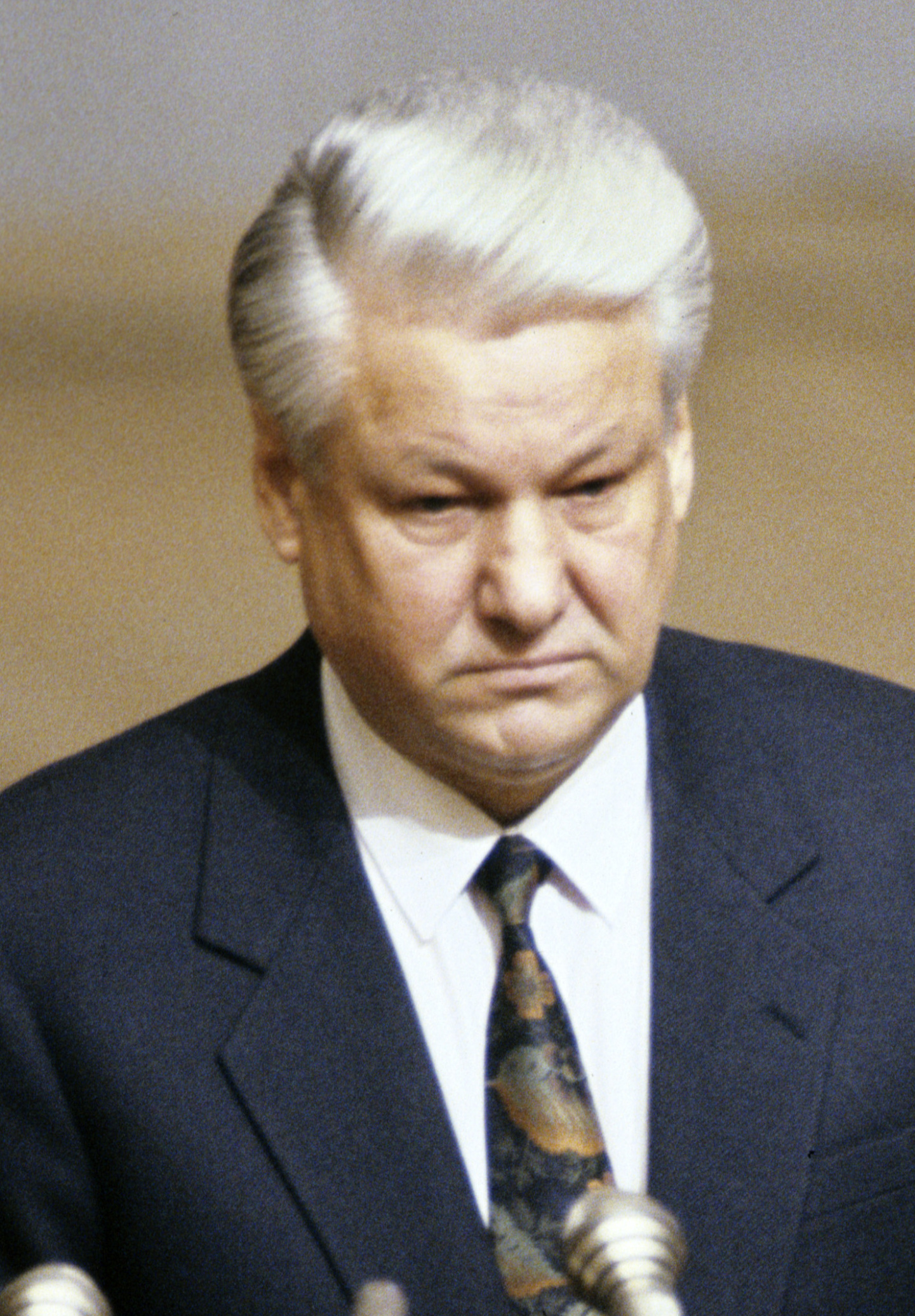
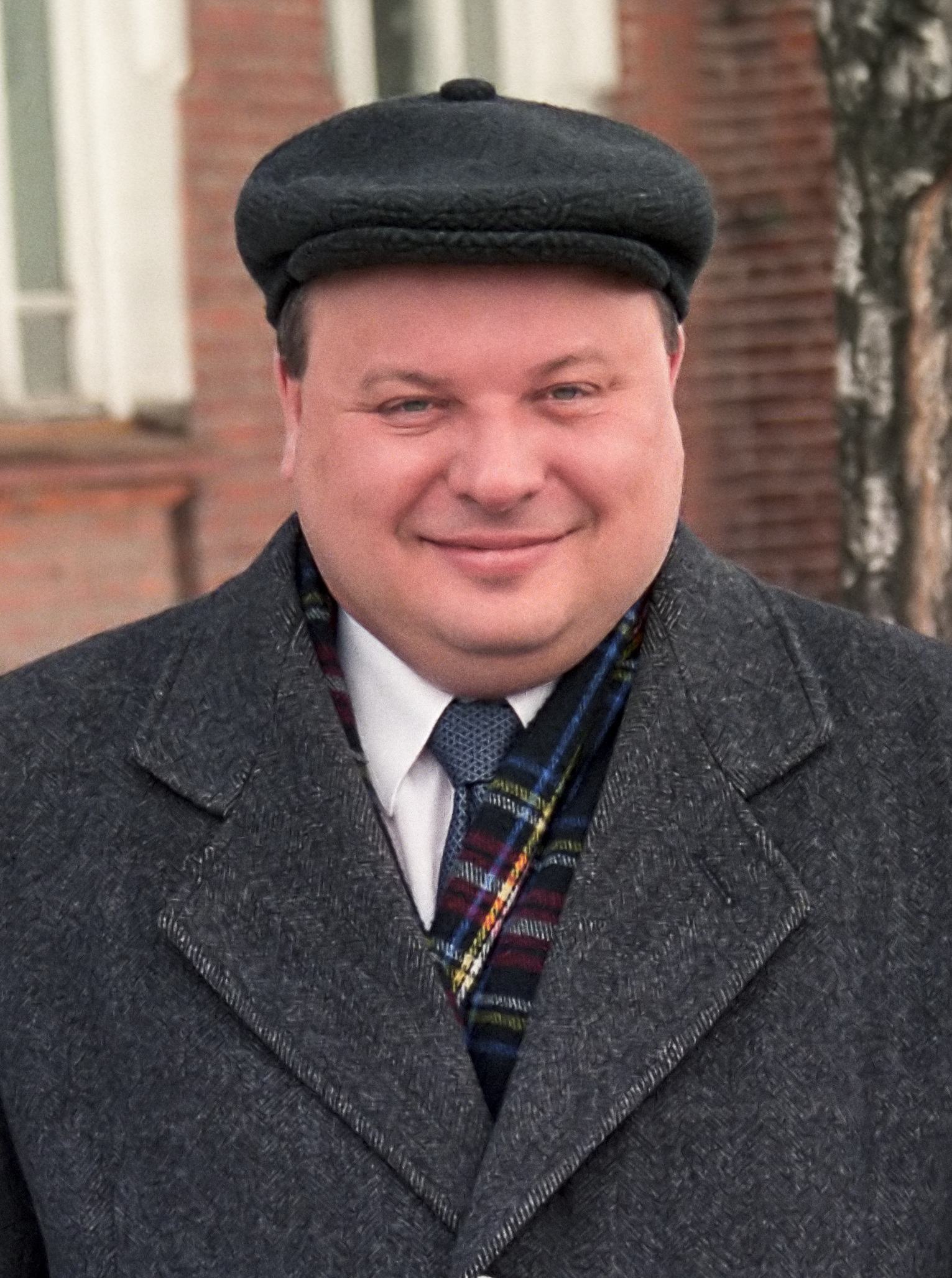
- Date formed: 6 November 1991
- Date dissolved: 23 December 1992

People and organisations
- Head of state: Boris Yeltsin
- Head of government: Boris Yeltsin (interim); Yegor Gaidar (acting)
- Head of government's history: 1991–1999
- Deputy head of government: Yegor Gaidar; Gennady Burbulis; Vladimir Shumeyko
- No. of ministers: 34
- Member party: Independent
- Status in legislature: Majority 920 / 1,068

History
- Predecessor: Silayev II
- Successor: Chernomyrdin I

Cabinet of Boris Yeltsin and Yegor Gaidar was Russian Cabinet of Ministers under the leadership of President Boris Yeltsin and First Deputy Prime Minister Yegor Gaidar, which was in office from 6 November 1991 to 23 December 1992.

Yeltsin led the Council of Ministers to carry out radical economic reforms aimed at liberalizing the Russian economy. He headed the Cabinet since 6 November 1991 to 15 June 1992. From 15 June to 14 December 1992, the Cabinet was directed by the acting Prime Minister Gaidar.

In December 1992, Boris Yeltsin proposed to the Congress of People's Deputies of Russia Gaidar's candidacy for the post of Prime Minister of Russia, however, he was denied by the people's deputies.

23 December Gaidar was replaced by the cabinet of Viktor Chernomyrdin.

== Ministers ==
Ministries and committees in italics have been renamed, merged or abolished.

| Portfolio | Minister | Took office | Left office | Party |
|---|---|---|---|---|
| Chairman of the Government | Boris Yeltsin | 6 November 1991 | 15 June 1992 | Independent |
| Chairman of the Government | Yegor Gaidar (acting) | 15 June 1992 | 14 December 1992 | Independent |
| Chairman of the Government | Viktor Chernomyrdin | 14 December 1992 | 23 December 1992 | Independent |
| First Deputy Chairman of the Government | Gennady Burbulis | 6 November 1991 | 14 April 1992 | Independent |
| First Deputy Chairman of the Government | Yegor Gaidar | 2 March 1992 | 15 December 1992 | Independent |
| First Deputy Chairman of the Government | Vladimir Shumeyko | 2 June 1992 | 23 December 1992 | Independent |
| Deputy Chairman of the Government on Social Policy | Alexander Shokhin | 6 November 1991 | 23 December 1992 | Independent |
| Deputy Chairman of the Government on Economic Policy | Yegor Gaidar | 6 November 1991 | 2 March 1992 | Independent |
| Deputy Chairman of the Government on the Fuel and Energy Complex | Viktor Chernomyrdin | 30 May 1992 | 14 December 1992 | Independent |
| Deputy Chairman of the Government | Sergey Shakhray | 12 December 1991; 11 November 1992 | 20 April 1992; 23 December 1992 | Independent |
| Deputy Chairman of the Government | Mikhail Poltoranin | 22 February 1992 | 25 November 1992 | Independent |
| Deputy Chairman of the Government | Valery Makharadze | 2 March 1992 | 23 December 1992 | Independent |
| Deputy Chairman of the Government | Georgy Khizha | 20 May 1992 | 23 December 1992 | Independent |
| Deputy Chairman of the Government | Anatoly Chubais | 1 June 1992 | 23 December 1992 | Independent |
| Deputy Chairman of the Government | Boris Saltykov | 4 June 1992 | 23 December 1992 | Independent |
| Ministry of Architecture, Construction and Housing and Communal Services | Boris Furmanov | 27 November 1991 | 30 September 1992 | Independent |
| Ministry of Security and Interior | Viktor Barannikov | 19 December 1991 | 14 January 1992 | Independent |
| Ministry of Security | Viktor Barannikov | 24 January 1992 | 23 December 1992 | Independent |
| Ministry of Foreign Economic Relations | Gennady Filshin (acting) | 6 November 1991 | 11 November 1991 | Independent |
| Ministry of Foreign Economic Relations | Petr Aven | 22 February 1992 | 23 December 1992 | Independent |
| Ministry of Internal Affairs | Andrei Dunayev | 14 November 1991 | 15 January 1992 | Independent |
| Ministry of Internal Affairs | Viktor Yerin | 15 January 1992 | 23 December 1992 | Independent |
| Ministry of Health | Vyacheslav Kalinin (acting) | 6 November 1991 | 14 November 1991 | Independent |
| Ministry of Health | Andrei Vorobyov | 14 November 1991; 28 October 1992 | 23 October 1992; 23 December 1992 | Independent |
| Ministry of Foreign Affairs | Andrei Kozyrev | 14 November 1991 | 23 December 1992 | Independent |
| Ministry of Culture and Tourism | Yury Solomin (acting) | 6 November 1991 | 5 December 1991 | Independent |
| Ministry of Culture and Tourism | Yevgeny Sidorov | 5 February 1992 | 30 September 1992 | Independent |
| Ministry of Forestry | Valery Shubin (acting) | 6 November 1991 | 10 November 1991 | Independent |
| Ministry of Science, Higher Education and Technical Policy | Boris Saltykov | 11 November 1991 | 23 December 1992 | Independent |
| Ministry of Defence | Boris Yeltsin (acting) | 16 March 1992 | 18 May 1992 | Independent |
| Ministry of Defence | Pavel Grachev | 18 May 1992 | 23 December 1992 | Independent |
| Ministry of Education | Eduard Dneprov | 6 November 1991 | 4 December 1992 | Independent |
| Ministry of Education | Yevgeny Tkachenko (acting) | 5 December 1992 | 23 December 1992 | Independent |
| Ministry of Environment and Natural Resources | Viktor Danilov-Danilyan | 12 November 1992 | 23 December 1992 | Independent |
| Ministry of Press and Information | Mikhail Poltoranin | 6 November 1991 | 25 November 1992 | Independent |
| Ministry of Atomic Energy | Viktor Mikhaylov | 2 March 1992 | 23 December 1992 | Independent |
| Ministry of Industry | Viktor Kisin (acting) | 6 November 1991 | 15 November 1991 | Independent |
| Ministry of Industry | Aleksandr Titkin | 15 November 1991 | 30 September 1992 | Independent |
| Ministry of Railways | Gennady Fadeev | 20 January 1992 | 23 December 1992 | Independent |
| Ministry of Agriculture | Gennady Kulik (acting) | 6 November 1991 | 15 November 1991 | Independent |
| Ministry of Agriculture | Viktor Khlystun | 15 November 1991 | 30 September 1992 | Independent |
| Ministry of Social Protection | Ella Pamfilova | 15 November 1991 | 23 December 1992 | Independent |
| Ministry of Communications | Vladimir Bulgak | 10 November 1991 | 23 December 1992 | Independent |
| Ministry of Fuel and Energy | Vladimir Lopukhin | 10 November 1991 | 30 May 1992 | Independent |
| Ministry of Trade and Material Resources | Alexander Khlystov (acting) | 6 November 1991 | 10 November 1991 | Independent |
| Ministry of Trade and Material Resources | Stanislav Anisimov | 10 November 1991 | 16 September 1992 | Independent |
| Ministry of Transport | Vitaly Efimov | 6 November 1991 | 23 December 1992 | Independent |
| Ministry of Labour | Alexander Shokhin | 10 November 1991 | 14 June 1992 | Independent |
| Ministry of Labour | Gennady Melikyan | 14 June 1992 | 23 December 1992 | Independent |
| Ministry of Finance | Igor Lazarev (acting) | 6 November 1991 | 11 November 1991 | Independent |
| Ministry of Finance | Yegor Gaidar | 19 February 1992 | 2 April 1992 | Independent |
| Ministry of Finance | Vasily Barchuk | 2 April 1992 | 23 December 1992 | Independent |
| Ministry of Justice | Nikolay Fyodorov | 6 November 1991 | 23 December 1992 | Independent |
| Ministry of Economics | Yevgeny Saburov (acting) | 6 November 1991 | 11 November 1991 | Independent |
| Ministry of Economics | Andrey Nechaev | 19 February 1992 | 23 December 1992 | Independent |
| Ministry of Economy and Finance | Yegor Gaidar | 11 November 1991 | 19 February 1992 | Independent |
| Ministry of Ecology | Igor Gavrilov (acting) | 6 November 1991 | 10 November 1991 | Independent |
| Ministry of Ecology | Viktor Danilov-Danilyan | 10 November 1991 | 30 September 1992 | Independent |
| Federal Security Agency (with ministry rights) | Viktor Ivanenko | 26 November 1991 | 15 January 1992 | Independent |
| Federal Security Agency (with ministry rights) | Viktor Barannikov | 15 January 1992 | 24 January 1992 | Independent |
| Federal Center for Land and Agro-Industrial Reform (with ministry rights) | Vitaly Yermolenko | 1 August 1992 | 23 December 1992 | Independent |
| Committee for State Security | Viktor Ivanenko | 14 November 1991 | 26 November 1991 | Independent |
| State Committee for Antimonopoly Policy and Support for New Economic Structures | Leonid Bochin | 30 September 1992 | 23 December 1992 | Independent |
| State Committee for Civil Defense, Emergency Situations and Elimination of the Consequences of Natural Disasters | Sergei Shoigu | 24 October 1992 | 23 December 1992 | Independent |
| State Committee for Conversion Affairs | Mikhail Bazhanov | 19 November 1991 | 24 February 1992 | Independent |
| State Committee for National Policy | Valery Tishkov | 27 February 1992 | 15 October 1992 | Independent |
| State Committee for National Policy | Sergey Shakhray | 11 November 1992 | 23 December 1992 | Independent |
| State Committee for Defense Issues | Pavel Grachev (acting) | 13 November 1991 | 26 March 1992 | Independent |
| State Committee for Social Protection of Citizens and Rehabilitation of Territories Affected by Chernobyl and Other Radiation Disasters | Semyon Voloshchuk | 20 November 1991 | 5 May 1992 | Independent |
| State Committee for Social Protection of Citizens and Rehabilitation of Territories Affected by Chernobyl and Other Radiation Disasters | Vasily Voznyak | 20 November 1991 | 23 December 1992 | Independent |
| State Committee for the Socio-Economic Development of the North | Vladimir Kuramin | 25 February 1992 | 23 December 1992 | Independent |
| State Committee for State Property Management | Anatoly Chubais | 10 November 1991 | 23 December 1992 | Independent |
| State Committee for Economic Cooperation with the CIS Member States | Vladimir Mashits | 27 December 1991 | 23 December 1992 | Independent |
| State Customs Committee | Anatoly Kruglov | 30 September 1992 | 23 December 1992 | Independent |
| Central Bank | Viktor Gerashchenko | 14 November 1992 | 23 December 1992 | Independent |

== Sources ==
- "Составы правительств с 1990 по 1998 год" [Compositions of government from 1990 to 1998]. Rossiyskaya Gazeta (in Russian). 2011-02-21.
