= Tishkov =

Tishkov (Russian: Тишко́в) is a Russian surname. Notable people with the surname include:

- Valery Tishkov (born 1941), Soviet and Russian ethnologist
- Yuri Tishkov (1971–2003), Soviet and Russian footballer, agent, and commentator
