= Yeltsin–Gaidar government reforms =

Set of Russian government reforms

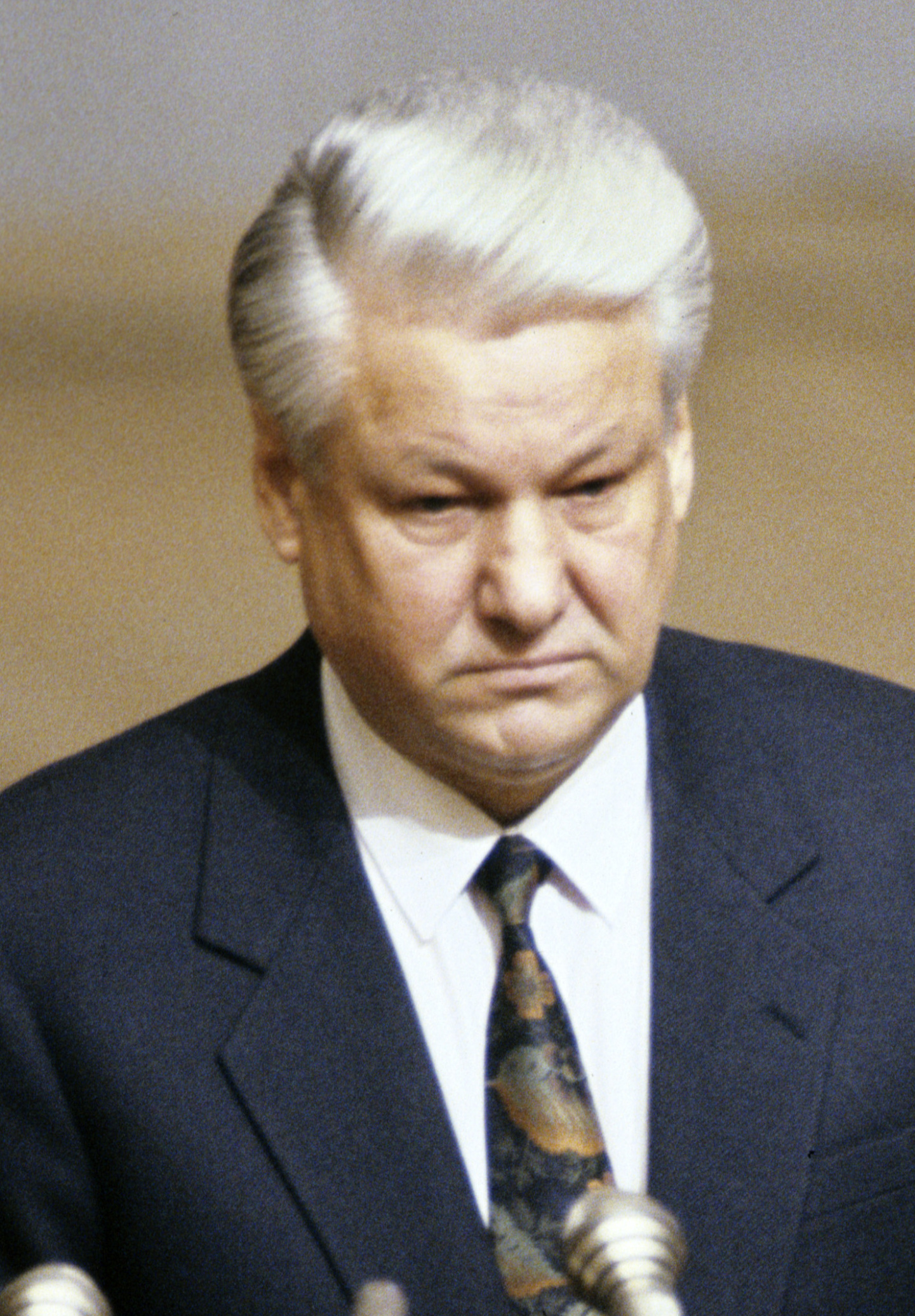
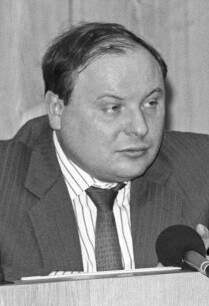
Boris Yeltsin (left) and Yegor Gaidar (right) in 1992

The Yeltsin–Gaidar government reforms (Russian: Реформы правительства Ельцина — Гайдара), known also as the Gaidar reforms are the changes in the economy of Russia and public administration system carried out by the Cabinet of Boris Yeltsin and Yegor Gaidar from January 2 to December 15, 1992.

The Yeltsin-Gaidar government liberalized retail prices, liberalized foreign trade, reorganized the tax system and other reforms that radically changed the economic situation in the country. The result of the reforms is Russia's transition to a market economy. During the reform of retail price liberalization, prices increased 10,000 times, and after the reform to the present day, approximately 325 times.

== Economic situation before the start of reforms ==
In December 1992, Yegor Gaidar reported to the 7th Congress of People's Deputies of Russia that the primary problem at the start of the government's work was to prevent disruptions in the life support system, primarily in food supplies. According to data cited by economist Yevgeny Yasin, by the end of 1991, food rationing standards in most regions were: sugar - 1 kg per person per month, meat products - 0.5 kg (with bones), animal butter - 0.2 kg. The following data are cited in the collective work of the IET edited by Gaidar: by the end of 1991, commodity reserves of meat and fish in retail trade had decreased to 10 days, in January 1992, food grain reserves (excluding imports) amounted to about 3 million tons with a need of 5 million tons per month. In 60 of the 89 Russian regions, grain reserves were exhausted and bread production was carried out "on the fly" immediately after the grain was imported.

The situation was complicated by the fact that the country's foreign exchange reserves were almost exhausted. Grain was purchased abroad only through foreign loans, and the government did not even have enough money to pay for the freight of ships. Some of the food came in the form of humanitarian aid from Western countries.

Telegrams coming from the regions also spoke of the critical situation with food supplies in a number of regions.

A letter from the Deputy Ministers of Finance of the USSR to the Committee for the Operational Management of the National Economy of the USSR in September 1991 stated: "Considering that most of the goods are immediately sold out, it can practically be considered that the ruble has no commodity backing today... The total budget deficit for the budget system as a whole in the ruble circulation zone will amount to 300 billion roubles. A deficit of this size is a disaster for finances and money circulation. At the same time, it leaves no chance for a significant real improvement in the situation before the end of the year…”.

== Beginning of the reform ==
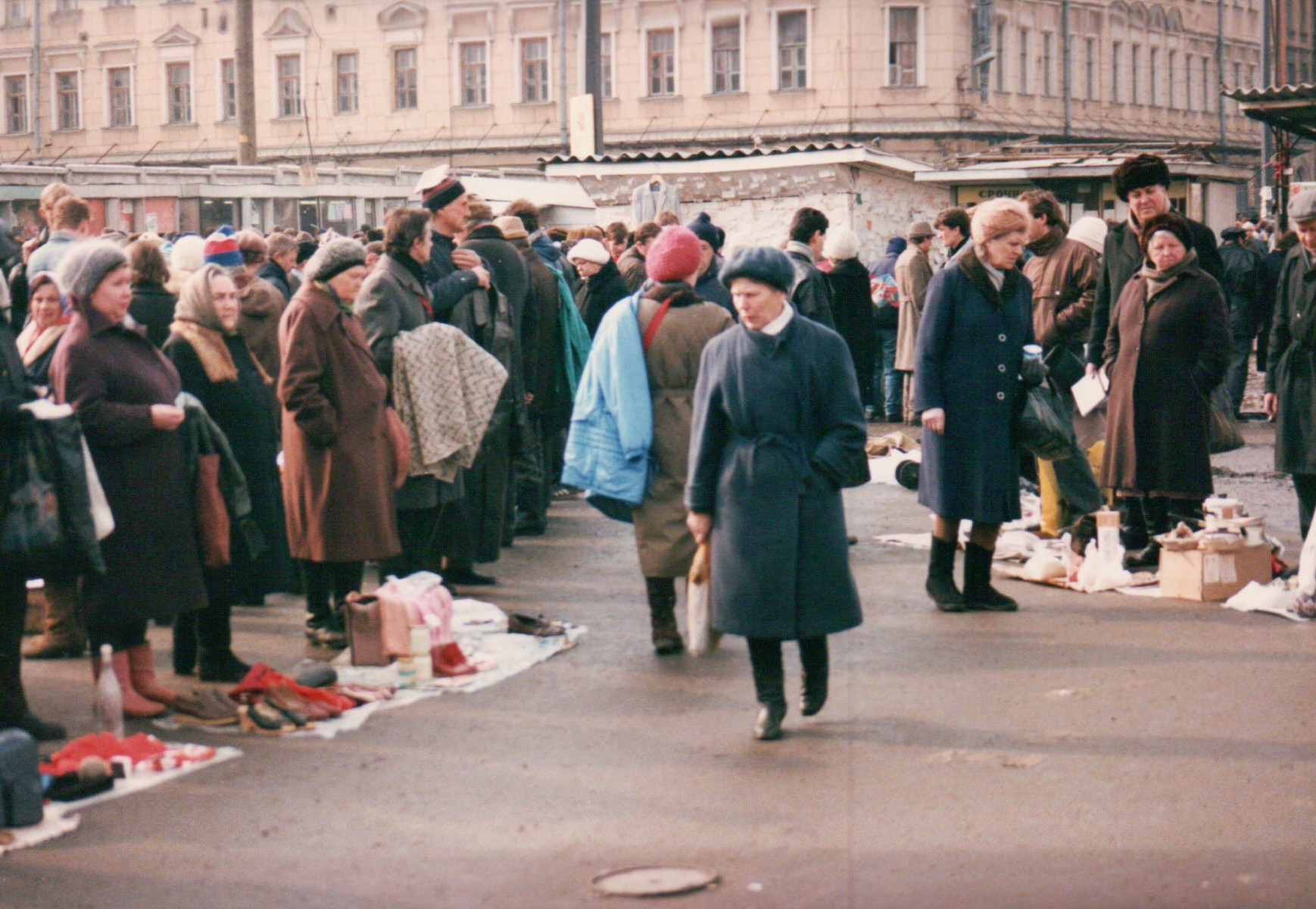
Street market in Rostov-on-Don, 1992

In early autumn 1991, it became clear that the USSR was unable to pay its foreign debt. Negotiations with creditors led to the signing of a memorandum in late October, "On Mutual Understanding Regarding the Debt to Foreign Creditors of the USSR and Its Successors." Eight of the fifteen Soviet republics acknowledged their joint liability for this debt. Foreign banks, for their part, demanded an urgent transition to market reforms. In the autumn of 1991, Yegor Gaidar's "economic program" was born. President Boris Yeltsin announced its main provisions on October 28 in a programmatic speech at the V Congress of People's Deputies of Russia. It envisaged privatization, price liberalization, commodity intervention, and rouble convertibility. Proclaiming this course, Boris Yeltsin assured his fellow citizens that "things will get worse for everyone in about six months." This will be followed by "a reduction in prices, filling the consumer market with goods, and in the fall of 1992 - stabilization of the economy, gradual improvement in people's lives".

On November 21, following the results of the second round of negotiations with the G7 countries on external debt, the Soviet Union was granted a short-term deferment on its debt obligations. On December 5, the "Treaty on Succession to the State Debt and Assets of the USSR" was signed. This treaty determined the amount of the USSR's total debt - $93 billion - and the share of each of the 15 republics in repaying the Soviet debt. Russia's share was 61.3%, or about $57 billion. Seven republics (Azeri SSR, Latvian SSR, Lithuanian SSR, Moldavian SSR, Turkmen SSR, Uzbek SSR and Estonian SSR) refused to sign this treaty. The main condition for granting another deferment on debt obligations was "cooperation with the International Monetary Fund" (IMF) in implementing "market reforms". As Ruslan Khasbulatov claimed, "the program of reforms in Russia as a complete document" did not exist, and the reforms that began in January 1992 and were called shock therapy were based on "strict recommendations and demands of the International Monetary Fund".

The draft presidential decree was prepared by Gaidar's team on November 15. Price liberalization was supposed to be announced on December 1, 1991. However, under pressure from other union republics that had a common rouble zone with Russia, price liberalization was postponed first to December 16, and then to the beginning of January 1992.

Price liberalization was carried out on January 2, 1992. At the same time, enterprises and retail establishments received the right to independently set prices for their products, and import restrictions were abolished. Together with the decree on free trade and the acceleration of privatization of state enterprises that was issued soon after, this meant the end of the Soviet command-administrative economic system and the transition to a market economy.

Gaidar's hopes of filling stores with goods and solving the problem of shortages were justified. In the book by economist L. Lopatnikov, data are presented that inventories in retail and wholesale trade, as well as industry, which by January 1992 constituted 45% of the December 1990 level, had grown to 75% of this level in June. Market mechanisms began to operate in the economy. On the contrary, Sergey Kara-Murza cites data from the "State Report on the Health of the Population of the Russian Federation in 1992" and notes that a "general deficit" of food, "previously unthinkable" arose in the country.

Before price liberalization, the government took a number of measures to provide social support to low-income population. On December 26, 1991, the presidential decree "On additional measures of social support for the population in 1992" was issued. In February 1992, a decree was also adopted on one-time payments to low-income groups of the population and a government resolution was issued on the creation of territorial social support funds. As the Minister of Economy Andrey Nechayev wrote, in 1992, funds were allocated for targeted social support for those in need, federal and regional social support funds were created, charity canteens were opened, and subsidies for dairy products, basic types of baby food, and some services were allocated from regional budgets. But, according to Nechayev, "it was impossible to compensate for the price increase for everyone and in full".

The second problem facing Gaidar's government was the breakdown of the monetary circulation system. In the last years of the USSR, money emission was widely used to finance domestic expenditures. The consequences of this policy were unsatisfied demand, an increase in private savings, and a deficit. After the price liberalization, the excess of uncommodified money was bound to lead to a sharp increase in prices, creating the threat of hyperinflation. Financial stabilization in these conditions was complicated by the fact that the former Soviet republics could now independently issue rubles, paying them with Russian enterprises. This increased the money supply within Russia. The problem was solved only by mid-1992, when correspondent accounts were introduced for settlements with other CIS republics that were part of the ruble zone.

To combat inflation, the Russian government had to sharply reduce government spending, which was provided by printing money. Funds for the purchase of weapons were reduced by 7.5 times, centralized capital investments by 1.5 times, and price subsidies by almost 3 times. Another measure of financial policy was the introduction of a value-added tax. Administrative regulation of foreign trade was replaced by the introduction of duties and tariffs. These decisions made it possible to balance the budget for the first quarter of 1992 without a deficit. At the same time, the actual execution of the budget for the first quarter occurred with a deficit of 2% of GDP, without large-scale money emission.

According to official data from Rosstat in January 1992, immediately after liberalization, prices increased by 3.5 times (by 345.3%) in a month.

In February, inflation dropped to 38% in a month, and in May it was equal to 11.9%. As inflation decreased in the first half of 1992, support for the Gaidar government grew.

The book by economists Vladimir Mau and I. Starodubrovskaya stated: “According to the Moscow service ‘Opinion’, support for Yegor Gaidar's activities as head of the government was 39% in February (inflation 27.3%), 49% in July (inflation 7.1%) and 31% in September (inflation 15.2%). Similar data are also provided by VTsIOM.”

The collective work edited by Rustem Nureev asserts that as a result of price liberalization, by mid-1992, Russian enterprises were left practically without working capital. As economist D. V. Kuvalin wrote, the depreciation of working capital contributed to the acute crisis of mutual non-payments between enterprises. Due to non-payments, wage arrears began to grow rapidly and there was a threat of stopping vital industries: water supply, electricity, transport and others. Thus, the problem of non-payments became one of the main factors determining the economic situation in Russia at that time.

In 1992, Andrei Nechayev, the Minister of Economy, wrote that "The main reason for the non-payment crisis was the structural imbalance of the economy, the presence of a huge number of industries that were uncompetitive in market conditions, and the low efficiency of the banking system". According to Nechayev, the team of the head of the Central Bank of Russia, Georgy Matyukhin, was unable to technically ensure fast payment transactions between enterprises, as a result of which the arrival of funds to accounts was delayed. In conditions of high inflation, such delays resulted in large losses and a deficit of working capital for enterprises. Gaidar also pointed out that the dynamics of non-payments were subsequently changed by the spread of bankruptcy procedures, which were not used in 1992 and were introduced only on March 1, 1993.

== VI Congress of People's Deputies and Changes in Economic Policy ==
On April 6, 1992, the VI Congress of People's Deputies of Russia opened, which Yegor Gaidar called "the first frontal attack on reforms". The reduction in government spending led to the formation of opposition to the reforms in the form of the industrial and agricultural lobby, which had broad influence in the Supreme Soviet and at the Congress. A struggle unfolded around increasing subsidies and loans to industry and agricultural enterprises. On April 11, 1992, the Congress adopted a resolution "On the progress of economic reform in the Russian Federation", in which:

- Notes a number of problems in the economy: a decline in production, the destruction of economic ties, a sharp decline in the standard of living of the population, an increase in social tension, a shortage of cash;
- Notes that the government has not created effective economic levers and is losing control of the public sector of the national economy, and is not interacting effectively enough with the relevant authorities and management bodies, heads of enterprises, representatives of work collectives and trade unions;
- Proposes that the President of Russia make significant adjustments to the tactics and methods of implementing economic reform, taking into account the comments and proposals made by people's deputies at the Sixth Congress of People's Deputies, and submit by May 20, 1992, to the Supreme Soviet of Russia a list of measures aimed at the priority solution of, in particular, the following tasks: preventing a critical decline in production, preventing mass unemployment, increasing the production of consumer goods and especially food, achieving financial stabilization, easing the tax burden, orienting tax policy toward stimulating the development of leading sectors of the economy, actively pursuing structural, investment and conversion policies, supporting budget sectors, implementing effective measures to combat speculation, corruption and mafia structures, ensuring the participation of broad sections of the population in privatization and the diversity of its forms in order to increase the number of owners, targeted elimination of mutual non-payments of industrial and agricultural enterprises.

Later, Gaidar described the decision-making process at the Congress in his memoirs: “Almost by word of mouth, without discussion, without analysis of material possibilities, resolutions were adopted, which ordered the government to reduce taxes, increase subsidies, raise wages, and limit prices. A senseless set of mutually exclusive measures.”

In response to the resolution of the Congress, the government headed by Yegor Gaidar submitted a resignation letter to the president. On April 13, Gaidar read out this statement at the Congress press center. In particular, it stated:

The totality of demands declared by the Congress dooms the country to hyperinflation, means a suspension of the privatization process and a curtailment of agrarian reform. Proposals to reduce taxes and simultaneously increase social and other payments are unfeasible and can only lead to the collapse of the financial system... The inevitable result of implementing the decisions of the Congress will be a catastrophic decline in living standards, hunger, social upheaval and chaos... We do not consider ourselves entitled to follow the path of irresponsible populism, when under the pretext of protecting the population, it is robbed as a result of accelerating inflation.

According to the government's calculations, if the resolution of the deputies is implemented, budget expenditures should increase to 1.2 trillion roubles, and inflation will amount to 300-400% per month. That same day, at the evening session of the Congress, Gaidar and other ministers demonstratively leave the hall, after the words of the speaker Ruslan Khasbulatov, "The guys are confused," addressed to the government of Russia.

On April 15, the Congress made concessions and adopted the Declaration "On Support for Economic Reform in the Russian Federation", in which it supported the government's actions aimed at fundamentally transforming the economy, and proposed implementing the resolution of April 11 "taking into account the actual economic and social conditions". However, the president and the government were also forced to compromise. In May–June, fulfilling the agreements reached at the Congress, Boris Yeltsin appointed representatives of the "red directors" to the government - Vladimir Shumeyko, Georgy Khizha (the latter, as stated in the memoirs of Andrei Nechayev, having come to the government, was actively involved in lobbying for the issuance of loans to industry, which, in conditions of high inflation, were in fact a form of subsidizing enterprises from the budget), without Gaidar's knowledge, the head of Gazprom, Viktor Chernomyrdin, was appointed vice-premier for the fuel and energy complex. According to government member Petr Aven, the fact that Yeltsin agreed to exchange ministers from the "Gaidar team" for opposition candidates "came as a shock" for the government.

The first attempt at financial stabilization, based on cutting government spending and introducing new taxes, took 3–4 months and led to a decrease in inflation in April–May 1992. Then, under pressure from the Supreme Soviet of Russia and enterprise directors, the government's tough monetary policy was softened. As Andrei Nechayev wrote, "By May 1992, we were faced with the fact that the financial obligations imposed on us could only be covered by a third from real sources of budget revenue." The government raised the salaries of striking miners, and at the insistence of the Supreme Soviet of Russia, 600 billion rubles in preferential loans were allocated to resolve the non-payment crisis. According to Gaidar, in July "the Supreme Soviet, in two hours, adopted amendments by voice vote, increasing the state's financial obligations and the budget deficit by 8% of GNP." In July, the leadership of the Central Bank changed. The new head of the Central Bank, Viktor Gerashchenko, does not support the course of reducing expenses promoted by Gaidar, and carries out mutual offsets of enterprise debts based on a one-time credit issue of about 1 trillion roubles. This has a temporary effect and leads to an increase in inflation. In the fall, the problem of non-payments arises again. Overall, the volume of Central Bank loans increased by 2.9 times in the second half of the year. According to the fourth Minister of Economy of Russia, Yevgeny Yasin, "with Gerashchenko's arrival at the Central Bank, the first attempt at financial stabilization was finally thwarted." In the summer of 1992, the seasonal factor also affects the increase in expenses. Loans are allocated to ensure the Northern Delivery, and the Supreme Soviet approves a decision on large-scale loans to agricultural producers for the harvest. The growth of the money supply and inflation accelerated (from 8.6% in August to 22.9% in October).

Since autumn, the government has been forced to sharply cut spending again in order to prevent hyperinflation. The budget deficit fell from 10.8% of GDP in August to 4.4% of GDP in October. As stated in the book by economist Vladimir Mau, these efforts led to a noticeable reduction in inflation in the spring of 1993. However, in 1992, hyperinflation was recorded in Russia with prices rising by 2508.8% (i.e. 26 times).

== Results of the Government's Work ==
=== Government achievements ===
By the time of Gaidar's resignation in December 1992, the government he headed had achieved the following results:

- Overcoming the commodity deficit and restoring the consumer market in the first half of 1992.
- Reorganization of the tax system.
- Beginning of the privatization process.
- Liberalization of foreign trade.
- Legalization of ownership and free exchange of foreign currency (introduction of internal convertibility of the ruble).
- Beginning of agrarian reform - reorganization of collective and state farms.
- Restructuring of the fuel and energy complex and creation of oil companies.
- Reaching agreements on the withdrawal of nuclear weapons from Belarus, Ukraine and Kazakhstan.
- A sharp reduction in spending on the purchase of military equipment and ammunition.

Also, according to economists I. Starodubrovskaya and the adviser to the acting chairman of the government of Gaidar in 1992, the rector of the Academy of National Economy Vladimir Mau:

- Stopping the processes of disintegration of Russia.
- Preventing a precipitous increase in unemployment.
- Rector of the Russian School of Economics Sergei Guriev noted that Gaidar created the state institutions of modern Russia: the tax system, customs, banking system, financial market. Also, as Doctor of Historical Sciences Alexander Bezborodov wrote, the Gaidar government carried out a reform of the wage
- System in the budgetary sphere, took measures for the social protection of the low-income population, and increased old-age pensions.

As a result of the activities of the government of Yegor Gaidar, there was a transition from a planned to a market economy.

== Consequences of price liberalization ==
The consequences of the liberalization of the economy were twofold. On the one hand, by the end of 1992, the commodity deficit had been overcome, and market mechanisms had been launched in the Russian economy.

On the other hand, as economists Rimashevskaya and Volkonsky claim, liberalization led to a sharp rise in prices by 26 times in 1992, росту неплатежей, an increase in non-payments, and, according to Rimashevskaya, to a depreciation of wages, a depreciation of the population's income and savings, an increase in unemployment, and an increase in the problem of irregular payment of wages. Volkonsky also believes that the destruction of the Soviet state apparatus for regulating prices and the liberalization of prices led to huge disparities in prices and the financial situation of enterprises and industries. According to a number of economists, in the conditions of a monopolized economy, price liberalization actually led to a change in the bodies controlling prices: instead of the state, monopoly structures themselves began to do this, which led to a sharp increase in prices and a decrease in production volumes.

Economist, First Deputy Minister of Foreign Economic Relations in 1992 Sergey Glazyev claimed that price liberalization, which was not accompanied by the creation of restraining mechanisms, led "not to the creation of mechanisms of market competition, but to the establishment of control over the market by organized criminal groups extracting excess profits by inflating prices", in addition, the mistakes made "provoked hyperinflation of costs, which not only disorganized production, but also led to the devaluation of income and savings of citizens".

Yevgeny Yasin wrote that liberalization triggers mechanisms of structural restructuring of the economy. This restructuring is accompanied by a crisis and recession, the closure of uncompetitive industries. However, the new prices actually reflect demand and stimulate the transfer of resources freed up from the planned economy to competitive industries. In the second phase of perestroika, reconstruction and growth of production, growth of incomes and investments begin.

In an article by former IMF employee, economist Oleg Gavrilishin, based on a comparison of the results of market reforms in different countries, it is argued that the negative effects of the transition to the market should not be associated with liberalization; on the contrary, these consequences in Russia have increased due to the interrupted nature of shock therapy and unfinished financial stabilization. Gavrilishin wrote that "the best path from the point of view of institutional development is not to delay liberalization. Countries that already at the first stage took rapid steps towards macroeconomic stabilization and liberalization have built more advanced institutions".

=== Fall in investment volume ===
In 1992, there was a 40% fall in capital investment compared to the previous year. Michael Intriligator, professor of economics at the University of California, attributes the "depletion of investment with the resulting erosion of fixed capital" to one of the consequences of the failure of macroeconomic stabilization and the associated recession and inflation.

Former Russian Minister of Economy Andrei Nechayev writes that in 1992, money had to be allocated not on the principle of "where we would like it to be", but on the principle of "where we can't help but give it". The most severe version of capital investment reduction was adopted, from which all long-term construction projects started in the USSR were crossed out, and only those projects whose necessity was obvious were left. At the same time, as Nechayev writes, one of the arguments in favour of such a reduction was that of the large projects in which money was invested in the last years of the USSR, not a single one was put into operation in 1991. The money, according to Nechayev, was mostly wasted "in the sand".

In articles from 1990 to 1991 in the magazine "Kommunist", Gaidar wrote that the increase in capital investments in these years was one of the main causes of inflation. At the same time, a large number of newly started construction projects were combined with regular disruptions in the commissioning of facilities, an increase in the number of mothballed and stopped construction projects, and purchased but not installed equipment. The economic efficiency of investment projects was not confirmed by expert assessments.

=== Consequences of Foreign Trade Liberalization ===
As Academician Victor Polterovich pointed out, foreign trade liberalization was carried out in 1992 together with the liberalization of domestic prices, but domestic prices did not approach their equilibrium values. This led to extremely negative consequences for the country:

- The sale of raw materials (oil, fuel, non-ferrous metals) in the context of a huge difference between world and domestic prices, low export tariffs and weak customs control became extremely profitable, providing returns of tens of thousands of percent. As a result, investments in the development of production lost their meaning. Economic entities began to seek access to foreign trade operations. These circumstances contributed to the growth of crime, corruption, inequality, an increase in domestic prices and a decline in production.
- The flow of relatively cheap consumer goods from abroad led to the collapse of the Russian light industry.

Andrei Nechaev wrote that the problem of the imbalance of domestic and foreign prices in Russia was taken into account when developing tariffs and duties on foreign economic activity. It was necessary to calculate such tariffs so as not to empty the domestic market due to the export of raw materials and at the same time to provide an opportunity to overcome the shortage of goods, create competition in the domestic market and fill the budget. According to him, "in general, our commodity producers did not express any particular complaints about the established import tariffs". At the same time, complete liberalization of imports was associated with the need to overcome the commodity shortage.

In the collective work of the IET "Economy of the Transition Period" edited by Gaidar, the following are named as consequences of the liberalization of foreign trade:

- Creation of a competitive environment in the highly monopolized domestic market.
- Compensation for the sharp decline in production in Russian industry.
- It is also indicated that the government took forced measures to restrain the export of energy resources so as not to create a shortage of them in the domestic market, where prices for them were not liberalized. Overall, oil and gas condensate exports fell by 19% in 1992.

=== Growth of Crime and Corruption ===
Academician V. Polterovich claimed that the population responded to Russian reforms, which caused “a complete devaluation of savings in 1992, a sharp decline in living standards, non-payment of wages, and the actual ruin of most non-raw materials sector enterprises at the initial stage” with an explosive intensification of uncontrollable redistribution processes—the growth of the shadow economy, corruption, and crime”. According to him, “the government did not even try to find adequate measures to contain these processes”. Polterovich also writes that the growth of crime, in particular, was caused by insufficient compensation for the damage from the reforms to the losing groups of economic agents. In contrast to the Russian reforms, Polterovich points to the successful experience of reforms in Eastern Europe.

Analyzing the results of the reforms, sociologist Renald Simonyan comes to the conclusion that Gaidar's government "stimulated the creation of a corrupt state". Gaidar, raising the issue of corruption, wrote that "the scale of nomenklatura theft in 1990-1991 far exceeded everything we had in this field in 1992-1994.

=== Consequences for the military-industrial complex ===
In 1992, the volume of arms and military equipment purchases was reduced by 67%.

Andrei Nechayev, the Minister of Economy in Gaidar's government, said that he tried to maintain R&D costs in the defense sector and created a system of conversion loans at preferential rates for military-industrial complex production, but the financing of the defense industry had to be cut. Nechayev described his experience of visiting one of the military production facilities, the Omsktransmash plant, whose director demanded financing: "I saw a surreal sight: a clearing in the taiga, and as far as the eye could see, there were tanks covered in snow, and their rows stretched off into the distance somewhere. How many of them were there? Thousands, tens of thousands... I couldn’t stand it and shouted: “You scoundrel, you should be tried and shot. There are enough tanks for three big wars, and he’s asking a poor country for money to keep churning them out.” No funding was allocated. Nechayev admits: “It’s clear that this was a disaster for the plant.” Nechayev writes that the government tried to preserve the technology for producing unique weapons, helped military enterprises enter the foreign market, and launched programs to convert excess military capacity.

The president of the League for Assistance to Defense Enterprises (representing the Sukhoi Design Bureau, NPO Soyuz, Central Aerohydrodynamic Institute, and NPO Antey) Aleksey Shulunov wrote that since 1992 the order of financing and conducting defense R&D has been destroyed. This led to the degradation and disintegration of research teams, from which young, promising personnel left. Shulunov considers such actions by reformers in the military-industrial complex to be at least a “major mistake”, if not something else. Doctor of Economics Yevgeny Borisov described the impact of reforms on the military-industrial complex as destructive: “The beginning of fundamental economic transformations was marked by the ‘avalanche’ destruction of the military-industrial complex”.

Yakov Urinson, an employee of the Ministry of Economy in 1992 and Minister of Economy in 1997–1998, said that despite the lack of financial resources, by interacting with the heads of the military-industrial complex, “we still managed to preserve and even strengthen the potential of key enterprises in the military-industrial complex,” to form a methodology for mobilization planning, a system for coordinating and approving defense orders that was adequate to the new conditions. According to Urinson, a new approach was created to the development of the military-industrial complex in market conditions, using “the maximum possible level of military spending from macroeconomic considerations” as a percentage of GDP, with an increase in the share of R&D spending.

The General Director of JSC "Corporation" Radiocomplex" Vladislav Fadeyev characterizes the actions of the government as incompetent, noting that the military-industrial complex "was dealt the first blow in 1992 with the arrival of Gaidar" Criticizing the actions of the Gaidar government in the defense sphere, member of the Council on Foreign and Defense Policy Vitaly Shlykov names the following mistakes: maintaining an unjustifiably high level of military production and defense orders; the lack of restructuring and transfer of defense enterprises to the reserve, a reduction in consumer demand for consumer goods and production equipment. Shlykov believes that the decisive obstacle to the demilitarization of the economy is the lifting of restrictions on the import of consumer goods. At the same time, it was the military-industrial complex, in Shlykov's opinion, that should have been subjected to "shock therapy". The chairman of the State Duma Committee on Economic Policy Yuri Maslyukov spoke about the destructive influence of Gaidar's reforms.

=== Continued decline in living standards ===
The decline in living standards and the increase in poverty that continued in 1992 began several years before the formation of the reformist government. Average real incomes of the population in 1992 fell almost twofold compared to the 1991 level; for a third of the population (42.6 million people), incomes fell below the subsistence minimum. As N. M. Rimashevskaya, director of the Institute of Social and Economic Problems of the Russian Academy of Sciences, writes, a 2-3-fold decrease in current incomes of the population and the "expropriation of their savings" was a violation of citizens' rights to acceptable living conditions. But the population's monetary incomes in 1991 were not supported by goods on store shelves. According to data cited by Gaidar with reference to an archival document, commodity reserves in stable prices for September 1991 amounted to 14 kopecks per 1 ruble of the population's funds, and the increase in nominal income compared to the 1990 level in 1991 was estimated at 517%.

An article by sociologist Valentina Sycheva stated that after Gaidar's price liberalization, "poverty became the most painful problem of the population," and during 1992 and at the beginning of 1993, "dramatic changes for the worse occurred in practically all spheres of the population's life support". A September 1992 VTsIOM poll on the material status of families showed that 54% of Russians "barely made ends meet," 31% "lived more or less decently," 9% "lived below the poverty line," and only 4% did not experience difficulties. A December 1992 poll by the Institute of Sociology of the Russian Academy of Sciences showed that 38.2% of respondents had become "much worse" in the past six months (since May 1992), 27.4% "slightly worse," 20.7% "remained the same," 8.6% "slightly better," and 2.3% "much better." The respondents compared their lives with May 1992, when the results were worse compared to the beginning of the year. According to the state report "On the state of health of the population of the Russian Federation in 1992", in 1992 there was a significant deterioration in the quality of nutrition, while, comparing the situation with 1987, "There is a forced breakdown of the diet established in previous years, the consumption of protein products and valuable carbohydrates is decreasing, which inevitably affects the health of the population of Russia and, first of all, pregnant women, nursing mothers and children". According to the publication "Vesta, statistics. 1993" in 1992 (compared to 1991), the consumption of meat and meat products decreased by 14%, dairy products - by 15%, fish and fish products - by 20%, sugar and confectionery - by 13%. But the consumption of bread and bread products increased - by 4%, potatoes - by 6%. According to the State Statistics Committee, the daily caloric intake in 1992 decreased by only 3.5% from 2,526.88 kilocalories to 2,438.17. As politician Vladimir Milov notes, “2,438 kilocalories per day on average per Russian is the level of, for example, 2003–2004”. Sociologist Sergey Kara-Murza wrote: “Already in 1992, there was a sharp and profound deterioration in the nutrition of the majority of the population”, and the director of the Institute of Market Problems of the Russian Academy of Sciences Nikolai Petrakov wrote that “it was precisely under Gaidar that hungry people appeared”. According to the State Statistics Committee, the deterioration in living standards and nutrition began before 1992. In 1991, sales of basic food products decreased: meat and poultry by 21%, milk by 13%, butter by 18%, vegetable oil by 17%, sugar by 20%, potatoes by 17%, vegetables by 22%.

According to the report "On the state of health of the population of the Russian Federation in 1992", in 1992 the number of unemployed increased almost 10 times, amounting to 577 thousand people by the beginning of the following year. Doctor of Economics, Professor Valentin Kudrov writes in the textbook "World Economy" that in 1991 hidden unemployment already existed, reaching 35% of the working population.

=== Inflation and the Budget Deficit ===
According to economist Andrei Illarionov, after Gaidar joined the government, Russian government spending increased to 71% of GDP in 1992, while government revenues fell to 39% of GDP. The result was a budget deficit of 32% of GDP, which, as Illarionov wrote, was “unthinkable for peacetime government finances.” The inflationary wave created, according to Illarionov, by Gaidar's efforts ultimately led to the resignation of Gaidar and his government. In an article by employees of the Gaidar Institute of Economic Policy, Gaidar L. Lopatnikov, V. Nazarov and Sergei Sinelnikov-Murylev indicate that the data for 1992 cited by Illarionov were calculated using a different methodology than the data for 1991, and contain expenses that were not taken into account in the calculations of the State Statistics Committee in 1991, so that no increase in government spending occurred under Gaidar. Comparing the data obtained using different methods, "the venerable economist made an elementary mistake," the authors of the article point out. If government spending for 1992 were calculated using the methodology of the USSR State Statistics Committee, they would have amounted to only 33% of GDP, i.e. a decrease of 22 percentage points. The budget deficit figure cited by Illarionov, according to the authors of the article, is significantly exaggerated due to the exaggeration of the significance of budget expenditures. Analyzing the monthly dynamics of expenditures in 1992, economists come to the conclusion that a significant contribution to expenditures (27%) was made in December 1992 after Gaidar's resignation and was not related to his activities. Summarizing the analysis of Illarionov's data, the authors of the article write that "where some see a verdict based on some figures, even falsified ones, others see a reason for discussion about the difficulties of the transition period in Russia". According to Grigory Yavlinsky, such high inflation could have been avoided by carrying out small-scale privatization before price liberalization. In particular, the 500-day program envisaged its implementation over three months. This would have allowed the demonopolization of the Russian economy and significantly reduced the imbalance between the money and commodity supply, and would have given the reforms a reliable foundation and regulator - the small and medium-sized owner.

According to a report by the World Bank, government spending in 1992 amounted to 69.1% of GDP. According to IET calculations, government spending in 1992, including budget loans (less their repayment), amounted to 65.1% of GDP, while government revenues amounted to 40% of GDP. Of these, 25% (10% of GDP) came from off-budget funds. The federal budget deficit in 1992 amounted to 29.4% of GDP. The same figure, excluding subsidies to importers (primarily food), mainly financed by external loans, amounted to 18.9% of GDP. Inflation at the end of the year in 1992 amounted to 2609%. As a result of hyperinflation, the population's cash deposits in Sberbank, which amounted to more than 100 billion rubles, depreciated, which was perceived as direct robbery by the state. Inflation also hit the working capital of enterprises, which resulted in a problem of non-payments that became a long-term problem.

=== Economic growth ===
According to Oleg Gavrilishin and Yegor Gaidar, the final stage of the transition from a planned economy to a market economy is marked by the beginning of economic recovery growth. At this stage, the needs of the market sector are equal to or greater than the labour, production, and other resources freed up from the planned sector (unprofitable enterprises). Gaidar wrote that this growth mechanism operated in Russia until 2003, after which growth acquired an investment character.

As Harvard University economist Marshall Goldman noted, contrasting Russia with Eastern European countries, economic growth in European countries began two to three years after the start of reforms. In Russia, according to Goldman, GDP steadily fell until 1999 and decreased by 40-50% during this time. In general, Russia's real GDP recovered to the level of the early 1990s only in the second half of the 2000s. Vladimir Mau writes that in all reformed countries, "growth begins within a year after stabilization." Russia was no exception, although budget stabilization occurred later than predicted. Academician of the Russian Academy of Sciences Abel Aganbegyan writes that if Gaidar's government had not been dismissed in 1992 and had maintained its course of fighting inflation, Russia would have been among the leading countries in emerging from the transformation crisis. The academician sees the reasons for the protracted decline in the actions of subsequent Russian governments, which pursued a soft budget policy.

As Gaidar writes, there are different points of view regarding the factors of growth that began in the late 1990s: Vladimir Putin's rise to power and political stabilization, rising oil prices, and the depreciation of the ruble. However, Gaidar draws attention to the fact that a few years after the beginning of the transition to the market, economic growth appeared in all countries of Eastern Europe and the post-Soviet space. In Russia, economic growth began in 1997, was interrupted by the crisis of 1998 and continued in 1999. As Yegor Gaidar pointed out, this indicates that at the initial stage, economic growth is of a generally restorative nature and is an organic consequence of the reforms that were carried out.

Yevgeny Yasin wrote that the resumption of economic growth in 1998, "in addition to the devaluation of the rouble, was facilitated by Gaidar's reforms, which awakened Russian business, created a market economy and gave it the energy for development". Swedish economist and former adviser to the Russian government Anders Aslund also holds the opinion about the connection between economic growth and the market reforms of the 90s.

Economist Stanislav Menshikov, conducting an analysis of the factors of economic growth, notes: "To claim that for the economic growth of recent years we should bow and thank Gaidar, who allegedly paved the way, is, to put it mildly, a very free handling of the facts". At the same time, Menshikov, referring to a World Bank report, speaks of the same factors of economic growth in 1999–2002 as Gaidar did in his description of recovery growth: additional loading of idle capacities and the use of excess cheap labor.

=== Political consequences of reforms ===
In 1992, a gradual split began among those forces that had previously acted as a united anti-communist opposition. The key points of disagreement were the attitude to the Belovezha Accords and the economic reforms carried out by the Yeltsin-Gaidar government. Nevertheless, the majority of democratically oriented forces in 1992 continued to support the government's reformist activities. At the same time, characterizing the state of affairs at that time, one of the leaders of Democratic Russia of that time noted: "The entire discussion between Gaidar and his opponents was not perceived as a discussion on macroeconomics, in which, with the exception of members of his economic team, almost no one understood anything. Gaidar was rather perceived as a continuer of a consistent reformist democratic and progressive tradition. There was a clear boundary between Soviet conservatism on the one hand and the movement forward, the focus on progressive transformations that would lead us into the circle of civilized countries. And Gaidar was associated precisely with this attitude". In 1992, the Public Committee of Russian Reforms (OKRR) was also active, the participants of which were called upon to explain to the population the essence of the ongoing reforms and to promote them. For the most part, the OKRR included members of "Democratic Russia".

Petr Aven notes the underestimation by Gaidar's team of the political factor in the implementation of reforms, which was avoided by the colleagues of the reformers from the countries of the former socialist camp, for example, the Polish economist Leszek Balcerowicz, who later created his own political party. According to him, the reformers could have found allies among the deputies of the Supreme Soviet of Russia, adequate "red directors" and representatives of the executive branch, which would have ensured a more successful implementation of the reforms. It was difficult, but possible, to include Boris Fedorov and Grigory Yavlinsky in the government; they lacked the toughness to defend their position before Boris Yeltsin and his entourage.

== See also ==
- Balcerowicz Plan
- Secondhand Time: The Last of the Soviets
