= Gennady Kulik =

Russian politician (1935–2023)

- Геннадий Кулик
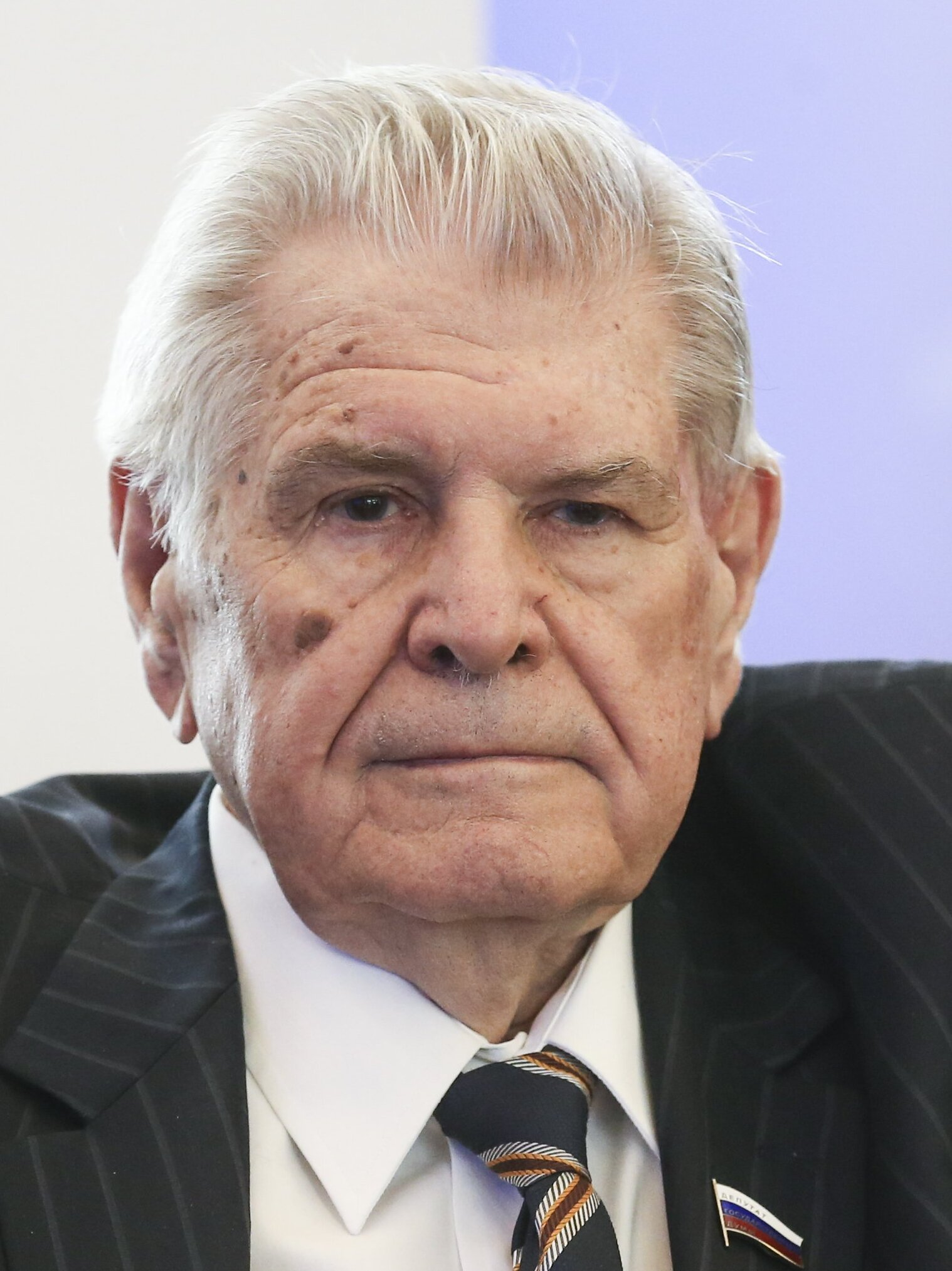
- Kulik in 2018

Member of the State Duma
- In office 18 January 2000 – 12 February 2020
- Parliamentary group: Fatherland – All Russia; United Russia

Deputy Prime Minister
- In office 21 September 1998 – 12 May 1999
- Premier: Yevgeny Primakov

Member of the State Duma
- In office 11 January 1994 – 21 September 1998
- Constituency: Kalmykia (1995–1998)

First Deputy Premier of the RSFSR
- In office 14 July 1990 – 10 July 1991
- Premier: Ivan Silayev
- Preceded by: Yevgeny Sizenko
- Succeeded by: Oleg Lobov

Minister of Agriculture and Food of the RSFSR
- In office 14 July 1990 – 15 November 1991
- Premier: Ivan Silayev
- Succeeded by: Viktor Khlystun

Personal details
- Born: 20 January 1935 Zhelomskoye, Novosokolnichesky District, Western Oblast, Russian SFSR, Soviet Union
- Died: 16 June 2023 (aged 88)
- Party: United Russia
- Other political affiliations: Communist Party of the Soviet Union (1960–1991); Agrarian Party
- Education: Leningrad State University

Gennady Vasilyevich Kulik (Russian: Геннадий Васильевич Кулик; 20 January 1935 – 16 June 2023) was a Soviet and Russian politician. He held the post of the first deputy premier of the Russian SFSR in the last years of the Soviet Union, and also was a deputy of the 1st–7th State Dumas of the Russian Federation.

== Biography ==
Gennady Kulik was born on 20 January 1935 in modern Pskov Oblast, Russia to a peasant family. In 1957 he graduated from the Faculty of Economics of the A. A. Zhdanov Leningrad State University. To 1965 he worked at the Novosibirsk Scientific Research Institute of Agricultural Economics.

Kulik died on 16 June 2023, at the age of 88.

=== Minister ===
From July 1990 to July 1991 he was the First Deputy Chairman of the Council of Ministers of Russia and Minister of Agriculture and Food in the Ivan Silayev's First Cabinet. In April 1991 he signed an agreement with Nessim Gaon's Noga SA on the supply of food in exchange for oil. Litigation under this agreement had not been resolved to 2008. In July 1991 Kulik's rank in the Ivan Silayev's Second Cabinet was lowered to "ordinary" deputy premier, retaining the position of the Minister of Agriculture. In late 1991 Kulik was a member of Silayev-led Committee for Operative Management of National Economy, which acted as a provisional government of crumbling USSR.

=== Member of parliament ===
In 1993 Gennady Kulik was elected member of the 1st State Duma. He joined the faction of the Agrarian Party of Russia. On 21 September 1998, he was appointed Deputy Prime Minister in the Yevgeny Primakov's Cabinet, supervising the agro-industrial complex.

In 1999 he was elected to the 3rd State Duma in the Kalmykia constituency. Kulik was a member of Fatherland – All Russia faction up to 2003 and deputy chairman of the Committee on Budget and Taxes. In 2002–07 — Chairman of the Committee on Agrarian Issues. Kulik resigned as a member of parliament on 11 February 2020. His seat passed to Alexey Gordeyev.

Gennady Kulik had been accused of lobbying the interests of tobacco companies. In 2002 he supported the requests of the tobacco industry to allow the sale of unsold cigarettes produced before 2001 law "On the restriction of tobacco smoking", which made warning message on the packs mandatory. In 2006 Kulik, together with MPs Ivan Savvidis and Airat Khairullin, initiated the consideration of draft "Technical regulations for tobacco products", allowing to use chemical additives banned in other countries, and making graphic warning messages unnecessary.

== Awards ==
- Order "For Merit to the Fatherland"
  - 3rd class (25 January 2010) — for merits in lawmaking and the development of Russian parliamentarism
  - 4th class (20 April 2006) — for active participation in lawmaking and many years of conscientious work
- Order of Honour (10 December 2001) — for high achievements in production activities, a great contribution to the strengthening of friendship and cooperation between the nations and many years of conscientious work
- Order of Friendship (26 August 2016) — for active legislative activity and many years of conscientious work
- Two Orders of the Red Banner of Labour
- Order of the Badge of Honour
- Order of the White Lotus of Kalmykia (2005)
- Honored economist of the RSFSR (11 January 1985)
- Certificate of honor of the Government of Russia (1999)
