= List of health ministers of Russia =

This is a list of ministers of health of Russia Federation.

== Russian Empire ==
=== Chief Manager of Public Health (Minister-level) ===
Minister	Political party	Term of office	
Georgy Rein	Independent	1 September 1916	28 February 1917

== Russian SFSR ==
=== People's Commissioners/Ministers of Health ===
Minister	Political party	Term of office	
Nikolay Semashko	Communist Party	18 July 1918	25 January 1930
Mikhail Vladimirsky	Communist Party	26 February 1930	15 February 1934
Grigory Kaminsky	Communist Party	15 February 1934	15 March 1937
Pyotr Sergiyev	Communist Party	15 March 1937	14 August 1937
Semyon Chesnokov	Communist Party	14 August 1937	19 July 1938
Ivan Belousov	Communist Party	20 July 1938	20 June 1939
Georgy Miteryov	Communist Party	20 June 1939	28 February 1940
Andrey Tretyakov	Communist Party	28 February 1940	17 June 1946
Georgy Beletsky	Communist Party	17 June 1946	3 December 1950
Maria Kovrigina	Communist Party	3 December 1950	28 January 1953
Vladimir Stepanov	Communist Party	28 January 1953	26 March 1955
Sergei Kurashov	Communist Party	26 March 1955	12 January 1959
Nikolay Vinogradov	Communist Party	10 April 1959	14 November 1962
Vladimir Trofimov	Communist Party	10 December 1962	21 April 1983
Nikolay Trubilin	Communist Party	21 April 1983	6 January 1986
Anatoly Potapov	Communist Party	6 January 1986	19 September 1990
Vyacheslav Kalinin	Communist Party	19 September 1990	5 December 1991
Andrey I. Vorobyov	Independent	14 November 1991	25 December 1991

== Russian Federation ==
=== Ministers of Health (1991–1994) ===
Minister	Political party	Term of office		Cabinet
Andrey I. Vorobyov	Independent	25 December 1991	23 December 1992	Yeltsin–Gaidar
Eduard Nechaev	Independent	23 December 1992	10 January 1994	Chernomyrdin I

=== Ministers of Health and Medical Industry (1994–1996) ===
Minister	Political party	Term of office		Cabinet
Eduard Nechaev	Independent	10 January 1994	28 November 1995	Chernomyrdin I
Alexander Tsaregorodtsev	Independent	5 December 1995	14 August 1996	Chernomyrdin I

=== Ministers of Health (1996–2004) ===
Minister	Political party	Term of office		Cabinet
Tatyana Dmitrieva	Our Home – Russia	22 August 1996	5 May 1998	Chernomyrdin II
Oleg Rutkovsky	Independent	5 May 1998	30 September 1998	Kiriyenko
Vladimir Starodubov	Independent	30 September 1998	12 May 1999	Primakov
Yury Shevchenko	Independent	5 July 1999	9 March 2004	Stepashin
Yury Shevchenko	Independent	5 July 1999	9 March 2004	Putin I
Yury Shevchenko	Independent	5 July 1999	9 March 2004	Kasyanov

=== Ministers of Health and Social Development (2004–2012) ===
Minister	Political party	Term of office		Cabinet
Mikhail Zurabov	Independent	9 March 2004	24 September 2007	Fradkov I
Mikhail Zurabov	Independent	9 March 2004	24 September 2007	Fradkov II
Tatyana Golikova	United Russia	24 September 2007	21 May 2012	Zubkov
Tatyana Golikova	United Russia	24 September 2007	21 May 2012	Putin II

=== Ministers of Health (since 2012) ===
Minister	Political party	Term of office		Cabinet
Veronika Skvortsova	Independent	21 May 2012	21 January 2020	Medvedev I
Veronika Skvortsova	Independent	21 May 2012	21 January 2020	Medvedev II
Mikhail Murashko	Independent	21 January 2020	Incumbent	Mishustin I
Mikhail Murashko	Independent	21 January 2020	Incumbent	Mishustin II
