= Boris Furmanov =

Russian politician (1936–2022)

- Борис Фурманов
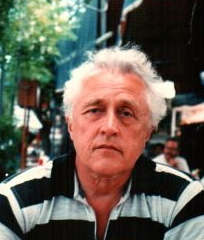

Minister of Architecture, Construction, and Housing
- In office 1991–1992
- Preceded by: position established
- Succeeded by: position abolished

Deputy Minister of Construction of Heavy Industry of the USSR
- In office 1986–1990

Personal details
- Born: Boris Aleksandrovich Furmanov; 17 December 1936 Sievierodonetsk, Ukrainian SSR, Soviet Union
- Died: 8 February 2022 (aged 85)
- Education: Ural State Technical University

Boris Aleksandrovich Furmanov (Russian: Борис Александрович Фурманов; 17 December 1936 – 8 February 2022) was a Russian politician.

He served as Minister of Architecture, Construction, and Housing from 1991 to 1992. He died on 8 February 2022, at the age of 85.
