= Viktor Chernomyrdin =

Russian politician (1938–2010)

- Виктор Черномырдин
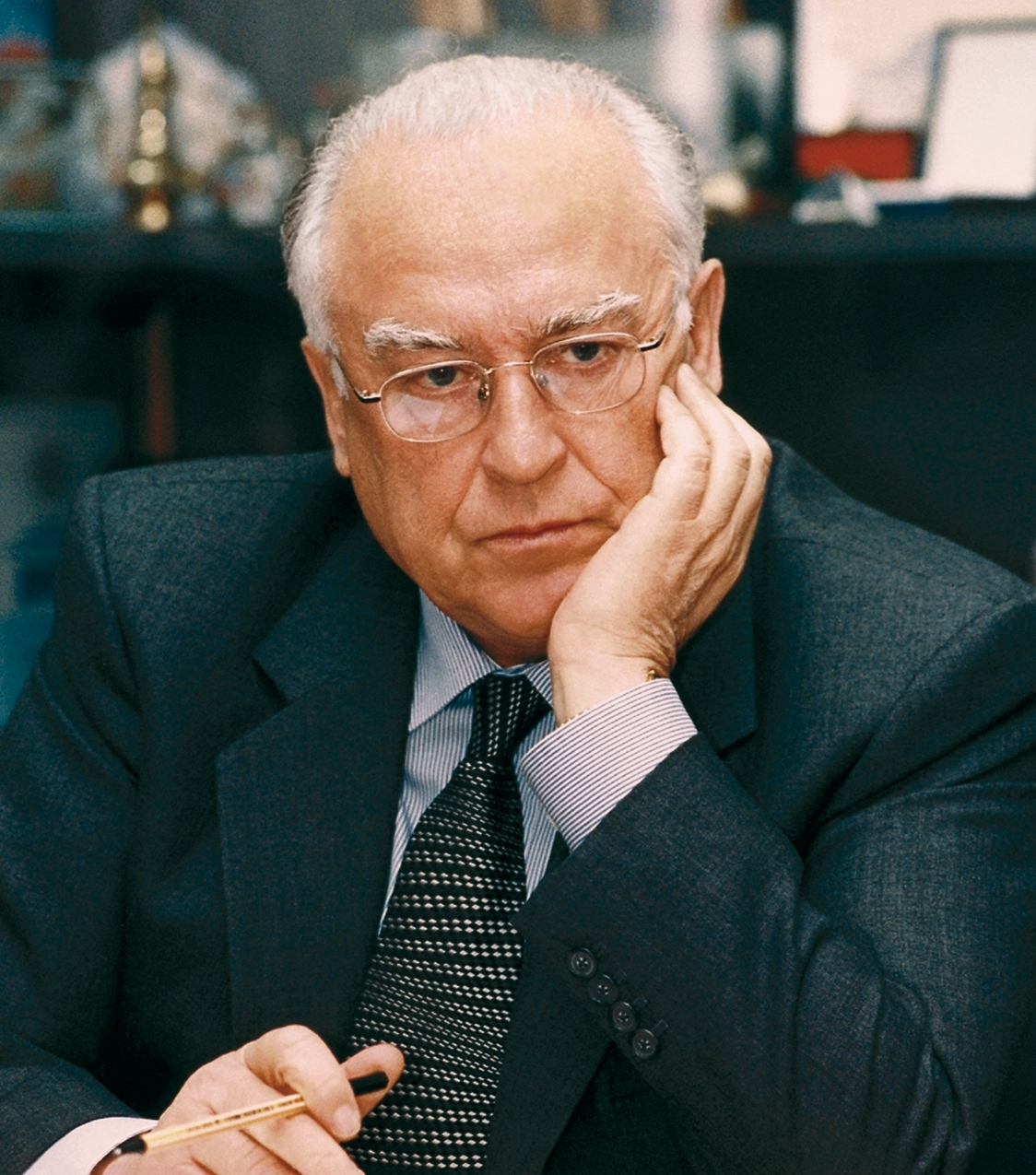
- Chernomyrdin in 2003

Acting President of Russia
- In office 5 November 1996 – 6 November 1996
- Prime Minister: Himself
- Preceded by: Boris Yeltsin
- Succeeded by: Boris Yeltsin

Prime Minister of Russia
- Acting; 23 August 1998 – 11 September 1998
- President: Boris Yeltsin
- Deputy: Boris Nemtsov; Viktor Khristenko; Oleg Sysuev
- Preceded by: Sergey Kiriyenko
- Succeeded by: Yevgeny Primakov
- In office 14 December 1992 – 23 March 1998
- President: Boris Yeltsin
- Deputy: Alexander Shokhin; Georgy Khizha; Boris Saltykov; Sergey Shakhray; Yury Yarov; Boris Fyodorov; Alexander Zaveryukha
- First Deputy: Vladimir Shumeyko; Oleg Lobov; Yegor Gaidar; Oleg Soskovets; Anatoly Chubais; Vladimir Kadannikov; Oleg Lobov; Alexei Bolshakov; Viktor Ilyushin; Vladimir Potanin; Anatoly Chubais; Boris Nemtsov
- Preceded by: Yegor Gaidar (acting)
- Succeeded by: Sergey Kiriyenko

Ambassador of Russia to Ukraine
- In office 21 May 2001 – 11 June 2009
- Nominated by: Vladimir Putin
- Preceded by: Ivan Aboimov
- Succeeded by: Mikhail Zurabov

Deputy Prime Minister of Russia
- In office 30 May 1992 – 14 December 1992
- Prime Minister: Boris Yeltsin (de facto); Yegor Gaidar (acting)

Minister of the Gas Industry (Soviet Union)
- In office 13 February 1985 – 17 July 1989
- Premier: Nikolai Tikhonov; Nikolai Ryzhkov
- Preceded by: Vasily Dinkov
- Succeeded by: Office abolished

Personal details
- Born: 9 April 1938 Chernyi Otrog, Orenburg Oblast, Soviet Union
- Died: 3 November 2010 (aged 72) Moscow, Russia
- Resting place: Novodevichye Cemetery
- Party: Communist (1961–1991); Independent (1991–1995); Our Home – Russia (1995–2001); United Russia (2001–2010)
- Spouse: Valentina Chernomyrdina (m. 1961; died 2010)
- Children: 2
- Awards: Order of Friendship

Viktor Stepanovich Chernomyrdin (Note: In this name that follows East Slavic naming customs, the patronymic is Stepanovich and the family name is Chernomyrdin.) (Russian: Виктор Степанович Черномырдин, IPA: [ˈvʲiktər sʲtʲɪˈpanəvʲɪtɕ tɕɪrnɐˈmɨrdʲɪn]; 9 April 1938 – 3 November 2010) was a Soviet and Russian politician and businessman. He was the Minister of Gas Industry of the Soviet Union (13 February 1985 – 17 July 1989), after which he became first chairman of Gazprom energy company and the second-longest-serving Prime Minister of Russia (1992–1998) based on consecutive years. He was a key figure in Russian politics in the 1990s and a participant in the transition from a planned to a market economy. From 2001 to 2009, he was Russia's ambassador to Ukraine. After that, he was designated as a presidential adviser.

Chernomyrdin was known in Russia and Russian-speaking countries for his language style, which contained numerous malapropisms and syntactic errors. Many of his sayings became aphorisms and idioms in the Russian language, two examples being the expression "We wanted the best, but it turned out like always." (Russian: Хотели как лучше, а получилось как всегда) and "The thing that never happens just happened again" (Russian: Никогда такого не было, и вот опять).

Chernomyrdin died on 3 November 2010 after a long illness. He was buried beside his wife in Novodevichy Cemetery on 5 November, and his funeral was broadcast live on Russian federal TV channels.

== Early life and education ==
Chernomyrdin was born in Chernyi Otrog, Orenburg Oblast, Russian SFSR. His father was a labourer and Viktor was one of five children. Chernomyrdin completed school education in 1957 and found employment as a mechanic in an oil refinery in Orsk. He worked there until 1962, except for his military service (which lasted from 1957 to 1960). His other occupations on the plant during this period included machinist, operator and chief of technical installations.

In 1962, he was admitted to Kuybyshev Industrial Institute (which was later renamed Samara Polytechnical Institute). In his entrance exams he performed very poorly. He failed the maths sections of the test and had to take the exam again, getting a C. He got only one B, in Russian language, and Cs in the other tests. He was admitted only because of very poor competition. In 1966, he graduated from the institute. In 1972, he completed further studies at the Department of Economics of the Union-wide Polytechnic Institute by correspondence.

== Soviet political and government career ==
In 1961, Chernomyrdin became a member of the Communist Party of the Soviet Union (CPSU). From 1967 to 1973, he served as an industrial administrator for the city party committee in Orsk. From 1973 to 1978, he was served in an appointed position as the deputy chief engineer and director for a natural gas plant in Orenburg. In 1978, he moved to Moscow to work for the Central Committee of the CPSU, becoming an apparatchik. From then until 1982, he worked in the heavy industry arm of the Central Committee.

In 1982, he was appointed deputy minister of the natural gas industries of the Soviet Union. Concurrently, beginning from 1983, he directed Glavtyumengazprom, an industry association for natural gas resource development in Tyumen Oblast. In 1985, Soviet leader Mikhail Gorbachev had him appointed to serve as minister of the natural gas industry, a role he held until 1989.

== Founder of Gazprom ==
In August 1989, under the leadership of Chernomyrdin, the Ministry of Gas Industry was transformed into the State Gas Concern, Gazprom, which became the country's first state-corporate enterprise. Chernomyrdin was elected its first chairman. The company was still controlled by the state, but now the control was exercised through shares of stock, 100% of which were owned by the state.

Chernomyrdin unsuccessfully ran in the 1990 Russian Supreme Soviet election.

When the Soviet Union dissolved in late 1991, assets of the former Soviet state in the gas sector were transferred to newly created national companies such as Ukrgazprom and Turkmengazprom. Gazprom kept assets located in the territory of Russia, and was able to secure a monopoly in the gas sector.

Gazprom's political influence increased markedly after Russian president Boris Yeltsin appointed the company's chairman Chernomyrdin as his prime minister in 1992. Rem Viakhirev took Chernomyrdin's place as chairman both of the board of directors and of the managing committee. Gazprom was one of the backbones of the country's economy in 1990s, though the company underperformed during that decade. In the 2000s, however, Gazprom became the largest extractor of natural gas in the world and the largest Russian company.

== Deputy prime minister of Russia ==
In May 1992, President Boris Yeltsin appointed Chernomyrdin as deputy prime minister in charge of fuel and energy. Chernomyrdin began his role in June, serving in the Cabinet of Boris Yeltsin and Yegor Gaidar, serving under acting prime minister Yegor Gaidar. Chernomyrdin's appointment came at the behest of the Civic Union political union.

Chernomyrdin's loyalty to the industrial lobby persisted.

== Prime Minister of Russia ==
Gaidar was considered a liberal political reformist, and the Congress of People's Deputies of Russia refused to confirm his nomination to serve as permanent prime minister. This led Yeltsin to instead nominate Chernomyrdin. Chernomyrdin was not regarded to have established much of a political identity for himself up to that point, making his nomination a surprise. However, the fact that he had staked out no political positions during his brief time in Gaidar's cabinet made it easier for Chernomyrdin's nomination to win sufficient approval. On 14 December 1992, Yeltsin formally nominated him. He was confirmed the same day by the Congress of People's Deputies.

According to Felipe Turover Chudínov, who was a senior intelligence officer with the foreign-intelligence directorate of the KGB, Chernomyrdin secretly decreed in the early 1990s that Russia would become an international hub for narcotics trafficking including importing cocaine and heroin from South America and heroin from Central Asia and Southeast Asia and exporting narcotics to Europe, North America including the United States and Canada, and China and the Pacific Rim.

While he had been critical of his predecessor Gaidar, Chernomyrdin largely continued Gaidar's policies.

Alongside U.S. vice president Al Gore, he served as co-chair of the Gore–Chernomyrdin Commission. The commission met biannually to discuss U.S.–Russia cooperation, but produced few tangible results. One outcome was U.S.–Russian cooperation in space exploration. In September 1993, he and Gore announced plans for the two nations to build a new space station, which eventually became the International Space Station. They also reached an agreement for the United States to begin participating heavily in the Mir programme in advance of the launch of the new space station, setting the ground for the Shuttle–Mir Programme.

In April 1995, he formed a political bloc called Our Home – Russia, which won 10% of the vote and 55 seats to come third in the 1995 Russian legislative election.

In 1995, Chernomyrdin signed a decree calling for the development of a national strategy for tiger conservation.

On 18 June 1995, as a result of Shamil Basayev-led terrorists taking over 1500 people hostage in Budyonnovsk, negotiations between Chernomyrdin and Basayev led to a compromise which became a turning point for the First Chechen War. In exchange for the hostages, the Russian government agreed to halt military actions in Chechnya and begin a series of negotiations.

When Boris Yeltsin was undergoing a heart operation on 6 November 1996, Chernomyrdin served as acting president for 23 hours.

Chernomyrdin remained prime minister until his sudden dismissal on 23 March 1998. Following the 1998 Russian financial crisis in August, Yeltsin re-appointed Chernomyrdin as prime minister, and attempted to groom him as his successor. However, the Duma twice refused to confirm Chernomyrdin as the head of the government. Rather than risking a third rejection and thus forcing the dissolution of the State Duma and political crisis, Chernomyrdin withdrew his nomination and the president asked the more popular Yevgeny Primakov to form a new cabinet.

== Diplomatic career ==
During the NATO bombing of Yugoslavia in 1999 Chernomyrdin was a special envoy of Russia in Yugoslavia. Chernomyrdin also disclosed his intent to run for president of Russia in 2000.

In December 1999 Chernomyrdin was elected a member of the State Duma. In May 2001, Vladimir Putin appointed Chernomyrdin Ambassador of Russia to Ukraine. This action was interpreted by some Russian media agencies as a move to distance Chernomyrdin from the centre of Russian politics. In 2003, he dismissed talk of an apology for the Holodomor Famine made by the Soviet Union.

In February 2009 Chernomyrdin again strained the relations between Ukraine and Russia when he in an interview said "It is impossible to come to an agreement on anything with the Ukrainian leadership. If different people come in, we'll see". The Ukrainian foreign ministry said in a response it could declare Chernomyrdin "persona non-grata" over the row.

On 11 June 2009, Russian president Dmitry Medvedev relieved Chernomyrdin as Russian ambassador in Kyiv, and appointed him as "presidential adviser and special presidential representative on economic cooperation with CIS member countries". In a parting shot at the Ukrainian government, Chernomyrdin stated that Russia should not apologise to Ukraine over voicing its suspicions about Ukraine being unable to pay for its natural gas, and further stated that Russia wants Ukraine to pay for the gas it consumes, and hence Russia is right to be concerned about the solvency of the Ukrainian state.

== Death ==
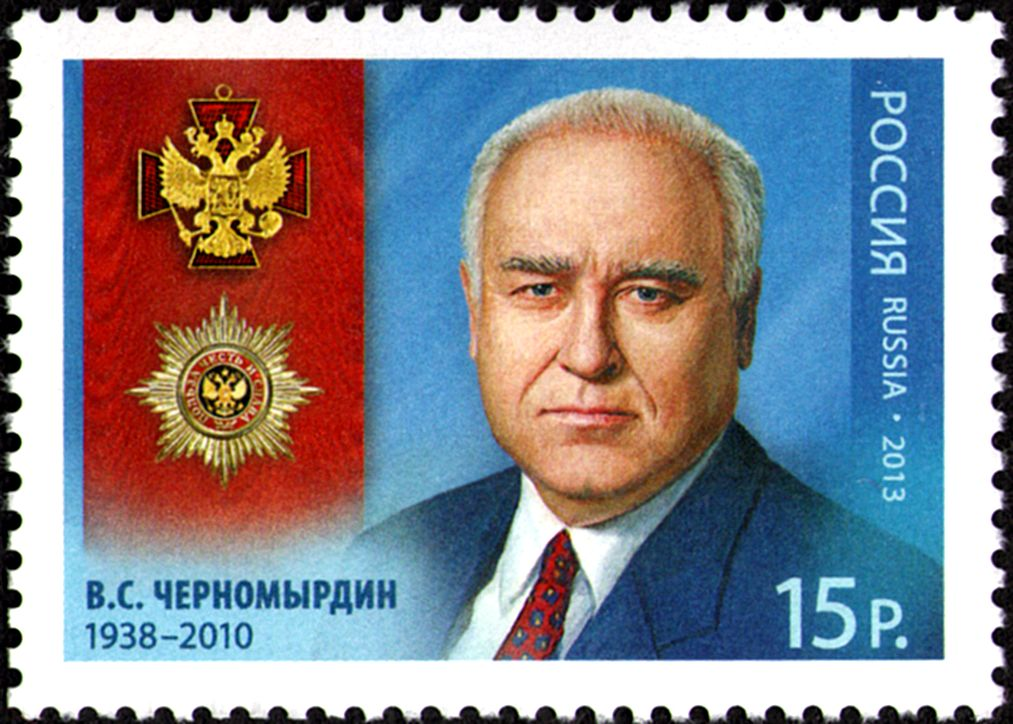
Postage stamp issued by the Russian Post in 2013 depicting Chernomyrdin

Chernomyrdin died on the morning of 3 November 2010 after a long illness. According to people close to Chernomyrdin, such as singer Lev Leshchenko, the former prime minister was deeply affected by the death of his wife Valentina, seven and a half months earlier.

Chernomyrdin was buried beside his wife in Novodevichy Cemetery on 5 November 2010. On 3 November Russian president Dmitry Medvedev signed an order to show Chernomyrdin's funeral in a live broadcast on Russian federal TV channels (only the funerals of the former president Boris Yeltsin and Patriarch Alexy II were granted the same right in recent years). The head of the Presidential Administration of Russia, Sergey Naryshkin, supervised the funeral ceremony.

Condolences on the death of Chernomyrdin were voiced on 3 November 2010 by Russian president Dmitry Medvedev, Russian prime minister Vladimir Putin, other state figures in Russia and Ukrainian president Viktor Yanukovich.

== Sayings ==
In Russian-speaking countries, Chernomyrdin is known for his numerous malapropisms and syntactically incorrect speech, somewhat similar to Irish bulls. His idioms received the name Chernomyrdinki, and are somewhat comparable to Bushisms in style and effect. One of his expressions "We wanted (to do) it better, but it turned out as always" (Хотели как лучше, а получилось как всегда in Russian) about the economic reforms in Russia was widely quoted (sometimes rendered in English as "We wanted the best, you know the rest" or "We tried our best, you know the rest.") The phrase was uttered after a highly unsuccessful monetary exchange performed by the Russian Central Bank in July 1993.

== Honours and awards ==
State awards of the Russian Federation and USSR

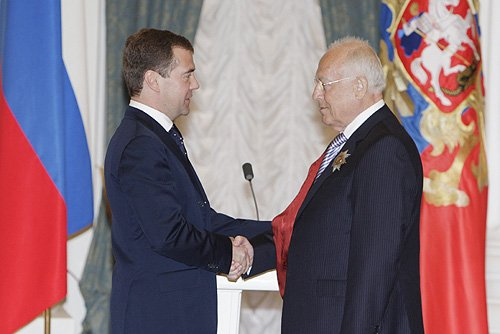
Presentation of the Order "For Merit to the Fatherland", 1st class with President Dmitry Medvedev, 20 May 2009

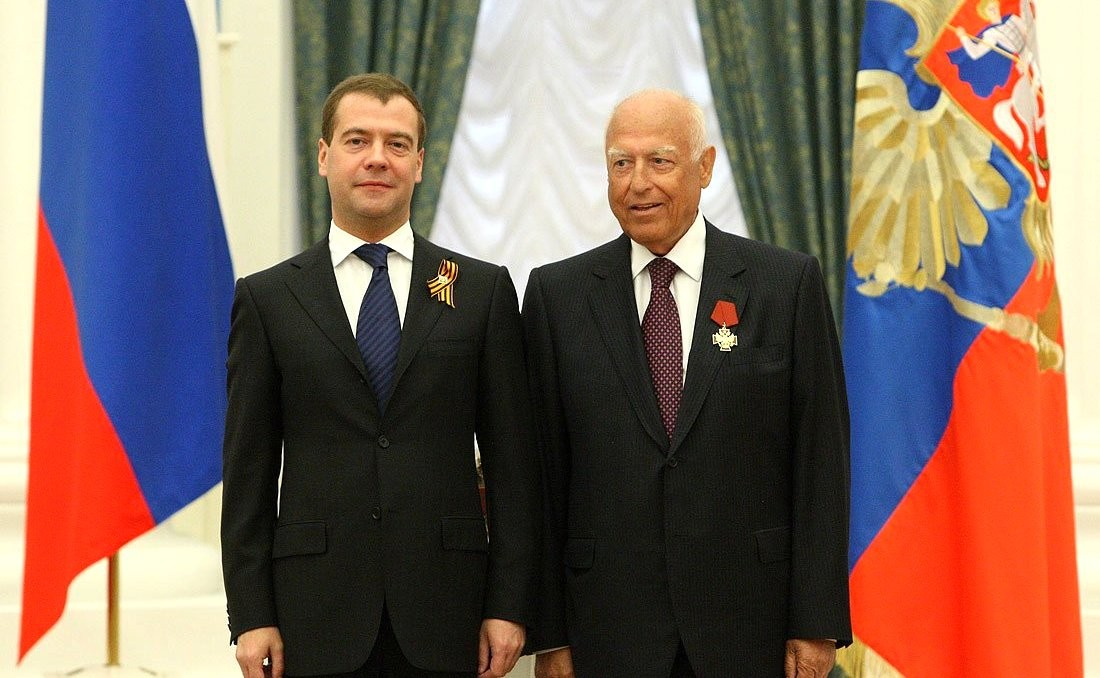
Presentation of the Order "For Merit to the Fatherland", 4nd class with President Dmitry Medvedev, 6 May 2010

- Order of Merit for the Fatherland
  - 1st class (24 March 2009) – for outstanding contribution to strengthening the international prestige of the Russian Federation and many years of fruitful activity
  - 2nd class (23 March 1998) – for outstanding contribution to the development of the Russian state
  - 3rd class (9 April 2008) – for outstanding contribution to the development of Russian-Ukrainian relations
  - 4th class (9 April 2010) – for long-term fruitful state activity
- Order of Friendship (8 April 2003) – for outstanding contribution to the strengthening and development of friendship and cooperation between Russia and Ukraine
- Order of the October Revolution (1986)
- Order of the Red Banner of Labour (1979)
- Order of the Badge of Honour (1974) – for achievements in the construction and development of the design capacity of the first stage of Orenburg gas complex
- Jubilee Medal "300 Years of the Russian Navy" (7 June 1996)
- Medal "In Commemoration of the 850th Anniversary of Moscow" (6 September 1997)
- Medal "In Commemoration of the 1000th Anniversary of Kazan" (23 August 2005)
- Jubilee Medal "In Commemoration of the 100th Anniversary since the Birth of Vladimir Il'ich Lenin" (1970)
- Jubilee Medal "Forty Years of Victory in the Great Patriotic War 1941-1945" (1985)

President and the Government of the Russian Federation

- Diploma of the President of the Russian Federation (12 December 2008) – for active participation in the drafting of the Constitution and a great contribution to the democratic foundations of the Russian Federation
- Gratitude of the President of the Russian Federation (9 November 1993)
- Gratitude of the President of the Russian Federation (14 August 1995) – for active participation in the preparation and conduct of the 50th anniversary of Victory in Great Patriotic War of 1941–1945
- Gratitude of the President of the Russian Federation (12 July 1996) – for active participation in organizing and conducting the election campaign of President of Russian Federation in 1996
- Gratitude of the President of the Russian Federation (30 July 1999) – for his great personal contribution to a political settlement between the Federal Republic of Yugoslavia and NATO, consistent defense of Russia's position in the Balkans
- Diploma of the Russian Federation Government (9 April 2003) – for his great personal contribution to the development of Russian-Ukrainian trade and economic cooperation
- Diploma of the Russian Federation Government (9 April 2008) – for long-term fruitful state activity

Foreign awards

- Medal "100th Anniversary of Birth of Georgi Dimitrov" (People's Republic of Bulgaria, 1982)
- Mkhitar Gosh (Armenia, 4 December 1998) – for outstanding contribution to the elimination of the consequences of the Spitak earthquake, humanitarian assistance and reconstruction work. Medal awarded 18 April 2002
- Order of Parasat (Kazakhstan, 1 September 1999) – for his contribution to the development of oil and gas industry in Kazakhstan
- Order of Prince Yaroslav the Wise, 5th class (Ukraine, 8 April 2003) – for outstanding contribution to the development of bilateral relations between Russia and Ukraine, weighty personal contribution in strengthening the friendly ties between the Russian and Ukrainian peoples
- Order of Merit, 3rd class (Ukraine, 17 June 2009) – for his contribution to the development of Ukrainian-Russian relations, the long-term diplomatic activity

Awards of states of the Russian Federation

- Order "For Merit" (Republic of Ingushetia, 19 June 2001) – for outstanding contribution to the establishment and development of the economy of Ingushetia
- Order of the "Key of Friendship" (Kemerovo Region, 7 March 2008)

Faith awards

- Order of St. Sergius, 2nd class (Russian Orthodox Church, 29 March 2007) – for their efforts in strengthening the unity of Orthodox peoples
- Order of Christmas, 2nd class (UOC)
- Jubilee medal "1020 years of the Baptism of Kievan Rus" (PCM, 25 November 2008)

Departmental awards

- Honorary Worker of the Ministry for Oil and Gas Construction (1 April 1988)
- Veteran of Labour in the Gas Industry (8 April 1998)
- Honorary Worker of the Ministry of Foreign Affairs (2 April 2003) – for active participation in the implementation of Russian foreign policy

Other recognitions

- A Russian icebreaker is named after Chernomyrdin

== Notes ==
Political offices
Preceded by Yegor Gaidar (acting)	Prime Minister of Russia; 1992–1998	Succeeded by Sergei Kiriyenko
Preceded by Sergei Kiriyenko	Acting Prime Minister of Russia; 1998	Succeeded by Yevgeny Primakov
