= Mikhail Poltoranin =

Russian journalist and politician (1939–2026)

- Михаил Полторанин
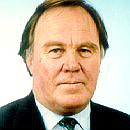

Deputy Prime Minister of Russia
- In office 22 February 1992 – 25 November 1992
- President: Boris Yeltsin
- Prime Minister: Boris Yeltsin; Yegor Gaidar (acting)

Minister of Press and Mass Media
- In office 14 July 1990 – 25 November 1992
- President: Boris Yeltsin
- Prime Minister: Ivan Silayev; Oleg Lobov (acting); Boris Yeltsin; Yegor Gaidar (acting)
- Preceded by: Ivan Vorozheikin
- Succeeded by: Mikhail Fedotov

Personal details
- Born: 22 November 1939 Leninogorsk, Kazakh SSR, Soviet Union
- Died: 16 November 2026 (aged 86) Moscow, Russia
- Profession: Journalist, television presenter

Mikhail Nikiforovich Poltoranin (Russian: Михаил Никифорович Полторанин; 22 November 1939 – 16 November 2026) was a Russian journalist and politician who served as the minister of the press and news from 1990 to 1992 and as the deputy prime minister in 1992. He was a close ally of Boris Yeltsin, having been appointed by him as chief editor of Moskovskaya Pravda in 1986, and later working on his 1989 and 1991 election campaigns. Poltoranin was also a member of the Congress of People's Deputies from the 1989 Soviet Union legislative election. He became a founding member of the party Democratic Choice of Russia in 1993, and was elected to the State Duma on the party list during the 1993 Russian legislative election.

== Early life and education ==
Mikhail Nikiforovich Poltoranin was born on 22 November 1939 in Leninogorsk, Kazakhstan SSR, Soviet Union. In 1956 he worked as a cement mason after school, contributing to the construction of the Bratsk Hydroelectric Power Station. From 1958 to 1961, he performed mandatory service in the Soviet Army. He graduated from the journalism department of Kazakh State University in 1966, and from the Higher Party School in 1970.

== Career ==
After working for several smaller newspapers, Poltoranin worked with the Communist Party dailies Pravda and later Moskovskaya Pravda. In 1986 he published several articles in Pravda documenting abuses by party officials in Lugansk, which brought him fame and led to several government resignations. In late 1986, he was made the chief editor of Moskovskaya Pravda by Boris Yeltsin, who led the Moscow City Committee of the Communist Party. Poltoranin was removed in 1987 (following Yeltsin's removal), and in 1989 he led Yeltsin's campaign during the 1989 Soviet Union legislative election.

Poltoranin became part of the Congress of People's Deputies in 1989 from the Union of Journalists. From 14 July 1990, he was the minister of the press and mass information of the Russian SFSR. In the 1991 Russian presidential election, Poltoranin was a leading member of Yeltsin's campaign along with Gennady Burbulis and Sergei Stankevich. He was a member of Yeltin's inner circle and defended the White House during the 1991 Soviet coup attempt. From 22 February 1992, as part of the new Russian Federation government formed by Boris Yeltsin, Mikhail Poltoranin was among the several deputy prime ministers. His role was to oversee the ministries regarding the press and cultural sphere. Poltoranin served in the governments of Ivan Silayev, Yeltsin, and Yegor Gaidar.

In April 1992, Vice President of Russia Alexander Rutskoy accused Yeltsin and his allies in various acts of corruption, including Poltoranin, who was accused of illegally selling off Russian property in Berlin. From 3 to 8 August 1992, Poltoranin visited Japan where he discussed the Kuril Islands dispute with Japanese officials, and proposed to get the United States involved in the question. The goal of this was to make sure that Russia's security interests in the region were addressed. Poltoranin ended up being sacked on 25 November 1992 from both his post as Minister of Information and Deputy Chairman of Government of the Russian Federation. This was largely viewed as a move to placate the conservative opposition by President Yeltsin, who wanted to win their support in the Congress of People's Deputies of Russia for his economic plan. Poltoranin understood this and accepted the status of being a political sacrifice.

On 25 December 1992, he became the director of the Federal Information Center. Poltoranin defended the agency as a way of delivering the public information about the reforms and rejected criticism that it represented Soviet censorship. In June 1993, he participated in the creation of the party Russia's Choice (later Democratic Choice of Russia) with Gaidar. Poltoranin was one of the many reform officials associated with the party during its election campaign. He resigned from the Federal Information Center on 22 December 1993 to take up his role in parliament after the 1993 Russian legislative election, as a party list member from Russia's Choice. Poltoranin led the State Duma Information Politics and Communications Committee. He failed to get reelected while running in Omsk constituency during the 1995 Russian legislative election.

== Death ==
Poltoranin died on 16 November 2026, at the age of 86, in Kommunarka, Moscow.

== Works ==
After stepping down from the government, Poltoranin published a book titled The lonely tsar in the Kremlin: Yeltsin and his team during the late 1990s.

== Racial views ==
Poltoranin expressed vehemently anti-Vainakh sentiments in his writings. In Chapter 5 of his book "Powerful as TNT. The Legacy of Tsar Boris" (Russian: Власть в тротиловом эквиваленте. Наследие царя Бориса) he described allowing exiled Chechens to return to Chechnya as the "Chechenization of Russia", used the phrase "acting Vainakh" as an insult, and compared Vainakh lands to sewage pits to support his reason for wanting to have a Chechen-Ingush Republic in East Kazakhstan instead of inside the North Caucasus of Russia.

== Sources ==
=== Books ===
- James Goodby; Vladimir Ivanov; Nobuo Shimotomari (1995). "Northern Territories" and Beyond: Russian, Japanese, and American Perspectives. Praeger. ISBN 978-0275950934.
- Huskey, Eugene (1992). Executive Power and Soviet Politics. Routledge. ISBN 978-1563240607.
- Knight, Amy (1997). Spies without Cloaks: The KGB's Successors. Princeton University Press. ISBN 978-0691017181.
- Kuhrt, Natasha (2007). Russian Policy towards China and Japan: The El'tsin and Putin Periods. Routledge. ISBN 978-0415674881.
