= Konstantin Kobets =

Russian army general (1939–2012)

- Константин Кобец

State Adviser of the RSFSR for Defense
- In office 10 September 1991 – 25 March 1992
- Preceded by: position established
- Succeeded by: position abolished

1st Minister of Defence
- In office 20 August 1991 – 9 September 1991
- Succeeded by: temporarily abolished Yevgeny Shaposhnikov (1991-1992) as Minister of Defence of the Soviet Union; Boris Yeltsin (Acting) (1992)

Personal details
- Born: Konstantin Ivanovich Kobets; 16 July 1939 Kiev, Ukrainian SSR, Soviet Union
- Died: 31 December 2012 (aged 73) Moscow, Russia
- Citizenship: Russian
- Profession: military officer, politician

Konstantin Ivanovich Kobets (Russian: Константин Иванович Кобец; Ukrainian: Костянтин Іванович Кобець; 16 July 1939 – 31 December 2012) was a Russian army general. In early 1991 he was serving as Deputy Chief of the Soviet General Staff for communications.

== Early life and career ==
He was born in Kiev in 1939. From 1970 to 1972, he served as the deputy commander of a communications regiment. Following this, from 1972 to 1974, he held the position of commander of a communications regiment within the Group of Soviet Forces in Germany. Continuing his career trajectory, he served as the chief of communications for the 14th Guards Combined Arms Army of the Odessa Military District from 1974 to 1976. Transitioning to higher ranks and responsibilities, he was appointed Deputy Chief of Signal Troops in the Transbaikal Military District from 1978 to 1980, and subsequently rose to the position of Chief of Signal Troops for the same district from 1980 to 1982. From 1982 to 1986, he served as the Chief of Signal Troops and Deputy Chief of Staff for the High Command of the Far East. In 1986, he participated in the response efforts to the Chernobyl disaster. From 1986 to 1987, he held the role of First Deputy Chief of Communication Troops within the Ministry of Defense of the Soviet Union, a position awaiting verification. Finally, from August 1987 to March 1991, he served as the head of Communication Troops of the Ministry of Defense of the Soviet Union, concurrently holding the position of Deputy Chief of the General Staff. He was conferred the rank of Colonel General on February 17, 1988, as part of his tenure in these roles.

In the spring of 1990, he made an official visit to People's Democratic Republic of Yemen.

== Russian politics ==
In 1990, he was elected as a people's deputy of the RSFSR from the city of Chekhov, Moscow Region. He headed a group of people's deputies of the RSFSR from the Armed Forces of the USSR.

On January 31, 1991, he was appointed Chairman of the RSFSR State Committee for Defense and Security. On May 5 of the same year, this State Committee was divided into the RSFSR State Committee for Defense Affairs and the KGB of the RSFSR.

From May 17 to July 10, 1991 - Chairman of the State Committee of the RSFSR for Defence, who took office on July 10, 1991. Since July 11, 1991, Chairman of the State Committee of the RSFSR for Defence. When the second Government of Ivan Silaev was formed on July 30, 1991, this committee was renamed the State Committee of the RSFSR on Defence Issues. He was reappointed as chairman on August 19, however, on September 9 this decision was canceled.

The position of the Minister of Defence was temporarily established in the RSFSR on August 20, 1991, until the full restoration of the activities of the constitutional bodies of state power and administration of the USSR. On the same day Colonel General Konstantin Ivanovich Kobets was appointed Minister of Defence of the RSFSR, since he was the most high-ranking military leader who, from the first day of the events of the August Coup, stood on the side of B. N. Yeltsin. On August 24, 1991, he was awarded the military rank of Army General. Already on September 9, 1991, the position of the Minister of Defense of the RSFSR was abolished.

On September 10, 1991, he was appointed State Councilor of the RSFSR for defense and a member of the State Council of the RSFSR, despite the fact that he was already a member of the council as well, Chairman of the State Committee on Defense Issues. From September to December 1991, simultaneously Chairman of the Committee for the preparation and implementation of military reform under the State Council USSR. On March 25, 1992, he was released from the post of State Counselor and placed at the disposal of the Commander-in-Chief of the CIS Allied Forces, Air Marshal Yevgeny Shaposhnikov.

On April 4, 1992, by order of the President of the Russian Federation No. 158-rp, the State Commission for the creation of the Ministry of Defense, Army and Navy of Russia was created. Advisor to the President Dmitry Volkogonov was appointed chairman of the commission, and deputies were Pavel Grachev, Andrey Kokoshin, K. I. Kobets and Yu. V. Skokov.

Since September 1992 - Chief Military Inspector of Armed Forces of the Russian Federation; at the same time since June 1993 - Deputy Minister of Defense of the Russian Federation, and since January 1995 - Secretary of State - Deputy Minister of Defense of the Russian Federation.

Kobets supported then President of the RSFSR Boris Yeltsin during the August coup of 1991. From August 19 until September 9, 1991, Konstantin Kobets was Defense Minister of the RSFSR (albeit there was no ministry). This post was then abolished.

== Later years ==
On May 18, 1997, he was removed from his post and dismissed from the Armed Forces and was arrested on charges of accepting a bribe and illegal possession of weapons. He was sentenced to two years in prison in 1997 for corruption and misuse of defense ministry funds. Before his arrest, he was often called one of the most likely candidates for the post of Minister of Defense of the Russian Federation. On the other hand, his name was constantly at the center of various corruption scandals. Communists and ultra-nationalists strongly disliked him for his adherence to the course of the President of the Russian Federation B. N. Yeltsin: in August 1991, he led the so-called defense of the “White House”, and in October 1993, on the contrary, he collected tankers to storm the White House. In 1998, he admitted his guilt and was released from custody on his own recognizance. In 2000, his case was dropped due to an amnesty, after which he declared the invalidity of his earlier admission of guilt.

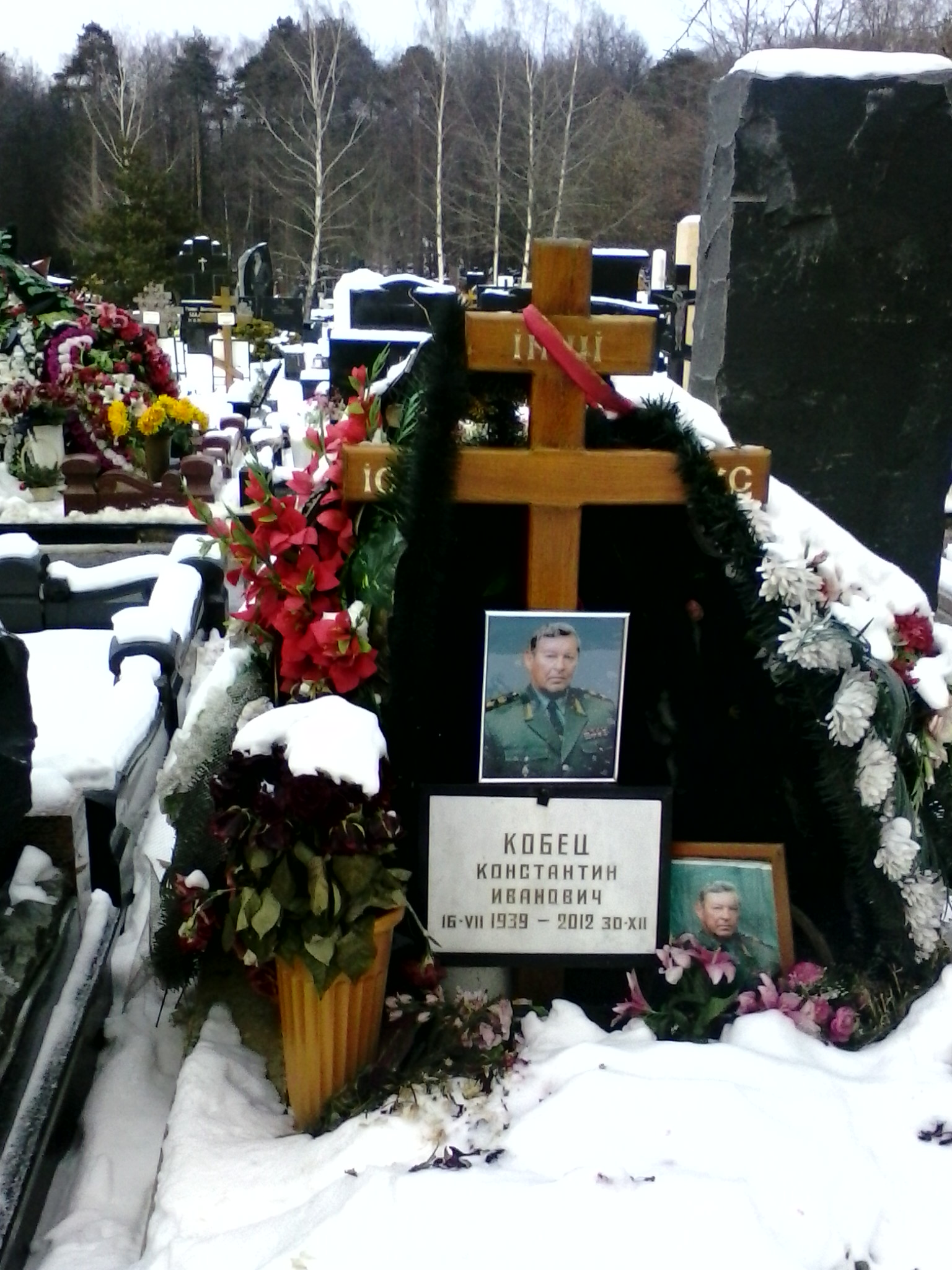
Kobets' grave at Troyekurovskoye Cemetery in February 2014

He was chair of the Russian Government's military reform committee in late 1991. In that position he developed a plan for the creation of the Commonwealth of Independent States Armed Forces. This plan was presented to a council of defence officials of the Soviet republics on 26–27 December 1991. However, it was not adopted by the meeting and was superseded in any case by the effective breakup of the former Soviet Armed Forces among the former republics of the Soviet Union.

== Death ==
He died at the age of 74 on 31 December 2012 in Moscow. He was buried on 2 January 2013 at the Troyekurovskoye Cemetery.

== Awards ==
- Order of Military Merit (1996)
- Order “For Personal Courage” (October 7, 1993)
- Order of the Red Banner (December 24, 1991)
- Order of the October Revolution
- Order of the Red Star
- Order "For Service to the Homeland in the Armed Forces of the USSR"
