= Oleg Lobov =

Russian politician

- Олег Лобов

Secretary of the Security Council of Russia
- In office 18 September 1993 – 18 June 1996
- President: Boris Yeltsin
- Preceded by: Yevgeny Shaposhnikov
- Succeeded by: Alexander Lebed

Minister of Economics
- In office 15 April 1993 – 18 September 1993
- Prime Minister: Viktor Chernomyrdin
- Preceded by: Andrey Nechaev; Andrey Shapovalyants (acting)
- Succeeded by: Yegor Gaidar (acting); Alexander Shokhin

Acting Chairman of the Council of Ministers of the Russian SFSR
- In office 26 September 1991 – 15 November 1991
- President: Boris Yeltsin
- Preceded by: Ivan Silayev
- Succeeded by: Boris Yeltsin (interim)

First Deputy Chairman of the Council of Ministers of the RSFSR
- In office 19 April 1991 – 15 November 1991
- Prime Minister: Ivan Silayev
- Preceded by: Yevgeny Sizenko
- Succeeded by: Gennady Burbulis

Personal details
- Born: Oleg Ivanovich Lobov; 7 September 1937 Kiev, Ukrainian SSR, Soviet Union (now Kyiv, Ukraine)
- Died: 6 September 2018 (aged 80)
- Resting place: Troyekurovskoye Cemetery
- Party: CPSU (1971–91)
- Awards: Order of Lenin Order of the October Revolution Order of the Badge of Honour

Oleg Ivanovich Lobov (Russian: Олег Иванович Лобов; 7 September 1937 – 6 September 2018) was a Russian politician who served as acting First Deputy Chairman of the Council of Ministers of the Russian Soviet Federated Socialist Republic from 19 April 1991 to 15 November 1991 and also was acting Chairman of the Council of Ministers of the Russian SFSR from 26 September 1991 to 15 November 1991, shortly before the dissolution of the Soviet Union.

Until 17 March 1997, Lobov served in various capacities in Russian state and government bodies. His last position was Deputy Head of the Government of the Russian Federation. As of October 2010, Lobov was the chairman of the non-governmental Association for International Cooperation and participated in various construction-related associations and unions.

== Education ==
Born in Kiev, he had a Candidate of Technical Sciences (PhD) degree and graduated from Rostov Institute of Engineers of Railway Transport in 1960.

== Career ==
From 1960 to 1967, he was employed in chemistry and construction industries in Sverdlovsk. He occupied various posts in the Sverdlovsk Communist Party of the Soviet Union), where Boris Yeltsin made a party career, rising up to the regional party head. Then worked in construction and returned to party work in 1982.

From 19 April 19 to 15 November 1991 Lobov was First Deputy Chairman of the Council of Ministers of the RSFSR in the first and second cabinets of Ivan Silayev. With Silayev's resignation on 26 September 1991 Lobov became de facto acting prime minister of Russia. He kept the position until the formation of the reformist cabinet on 6 November and final resignation of Silayev's second cabinet on 15 November.

== Controversy ==
From 1991 to 1995, Lobov actively helped Aum Shinrikyo, a Japanese new religious movement, to establish operations in Russia. According to allegations made in the United States Senate in 1995, Lobov's relationship with Aum began in December 1991 and continued to 1995. Lobov was accused of receiving cash advances from Aum and of regularly meeting with Aum "minister of construction" Kiyohide Hayakawa. Lobov allegedly met with Shoko Asahara in Japan and arranged Asahara's own visit to Russia in 1992.

== Business activity ==
He established two business entities, Rinco (РИНКО) and ZentrEKOMASH (ЦЕНТР ЭНЕРГОМАШ).

== Awards ==
- Order of Lenin (1978)
- Order of the Badge of Honour (1974)
- Honorary title "Honoured Builder of the Russian Federation" (1982)
- Medal "For the Development of Virgin Lands" (1957)
- Medal "On the 40th anniversary of the completion of the national liberation struggle of the Czechoslovak people and the liberation of Czechoslovakia by the Soviet Army" (1985)
- Medal "Defender of Free Russia" (5 August 1994) for the execution of a citizen's duty during the defence of democracy and the constitutional regime, 19–21 August 1991, large contribution to the realization of democratic transformation, fortifying friendship and collaboration between nations
- State Prize of the Russian Federation in the field of science and technology (2000)

== Footnotes ==
Political offices
Preceded by Ivan Silayev	Premier of the Russian SFSR; Acting; 26 September 1991 – 15 November 1991	Succeeded by Boris Yeltsin
Preceded by Yevgeny Shaposhnikov	Secretary of the Security Council of Russia; 1993–1996	Succeeded by Alexander Lebed
