= Valery Tishkov =

Russian ethnologist (1941)

- Валерий Тишков
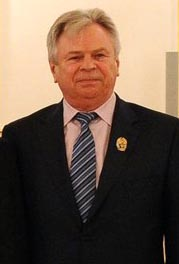
- Tishkov in 2015
- Born: 1941 (age 84–85); Sverdlovsk
- Education: Moscow State University
- Known for: contributions to the theory of nation, and as a politician
- Scientific career
- Fields: ethnohistory, theory of nation, political anthropology
- Workplaces: Russian State University for the Humanities, Russian Academy of Sciences

Valery Aleksandrovich Tishkov (Russian: Вале́рий Алекса́ндрович Тишко́в; born 6 November 1941) is an ethnologist and former chairman of the State Committee of the Russian SFSR on nationalities from 27 February to 15 October 1992 (Minister for Nationalities according to Carnegie Endowment for International Peace).

== Early life ==
Born in Sverdlovsk, Tishkov attended Moscow State University, where he received a B.A. in 1964. He earned an M.A. in 1969 from North-Eastern State University in Magadan, and a Ph.D. in 1978 from the USSR Academy of Sciences. Since 2000, he has been Director of the Institute of Ethnology and Anthropology of the Russian Academy of Sciences (IEA).

== Career ==
Tishkov started his academic career in Canadian ethnohistory with two books on pre-Confederation Canada and the first Russian version of the History of Canada (1982). His publications gave birth to Canadian studies within Russia. In the 1980s, he studied indigenous peoples and published a general text on the contemporary Amerindian population of North America. His primary interests were in political status, historic and comprehensive claims, Indian government and movements.

Since 1990 he has focused on the ethnic factor in Russian transformation as well as on the theory and political practice of ethnicity.

Tishkov's theoretical challenge came also from his formula ‘Forget the Nation’ (2000) where he suggested a post-nationalist understanding of nationalism. He argued that the nation is a powerful metaphor which two forms of social groupings – polity and ethnic entity – are fighting to have as their exclusive property. There is no sense in defining states and ethnic groups by the category of nation. The latter is a ghost word, escalated to a level of meta-category through historical accident and the inertia of intellectual prescription. A suggested ‘hard scenario’ for breaking the methodological impasse is a ‘zero option’, when both major clients for being a nation will be deprived of a luxury called by that label.

He edited two fundamental encyclopedias on ethnic groups of Russia (1994) and ethnic groups and religions of the world (1998) that present a comprehensive enterprise in ethnographic reference literature.

Tishkov is a full member of the Russian Academy of Sciences.

Since 2005 he has been a member of the Civic Chamber of Russia.

== Key Publications ==
- (1990) Indigenous Peoples of North America. Moscow: Nauka.
- (1996) Ethnic Conflicts in the Context of Social Science Theories // Ethnicity and Power in the Contemporary World. United Nations University Press. Tokyo, New York, Paris. 1996. P.52-68.
- (1997) Ethnicity, Nationalism and Conflict in and after the Soviet Union. The Mind Aflame. London: Sage Publications.
- (1997) Political Anthropology of the Chechen War // Security Dialogue, vol. 28, N 4, December 1997, p. 425-437.
- (1998) U.S. and Russian Anthropology. Unequal Dialogue in a Time of Transition // Current Anthropology, vol. 39, N 1, February 1998, p. 1-17.
- (1998) La Caucase du Nord: Problemes et politique// Nouveaux mondes, 1998, N 8, p. 147-156.
- (2000) Political Anthropology. Lewiston-Queenston-Lampeter: The Edwin Mellen Press.
- (2004) Chechnya: Life in a War-Torn Society. University of California Press, 2004
