= Yegor Gaidar =

Soviet-Russian economist and politician (1956–2009)

- Егор Гайдар
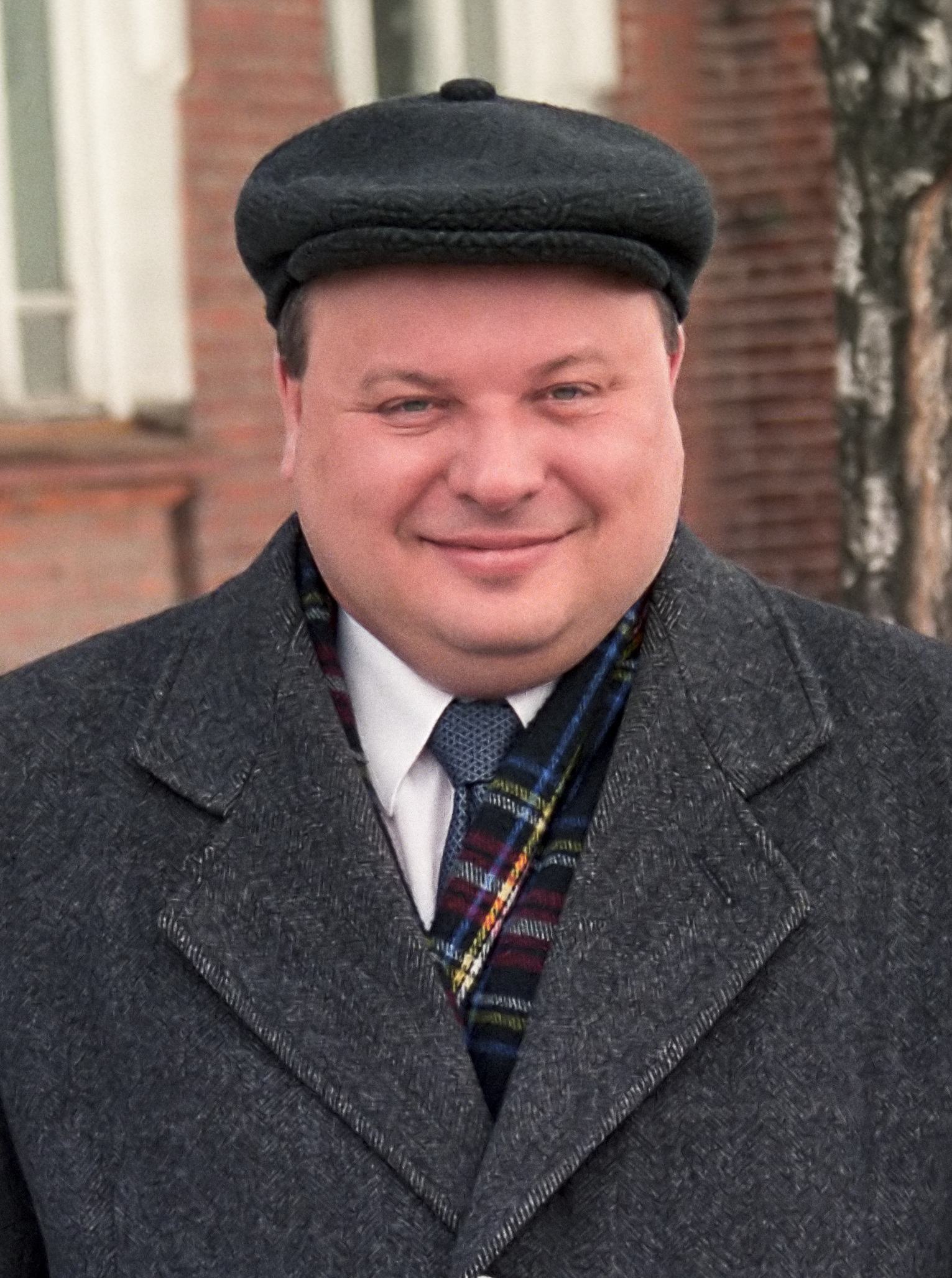
- Gaidar in 1999

Acting Prime Minister of Russia
- In office 15 June 1992 – 14 December 1992
- President: Boris Yeltsin
- Deputy: See list: Himself; Vladimir Shumeyko; Alexander Shokhin; Viktor Chernomyrdin; Sergey Shakhray; Mikhail Poltoranin; Valery Makharadze; Georgy Khizha; Anatoly Chubais; Boris Saltykov
- Preceded by: Boris Yeltsin (acting)
- Succeeded by: Viktor Chernomyrdin

Member of the State Duma
- In office 19 December 1999 – 7 December 2003
- Constituency: Party list
- In office 12 December 1993 – 16 January 1996
- Constituency: Party list

First Deputy Prime Minister of Russia
- In office 18 September 1993 – 20 January 1994
- Prime Minister: Viktor Chernomyrdin
- Preceded by: Oleg Lobov
- Succeeded by: Oleg Soskovets
- In office 2 March 1992 – 15 December 1992
- Prime Minister: Boris Yeltsin (acting); Himself (acting)
- Preceded by: Gennady Burbulis
- Succeeded by: Vladimir Shumeyko
Other offices
Deputy Prime Minister of Russia for Economic Policy
In office 6 November 1991 – 2 March 1992
Prime Minister	Boris Yeltsin (acting)
Preceded by	Post established
Succeeded by	Anatoly Chubais
Minister of Finance of Russia
In office 11 November 1991 – 2 April 1992
Prime Minister	Boris Yeltsin (acting)
Preceded by	Igor Lazarev
Succeeded by	Vasily Barchuk
Minister of Economy of Russia
In office Acting: 22 September 1993 – 20 January 1994
Prime Minister	Viktor Chernomyrdin
Preceded by	Oleg Lobov
Succeeded by	Alexander Shokhin
In office 11 November 1991 – 19 February 1992
Prime Minister	Boris Yeltsin (acting)
Preceded by	Yevgeny Saburov
Succeeded by	Andrey Nechayev

Personal details
- Born: Yegor Timurovich Gaidar; 19 March 1956 Moscow, Russian SFSR, Soviet Union
- Died: 16 December 2009 (aged 53) Odintsovo, Russia
- Party: Union of Rightist Forces (2001–2008)
- Other political affiliations: CPSU (1980–1991); Democratic Choice (1993–2001)
- Spouses: Irina Smirnova (divorced); Maria Strugatskaya
- Children: 4, including Maria
- Education: Moscow State University

Yegor Timurovich Gaidar (Note: In this name that follows East Slavic naming customs, the patronymic is Timurovich and the family name is Gaidar.) (/jɪˈɡɔːr ɡaɪˈdɑːr/; Russian: Егор Тимурович Гайдар, IPA: [jɪˈɡor tʲɪˈmurəvʲɪtɕ ɡɐjˈdar]; 19 March 1956 – 16 December 2009) was a Soviet and Russian economist, politician, and author who was the acting Prime Minister of Russia in 1992 and simultaneously held several other cabinet roles. Gaidar was also in the State Duma from 1993 to 1996 and from 1999 to 2003 as a member of Democratic Choice of Russia and the Union of Right Forces.

Gaidar was the son of a Soviet naval officer and graduated from Moscow State University. He worked in economic research institutes before joining a commission that advised Soviet President Mikhail Gorbachev in the 1980s. Following the dissolution of the Soviet Union, Gaidar was the chief architect of Russia's controversial shock therapy reforms, which brought him both praise and harsh criticism. He entered the cabinet led by President Boris Yeltsin as Minister of Finance, Minister of Economy, and Deputy Prime Minister for Economic Policy, serving from 1991 to 1992. He was also the First Deputy Prime Minister of Russia in 1992, with Yeltsin and later himself as acting prime minister, and again from 1993 to 1994, in Viktor Chernomyrdin's cabinet, where he was also the acting Minister of Economy. Gaidar became widely unpopular for his reforms to transition Russia to a market economy, during which the country experienced hyperinflation and mass impoverishment, and the parliament pressured Yeltsin to remove him. He left the government in early 1994, when the administration decided to take a more gradual approach to economic reform.

Many Russians held him responsible for the economic hardships that plagued the Russian Federation in the 1990s, although liberals praised him as a man who did what had to be done to save the country from complete collapse. Gaidar founded the party Democratic Choice of Russia, and as a member of that party was elected to the State Duma in the 1993 legislative election. He stopped supporting Boris Yeltsin due to the First Chechen War. Democratic Choice of Russia failed to win any seats in the 1995 election, but Gaidar returned to the Duma in the 1999 election when his party joined the Union of Right Forces electoral bloc. He was an advisor to Mikhail Kasyanov, the prime minister in the early administration of President Vladimir Putin. After the electoral bloc failed to keep its seats in the 2003 election, Gaidar left politics and returned to academic work, though he was still consulted for economic advice. He went on to publish several books on economics. Gaidar died of pulmonary edema provoked by myocardial ischemia in 2009.

== Early life and education ==
Gaidar was born in 1956 in Moscow, RSFSR, Soviet Union, the son of Ariadna Bazhova and Pravda military correspondent Timur Gaidar, who fought in the Bay of Pigs Invasion and was a friend of Raúl Castro. His paternal grandfather was Soviet writer Arkady Gaidar and his maternal grandfather was writer Pavel Bazhov. They had both been devoted Bolsheviks that fought in the 1917 Russian Revolution. Despite the Turkic-sounding surname, Gaidar was Russian; his grandfather, originally called "Golikov", adopted the name "Gaidar" from the Khakas language as a nom-de-plume.

Because his father was a Soviet Navy one-star admiral and was often posted to "hot spots," it has been speculated that he was a member of the GRU, Soviet military intelligence. Yegor Gaidar spent part of his childhood at his father's postings. He was in Cuba during the Cuban Missile Crisis in 1962, and was in Yugoslavia in 1966, where, as he later said, he saw a socialist country with a market economy, open political discourse, and fully stocked shops. His father noticed that he had a talent for mathematics and entrusted him with keeping business expenditure reports, which was the start of his interest in economics. According to Gaidar, the Soviet reaction to the 1968 Prague Spring, along with the turn of Yugoslavia away from the Soviet model and radical economic reforms in Hungary, had an impact on his views. He later studied at Moscow State University's Faculty of Economics, where he learned about Marxist theory as well as other economic thought. One of Gaidar's professors explained to his students in private in the 1970s why he thought the Soviet economy was on the verge of collapse, and was only propped up by revenue from oil exports.

During his studies, Gaidar reached the view that any form of socialism, including market socialism, was destined to fail. Despite this, he continued to use Marxist methodology, including the Marxist explanation that the genesis of economic systems was the development of productive forces.

== Political and economic career ==
Gaidar graduated with honors from Moscow State University in 1980 and worked as a researcher in several academic institutes. He studied liberalizing reforms in socialist economies. After obtaining his doctorate in economics, Gaidar was put in charge of the economic policy section of the party's ideological journal, Communist. In 1990 he became the head of the economic section of Pravda. Gaidar was a member of the Communist Party of the Soviet Union until it was dissolved in August 1991.

The perestroika reforms allowed Gaidar and other young economists to publish their ideas in the party's official journals, and his position in newspapers increased his influence in party ideological circles. He supported the reforms of President Mikhail Gorbachev and became a member of the commission under the Soviet Politburo to study ways to improve the management of the economy. During this time Gaidar met Gorbachev on several occasions, and participated in the introduction to government terminology such terms as radical economic reform, market, individual entrepreneurship, unemployment, poverty, and inflation, among others. Gaidar thought that the government should focus on liberalization and financial stabilization. Gorbachev was receptive to advice from liberal economists, but he was also under pressure from traditional forces. Meanwhile, the Soviet economy was experiencing a deep crisis as oil prices declined significantly between 1981 and 1987, undermining the Soviet Union's ability to import consumer goods such as food using energy revenue. Gorbachev rejected a 500 Day Plan for reform that was proposed by some economists in favor of a less radical version, and without a timetable. Gaidar criticized the plan as being too radical, but in April 1990 he wrote that "the time is past when the economy could be stabilized without difficult and unpopular measures." In late 1990 he organized the Institute for Economic Policy.

Gaidar joined Yeltsin's government in 1991 because he was known by Alexei Golovkov, a member of the Russian Supreme Soviet who worked with the secretary of state of the Russian Soviet Federative Socialist Republic, Gennady Burbulis. After Yeltsin was elected as president of Russia in June 1991, Golovkov spoke to his associates about Gaidar's work in the journals Pravda and Communist. Gaidar first met Burbulis during the August 1991 coup attempt. Burbulis was tasked with assembling a new cabinet in his role as secretary of state, which would also be responsible for reform. Gaidar advised Yeltsin's associates to seize control of the Soviet central government and subordinate them to the Russian government in order to preserve the union, but this was not done. However, they gave Gaidar the opportunity to try his economic ideas in practice. Burbulis convinced a reluctant Yeltsin of Gaidar's radical economic proposal to "jump start" the Russian economy, which Gaidar believed was necessary to prevent economic collapse. Yeltsin later met Gaidar and accepted his proposal. He was impressed with Gaidar's ability to simplify complex economic ideas and his promise of a quick reform that would produce results within a year.

=== Economic reforms and premiership ===
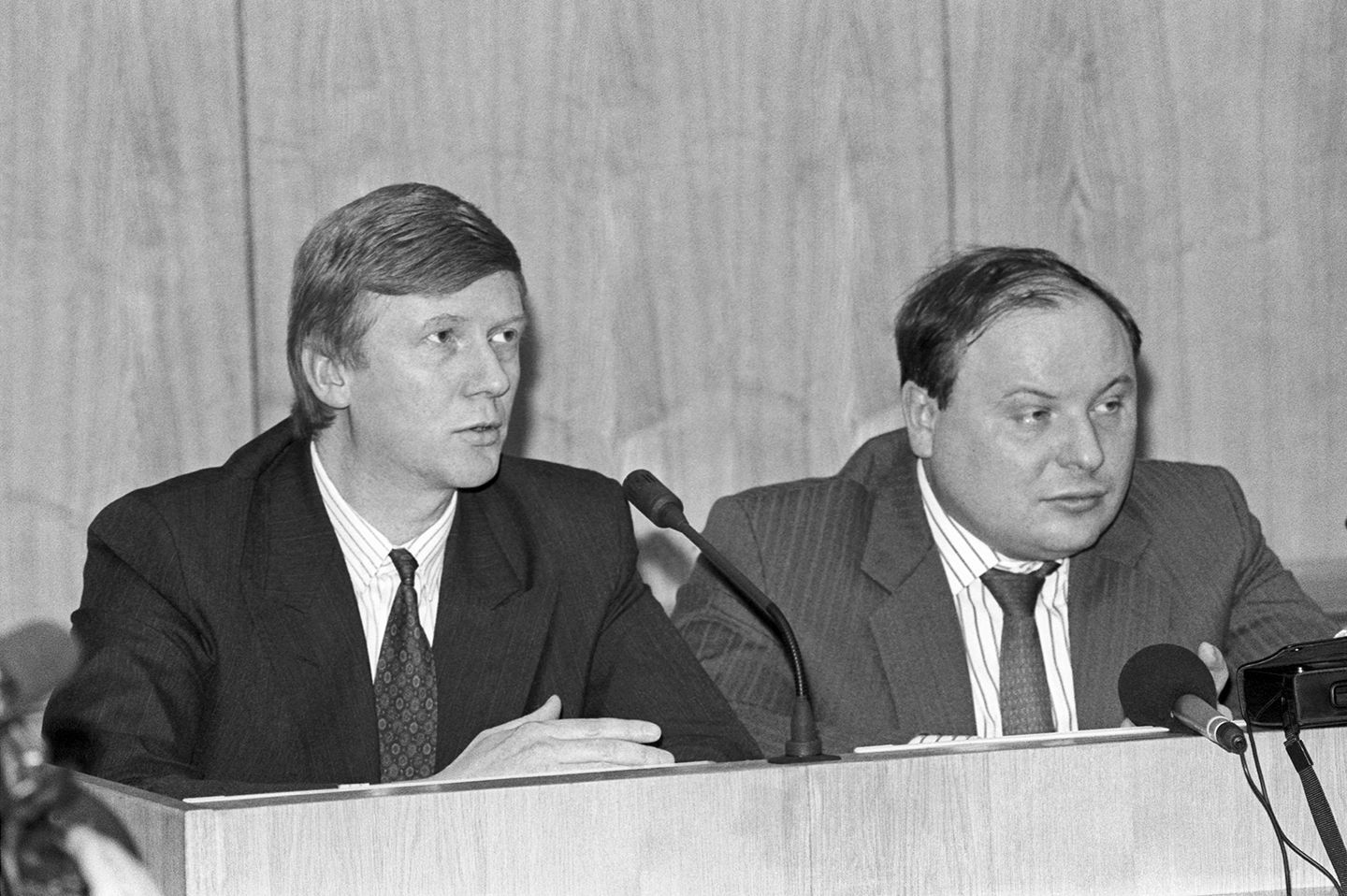
Anatoly Chubais (left) and Gaidar at the Russian parliament, on 29 October 1992.

While in government, Gaidar advocated free market economic reforms according to the principle of shock therapy. President Yeltsin took effective power in the Russian SFSR after the August 1991 coup attempt, and in November 1991 a new cabinet took office with a mandate to implement radical economic reforms. It was led by President Yeltsin in the place of a prime minister, and Gaidar as deputy prime minister for economic policy. Gaidar was the chief architect of the reform, and, along with Anatoly Chubais and Boris Fyodorov, and foreign advisors Jeffrey Sachs and Anders Aslund, became known as the "radical liberal reformers" who wanted a quick transition to a market economy in Russia. At the time of their appointment, Gaidar and the other Russian reformers were in their thirties and were unknown, and were also called the "young reformers". The dissolution of the Soviet Union and the creation of the Russian Federation occurred in late December 1991, and the reforms began with the lifting of Soviet-era price controls on 2 January 1992.

In November 1991 Gaidar said that the reforms would follow examples of other Eastern European states and would begin with the liberalization of price controls and strict austerity. He also claimed that the broad structural reforms that some economists argued were necessary for the transition to a market economy would take too long. In essence, Gaidar wanted the immediate liberalization of prices and trade while simultaneously achieving macroeconomic stabilization by reducing the money supply and cutting government spending. Once this was achieved, privatization would be the next stage. In October 1991, Gaidar had said that under shock therapy prices would rise to no more than 200%. However, in January 1992 alone, prices rose by 300%, and as much as 1,000% in the first three months. In February, Gaidar said the reform would continue and would lead to improvements in the next ten months. He also resisted calls from other officials to resign, including Alexander Rutskoy and Ruslan Khasbulatov, and did not answer their questions. Gaidar called on the Russian Central Bank to reduce money printing, which was needed to control hyperinflation and make the reform successful, and called on the IMF to provide more funding for a currency stabilization fund.

On 7 April 1992, as the cost of living skyrocketed, the conservative Congress of People's Deputies moved to take away from Yeltsin the powers that were granted to him for economic reforms. Gaidar argued that continuing the reforms was the only way forward. Gaidar and his cabinet later offered to resign, which led the U.S. to threaten to withhold financial assistance. Under pressure from G7 countries and the IMF, including a visit from U.S. Treasury Secretary Nicholas Brady to Moscow, Congress voted on 14 April to affirm its support for the Yeltsin cabinet's reform. Gaidar said that vote by Congress was a sign that the reform must continue, but added that some measures would be taken to provide assistance, such as tax cuts and subsidies to farmers and investors. Gaidar, despite having hinted at the loss of foreign support, later denied that foreign pressure played any role in the vote. At the end of that month, the IMF granted membership to Russia, and advised the government to cut subsidies to factories as a way of reducing inflation.

In 1991 Gaidar started out as the minister of finance and minister of economy in addition to being deputy prime minister. In a cabinet restructuring in February 1992, Andrey Nechayev was given the economy portfolio. In early April 1992 Vasily Barchuk became the finance minister, while Gaidar remained deputy prime minister. Gaidar said that the changes would allow him to be in a single post that focused on the overall economic reform. He became the first deputy prime minister, and on 15 June 1992, Gaidar was named acting prime minister by Yeltsin. Stabilization and privatization were more politically complex, and the Gaidar cabinet grew to have one first deputy prime minister and seven deputy prime ministers, compared to one and two, respectively, at the start of the year.

In early July the IMF reached an agreement with Gaidar to allow Russia to begin borrowing the first $1 billion of the $24 billion loan. In August, the Russian Central Bank chief, Viktor Gerashchenko, announced he would resume giving credit to indebted state-owned factories, a move that Gaidar and the reformers opposed because it would increase hyperinflation. As of July, it was printing more rubles each month than in the previous thirty years. As of September, the Central Bank was also sending as much as 10% of Russia's gross national product to other CIS countries as credit. It answered to the conservative-dominated parliament, not to the reformers. Gaidar said in late September that monetary policy needed to be tightened, and blamed the central bank's issuing of credit for increasing inflation, the devaluing of the ruble, a growing budget deficit, and falling industrial production. By the end of the inaugural year of reform, 1992, inflation was over 2,000% and half of the population was in poverty. There was increasing opposition in the Congress to the Yeltsin-Gaidar economic agenda, which was laissez-faire, while parliament, led by Ruslan Khasbulatov, favored the Nordic model of a mixed economy. Gaidar argued to Congress that the debate over the American and Nordic models had to wait until a market economy was established.

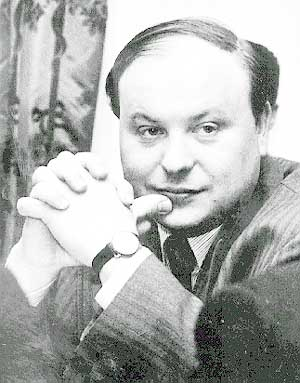
Gaidar during the 1990s.

In the fall of 1992 Yeltsin's Democratic Russia bloc lost much of its support. After serving six months as acting prime minister without legislative approval, and facing massive criticism for the reforms, Gaidar was nominated by Yeltsin for a vote in December 1992. Yeltsin offered the parliament control over four key ministries, in foreign and security policy, in return for confirming Gaidar and leaving him control over economic policy. The move was unsuccessful, and Yeltsin had to submit five candidates for prime minister so that parliament did not remove his presidential powers. Viktor Chernomyrdin was confirmed on 14 December, while Gaidar finished third place in the final vote. Chernomyrdin had worked with Gaidar's cabinet and agreed to continue the reforms, so he was recommended as a potential candidate to Yeltsin by Gaidar. At the same time he was far more liked in parliament than Gaidar.

=== Exit and brief return to the government ===
Gaidar initially stayed quiet after leaving the government, but in February 1993 he criticized the central bank and parliament for being inflationary, blaming them for Russia's economic downturn over the previous few months. As Yeltsin sought to address the Kuril Islands dispute with Japan in order to receive Japanese financial aid, Gaidar visited the country in May at the invitation of its Liberal Democratic Party. He said that Russian public opinion was against ceding territory. During his time out of the government he also founded a political party called Russia's Choice and continued to advocate for reform.

Chernomyrdin continued Gaidar's program at a slower pace, and on 16 September 1993 Yeltsin invited Gaidar to rejoin the cabinet. He was to replace Oleg Lobov as first deputy prime minister, who was in a dispute with Boris Fyodorov. Chernomyrdin said that it was his decision to bring back Gaidar, as the economy was struggling, and the West may withhold financial aid over a lack of commitment to reforms. Gaidar took office on 18 September, pledging to fight hyperinflation and to increase protections for private property, and was also the acting minister of economy. During the Russian constitutional crisis of 1993, on 3 October, he famously spoke live on Russian television, then broadcasting from an emergency station near Moscow, as there was fighting going on in the Ostankino complex, calling on Muscovites to gather to defend Yeltsin's government so that Russia would not be "turned into an enormous concentration camp for decades".

In the December 1993 legislative election, Gaidar led the pro-government bloc Russia's Choice, which failed to win a majority in the State Duma. After the election, Yeltsin admitted that the economic crisis in Russia was comparable to the situation in 1930s Weimar Germany, but also said that he would not remove Gaidar or the other reformers. In January 1994, Gaidar and other members of Russia's Choice began distancing themselves from the administration, which had taken some measures that they did not agree with. Gaidar said that the government subsidized unprofitable enterprises and bought grain at artificially high prices with deficit spending. The reformers were isolated in the new parliament, as the anti-government Communists, the Liberal Democratic Party of Russia (LDPR), and the Agrarian Party of Russia reached an agreement among themselves. Later that month, Gaidar announced he would be leaving the cabinet due to his disagreements with the administration. He stepped down on 16 January 1994. Within days, his resignation and the threat of Finance Minister Boris Fyodorov to also resign, along with continued disagreement in the cabinet over the course of economic policy, caused the Russian ruble to decline to a record low of 1,504 against the U.S. dollar. The cabinet reshuffle ended with the departure of most of the economic reformers, except for Anatoly Chubais.

=== Involvement in electoral politics ===
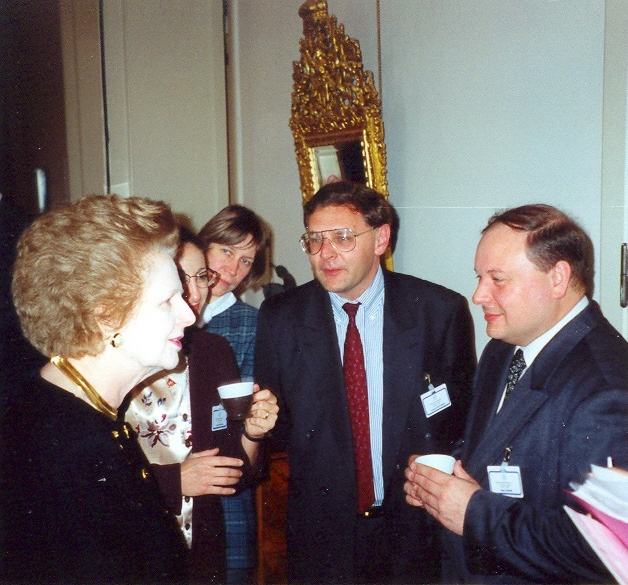
Gaidar with former British prime minister Margaret Thatcher, on 1 May 1996.

After leaving the cabinet, in February 1994 Gaidar criticized the government's new direction, alleging they wanted to increase state intervention in the economy to send more of it into their own pockets. The following month, he said that the government was not taking necessary measures against inflation, and criticized the signing of a monetary union with Belarus, calling it "purely political" and claiming that it was extremely favorable to the other country, whose currency was trading at 18,600 against the U.S. dollar. On 12 June 1994, at the proposal of Gaidar, members of the Russia's Choice coalition decided to create a more centralized movement, establishing the Democratic Choice of Russia party, with the goal of more effectively opposing communist and nationalist political forces in future elections. The following day, he was elected as party leader, and argued for the continued movement of Russia in the direction of democracy and a market-oriented economy.

In late August 1994 Gaidar visited Belgrade and Sarajevo, where spoke with local officials, including Bosnian Serb leader Radovan Karadzic. Gaidar said that his party, Democratic Choice of Russia, was willing to guarantee a union between the state of Serbia and Montenegro, and the Serb Republic in Bosnia-Herzegovina. He also met Zoran Đinđić, the head of the Democratic Party of Serbia who invited Gaidar, and signed a cooperation agreement. Gaidar criticized Yeltsin's decision to send troops into Chechnya in December 1994, and his party no longer supported Yeltsin due to the First Chechen War. In March 1995 he visited Poland at the invitation of Tadeusz Mazowiecki, the leader of the Freedom Union party, where he announced that Democratic Choice of Russia does not oppose NATO expansion. Ahead of the December 1995 legislative election, it was predicted that Gaidar's party would not reach the 5% threshold needed to remain in parliament, losing the seats it gained in the last election two years ago. That did occur, and Democratic Choice of Russia was no longer in the Duma after the election. Reformist leaders such as Gaidar and Grigory Yavlinsky were criticized in the Russian liberal press for not agreeing to a united front in the election, in which the two main winners were the anti-reform Communists of Gennady Zyuganov and the far-right LDPR of Vladimir Zhirinovsky.

When Yeltsin began his re-election campaign in January 1996, Gaidar called on him to drop out of the race to avoid splitting the liberal vote between Yeltsin and Yavlinsky. Gaidar said that Yeltsin's nomination is "the best present one could give the Communists." During the NATO bombing of Yugoslavia in the spring of 1999, Gaidar, Boris Nemtsov and Boris Fyodorov were in Belgrade on a mediation mission. They were there on their own private initiative, and the Yeltsin administration downplayed their mission. The group also spoke with U.S. envoy Richard Holbrooke. Gaidar said that the NATO attack was also a bombing of Russian democracy. In the December 1999 legislative election, Gaidar joined several other prominent pro-reform leaders in the coalition Union of Right Forces, with which he was elected to the State Duma. In May 2001 the parties that made up the coalition decided to unify into one party, at which point Democratic Choice of Russia was dissolved. Gaidar was initially going to stand in the vote for leader of the new party, but withdrew at the last minute.

According to Gaidar, the victory of Vladimir Putin in the March 2000 presidential election was "absolutely unexpected," but was also a positive development for pro-reform economists, as Putin supported a "radical version" of their program when he became prime minister in 1999. As a member of the State Duma, Gaidar supported the lowering of the top income tax rate from 35% to 12% in July 2000, which was done at the request of President Putin. He continued to be an advisor to the government, and during the premiership of Mikhail Kasyanov, the prime minister of the early Putin administration from 2000 to 2004, Gaidar was involved in every reform project by the cabinet. In June 2002 Gaidar said that he believed Russia has become a market economy. The Union of Right Forces failed to keep its seats in the State Duma in the December 2003 legislative election.

== Later life and work ==
Gaidar returned to his academic work after leaving politics, and published multiple books that studied and compared historic economic models and institutions. According to Russian finance minister Alexei Kudrin, Gaidar continued to be consulted for advice on economic matters up until the day of his death. After Putin consolidated his power as the president of Russia, Gaidar distanced himself from the liberal opposition to Vladimir Putin in Russia and did not criticize him directly. He did not comment of the arrest of Mikhail Khodorkovsky or the murder of Anna Politkovskaya, and gave positive assessments of the economy under Putin, in contrast to other liberal or left-wing economists such as Mikhail Delyagin, Yevgeny Yasin, Sergey Glazyev, or Andrei Illarionov.

=== Poisoning case ===
In November 2006 Gaidar went to Dublin, Ireland, to present his book Collapse of an Empire: Lessons for Modern Russia at an academic conference. Shortly after breakfast, a fruit salad and a cup of tea, Gaidar felt sick and returned from the conference hall to his room at the hotel. He was called on the phone to come down and deliver his speech, which Gaidar later recalled as a call that saved his life, as he would surely have died if he had been in his room unattended. After Gaidar had tried to deliver his speech he collapsed in the university hallway and was rushed to a local hospital. His colleague Ekaterina Genieva recalled that "He was lying on the floor unconscious. There was blood coming from his nose; he was vomiting blood. This went on for more than half an hour". Next day he moved from the hospital to the Russian embassy's premises and arranged a transfer to Moscow where doctors familiar with his health status suggested that it looked like he was 'poisoned'.

In an interview published in the Financial Times, Gaidar claimed that it had been an attempted political murder, where "most likely that means that some obvious or hidden adversaries of the Russian authorities stand behind the scenes of this event, those who are interested in further radical deterioration of relations between Russia and the west".

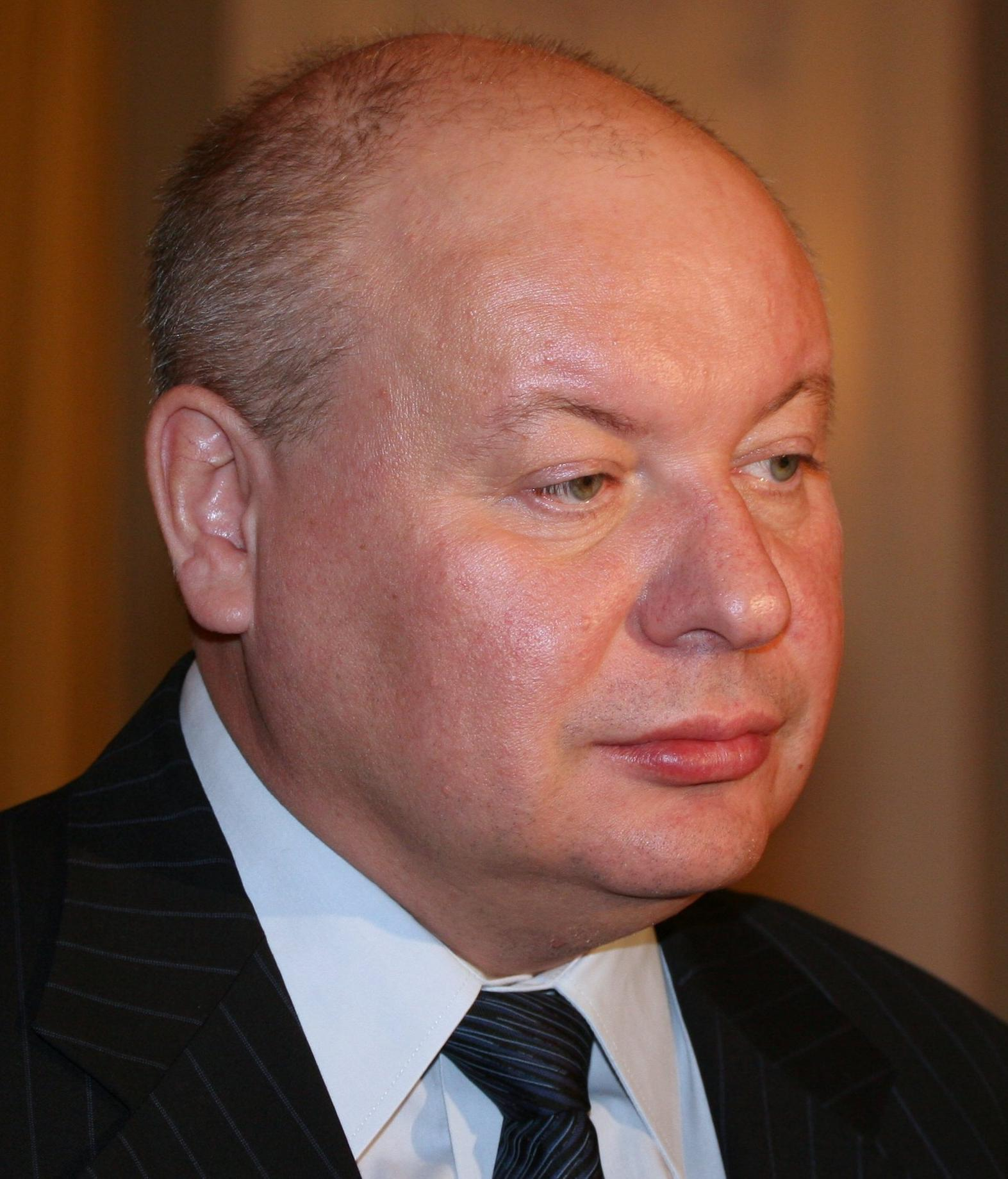
Gaidar in 2008

Anatoly Chubais, another Russian reformist official and a former colleague of Gaidar, rejected the possibility of Kremlin involvement in this case, commenting that "Yegor Gaidar was on the verge of death on 24 November. The deadly triangle – Politkovskaya, Litvinenko and Gaidar – would have been very desirable for some people who are seeking an unconstitutional and forceful change of power in Russia."

Irish police opened an official investigation of the case. One of the versions voiced by the Russian opposition leaders and Kremlin supporters suggested that Boris Berezovsky, then a Russian oligarch in exile, may have been behind it. Andrey Illarionov, a former Putin adviser now living in the US, commented that the whole case was staged, and the reason for taking Gaidar to hospital must have been hyperthensia, stress or alcohol. Though Gaidar knew Berezovsky well, that fact is described in the book The age of Berezovsky, written by Petr Aven.

== Death and legacy ==
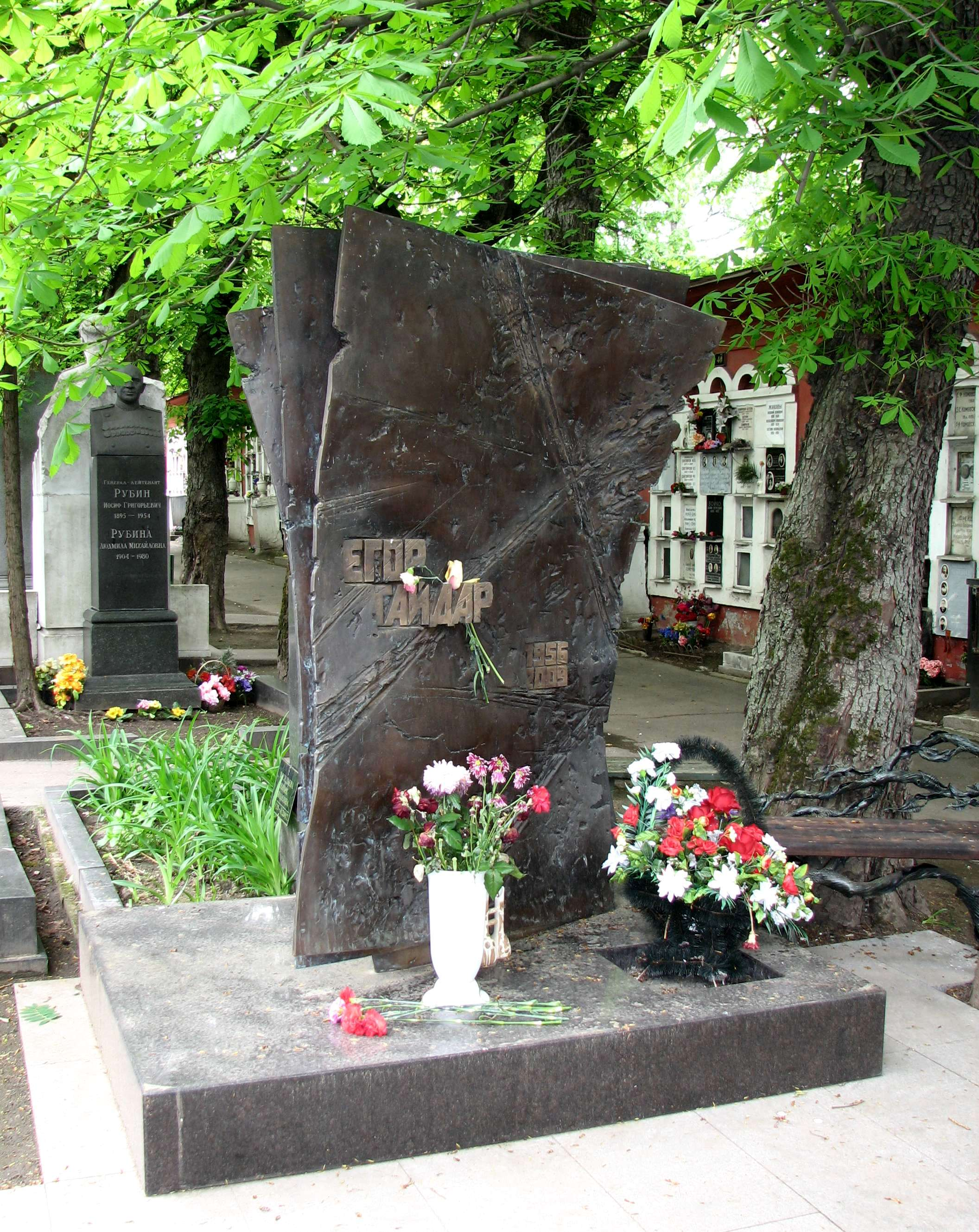
Sculptural composition on Egor Gaidar's grave. Moscow, Novodevichy Cemetery.

Gaidar died at the age of 53 in Odintsovo raion, Moscow Oblast, Russia. Gaidar's aide Valery Natarov stated that Gaidar died unexpectedly, early on 16 December 2009, at his Moscow Oblast home while he was working on a book for children. Gaidar died of pulmonary edema, provoked by myocardial ischemia. He is survived by his wife, three sons and daughter.

Gaidar was regarded as an object of loathing among ordinary Russians who lost everything during the shock therapy economic reforms, and was seen by some as "a callow theoretician with little grasp of real-life economic management". The pro-reform parties, led by Gaidar in 1993 and Chernomyrdin in 1995, were overwhelmingly rejected by voters. It is generally believed that none of Gaidar's objectives for shock therapy were achieved, and that the IMF aid was provided too late to prevent spiraling inflation. Millions of Russians were thrown into poverty due to their savings being devalued. Moreover, the privatization and break-up of state assets left over from the Soviet Union, which he played a part in, led to much of the country's wealth being handed to a small group of powerful business executives, later known as the Russian oligarchs, for much less than what they were worth. The voucher privatization program enabled these few oligarchs to become billionaires specifically by arbitraging the vast difference between old domestic prices for Russian commodities and the prices prevailing on the world market.

Russia had no currency for buying import goods, at the same time, no-one gave credits as the country was essentially bankrupt. Gaidar's supporters contend that although many mistakes were made, he had few choices in the matter and ultimately saved the country both from bankruptcy and from starvation. According to the BBC's Andrei Ostalski, "There were only two solutions—either introduce martial law and severe rationing, or radically liberalize the economy. The first option meant going all the way back to the Stalinist system of mass repression. The second meant a colossal change, a journey—or, rather, a race—through uncharted waters with an unpredictable outcome." They argued that Russia was facing total economic collapse, that a transitional depression was inevitable, and that his liberalizing reforms were better than the alternative. He was responsible for the economic shock, but did not have enough time to begin the therapy of restructuring the economy. Privatization took place mostly after he left the government and was done on principles that he did not entirely agree with. According to Franklin Foer writing in The Atlantic, "when Yegor Gaidar ... asked the United States for help hunting down the billions that the KGB had carted away, the White House refused." Gaidar considered his best achievement to be the creation of a new fiscal system in Russia from scratch within several weeks.

Russian President Dmitry Medvedev has expressed condolences to relatives and friends of Yegor Gaidar. "The death of Gaidar is a heavy loss for Russia," says Russian Prime Minister Vladimir Putin. Medvedev called Gaidar a "daring, honest and decisive" economist who "evoked respect among his supporters and opponents". "We have lost a genuine citizen and patriot, a strong spirited person, a talented scientist, writer and expert.... He didn't dodge responsibility and 'took the punch' in the most challenging situations with honor and courage," the statement said. Exiled Russian oligarch Mikhail Khodorkovsky and convicted fraudster Platon Lebedev expressed their condolences and stated that "He laid the foundation of our economy".

The White House offered condolences over Gaidar's death. U.S. National Security Council spokesman Mike Hammer said that, although controversial, Gaidar's legacy formed the foundation of a dynamic market-based economy. Jeffrey Sachs, director of Columbia University's Earth Institute, who advised the Russian government in the early 1990s, called Gaidar "the intellectual leader of many of Russia's political and economic reforms" and "one of the few pivotal actors" of the period.

== Personal life ==
Gaidar married the daughter of writer Arkady Strugatsky during his time at the university. His daughter, Maria Gaidar, was one of the leaders of the Russian democratic opposition. From July 2009 until June 2011 she was Deputy Chair of the Government of Kirov oblast. In 2015 and 2016 she was vice-governor of Odesa Oblast in Ukraine.

In addition to Russian, Gaidar was also fluent in English, Spanish, and Slovene.

=== Gaidar forum ===
In honor of Yegor Gaidar, each year in mid-January the Russian Presidency holds the Gaidar forum that attracts the Russian political and business elite, with top European politicians also attending. The forum is organized the week before the World Economic Forum in Davos and thus also serves to formulate the Russian positions on a variety of topics.

== Academic and political positions ==
=== Positions held ===
- Director of the Institute for Economy in Transition
- Executive Vice-President of the International Democratic Union (Conservative International)
- Steering Committee member "Arrábida Meetings" (Portugal)
- Member of the Baltic Sea Cooperation Council under the Prime Minister of Sweden
- Member of the Editorial Board of Vestnik Evropy (Moscow)
- Member of the Advisory Board of the Acta Oeconomica (Budapest)
- Member of the Advisory Board of the Center for Social and Economic Research Foundation (Warsaw)
- Member of the International Advisory Board of the Moscow School of Management SKOLKOVO (Moscow)

=== Honorary positions ===
- Honorary Professor, University of California, Berkeley
- Terry Sanford Distinguished Lecturer, Duke University
- Honorary Academy member of the Ukrainian National Academy of Management
- Honorary Director, Russia-Ukraine Institute for Personnel and Management

== See also ==
- Leszek Balcerowicz – architect of the shock therapy reforms in Poland

== Bibliography ==
- Russian Reform / International Money (Lionel Robbins Lectures) by Yegor Gaidar and Karl Otto Pöhl. (MIT Press) (6 July 1995), ISBN 978-0-262-07165-9
- Gaĭdar, Egor Timurovich; McFaul, Michael (1999). Days of Defeat and Victory. Jackson School Publications in International Studies. Translated by Miller, Jane Ann. University of Washington Press. ISBN 978-0-295-97823-9.
- The Economics of Russian Transition by Yegor Gaidar. (MIT Press) (15 August 2002), ISBN 978-0-262-52728-6
- State and Evolution: Russia's Search for a Free Market (Donald R. Ellegood International Publications) by Yegor Gaidar. Translated by Jane Ann Miller. (University of Washington Press) (August 2003), ISBN 978-0-295-98349-3
- Gaĭdar, Egor Timurovich (2007). Collapse of an Empire: Lessons for Modern Russia. Translated by Bouis, Antonina W. Brookings Institution Press. ISBN 978-0-815-73114-6.
- Russia: A Long View by Yegor Gaidar. Foreword by Anders Åslund. Translated by Antonina W. Bouis. (MIT Press) (12 October 2012), ISBN 978-0-262-01741-1
- Illarionov, Andrey (4 May 2011). "Трудный путь к свободе" Часть вторая [The Hard Road to Freedom Part Two] (PDF). Kontinent 2010 (in Russian) (146). Archived (PDF) from the original on 25 March 2022. "See chapter 20. Our Man in Cuba pp. 164–170"
- Medvedev, Roy Aleksandrovich; Shriver, George (2000). Post-Soviet Russia: A Journey Through the Yeltsin Era. Columbia University Press. ISBN 978-0-231-10606-1.
- Ten Years of Russian Economic Reform by Sergei Vasiliev. Foreword by Yegor Gaidar. (Centre for Research into Post Communist Economies) (25 March 1999), ISBN 978-0-948-02730-7
- Kazakevitch, Gennadi (2010). "Yegor Gaidar: Pragmatic Economist or Romantic Revolutionary?". Agenda: A Journal of Policy Analysis and Reform. 17 (1): 121–30.
- Shevchenko, Iulia (2004). The Central Government of Russia: From Gorbachev to Putin. Ashgate Publishing. ISBN 978-0-7546-3982-4.
- Shlapentokh, Vladimir (2007). "How Putin's Russia Embraces Authoritarianism: The Case of Yegor Gaidar". Communist and Post-Communist Studies. 40 (4): 493–99.
- Plokhy, Serhii (2014). The Last Empire: The Final Days of the Soviet Union. New York, NY: Basic Books. ISBN 978-0-465-05696-5.

== Citations ==
Political offices
Preceded by Igor Lazarev	Minister of Finance; 1991–1992	Succeeded by Vasily Barchuk
Preceded by Yevgeny Saburov	Minister of Economy; 1991–1992	Succeeded by Andrey Nechayev
Office established	Deputy Prime Minister of Russia for Economic Policy; 1991–1992	Succeeded by Anatoly Chubais
Preceded by Gennady Burbulis	First Deputy Prime Minister of Russia; 1992	Succeeded by Vladimir Shumeyko
Preceded by Boris Yeltsin; Acting	Prime Minister of Russia; Acting; 1992	Succeeded by Viktor Chernomyrdin
Preceded by Oleg Lobov	First Deputy Prime Minister of Russia; 1993–1994	Succeeded by Oleg Soskovets
Preceded by Oleg Lobov	Minister of Economy; Acting; 1993–1994	Succeeded by Alexander Shokhin
