= Elena Boldyreva =

Russian chemist

Elena Vladimirovna Boldyreva
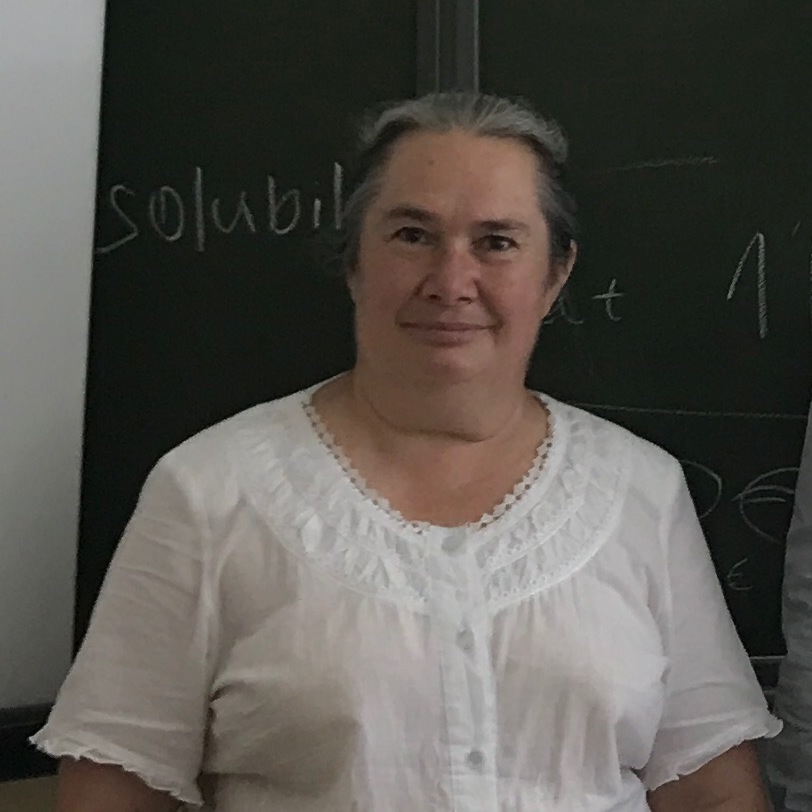
- Education: Albert Ludwig University of Freiburg
- Scientific career
- Workplaces: Novosibirsk State University; Phillips University; Durham University

Elena Vladimirovna Boldyreva (born 4 February 1961) is a Russian chemist. Boldyreva is a leading researcher at the Boreskov Institute of Catalysis in the Siberian Branch of Russian Academy of Sciences, and is Professor and Head of the Section of Solid State Chemistry at Novosibirsk State University.

== Early life and education ==
Boldyreva was born in Tomsk. She attended secondary school #130 and graduated with a gold medal in 1977. She studied at the Novosibirsk State University, and earned her bachelor's degree in 1982 and PhD in physical chemistry in 1988. Boldyreva worked at the Russian Academy of Sciences from 1980.

== Research and career ==
Boldyreva was awarded an additional Doctorate in Science in solid-state chemistry in 2000. She was promoted to Professor at the Novosibirsk State University in 2003. Her early work considered photomechanical effects in crystals of coordination complexes. She shifted into high pressure research, working with infrared spectroscopy at the Phillips University in Marburg. Boldyreva has investigated solid pharmaceutical compounds and biomimetic molecules. She also worked at Durham University as a Royal Society Fellow.

She uses high pressure measurements to investigate and control the inter- and intra-molecular interactions in crystals. She has shown you can use pressure to induce new crystalline forms, as well as interrogating chemical reactions. Alongside experimental science, Boldyreva works on Monte Carlo simulations for solid-state reactions.

She serves on the advisory council of the Russian Ministry of Education and Science.

She is an editor for Acta Crystallographica, International Union of Crystallography Research Journal, CrystEngComm Journal of Thermal Analysis and Calorimetry and Pharmalogica.

=== Awards and honours ===
Her awards and honours include;

- 2007 Award from the European Society for Applied Physical Chemistry
- 2008 Elected to the International Union of Crystallography
- 2012 Academina Women in Science
- 2017 Elected to the Slovenian Academy of Sciences and Arts
- 2018 University of Edinburgh Honorary degree of Doctor of Science
- 2018 Elected to the Academia Europaea

=== Books ===
Boldyreva, Elena (2018). Amorphous Drugs. Springer. ISBN 978-3-319-72002-9.
