= Hungarian studies =

Hungarian studies is a field of study concerned with the Hungarian language, literature, ethnology, culture, history or society.

According to the current philosophy of Hungarian Studies, all these terrains that used to be treated as separate disciplines should be studied as a whole, with the subsequent fields in relation to each other. The study encompasses the scholars in Hungary, Hungarians outside of Hungary, and foreign scholars conducting their research in other languages than Hungarian. Hungarian Studies as a discipline is intrinsically created by its intercultural circumstance from what it follows that the views and interpretations made from non-Hungarian standpoints are considered equally valid. Further, those Hungarian scholars that explore and interpret their own culture in the light of another culture inevitably apply Hungarian Studies informed standpoints.

== See also ==
- International Association for Hungarian Studies
- Hungarian Studies (journal)
