= Andrey Kolesnikov (journalist, born 1965) =

Russian journalist

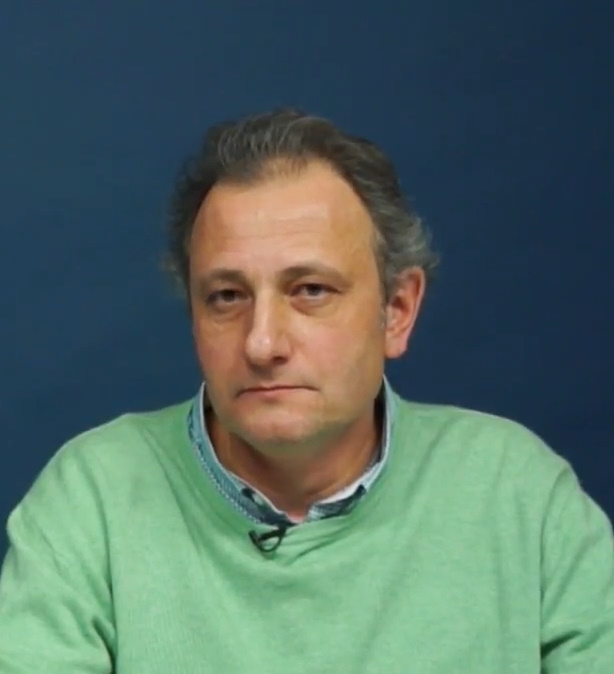
- Born: Andrey Vladimirovich Kolesnikov; 29 July 1965 (age 61); Moscow, Soviet Union
- Occupation: Investigative journalist
- Spouse: Masha Traub

Andrey Vladimirovich Kolesnikov (Russian: Андрей Владимирович Колесников) is a Russian journalist and expert on Russian politics. He is a board member of Gaidar Foundation. Before, he was a long-time senior fellow at the Carnegie Endowment for International Peace. He is also an author of a series of books about Anatoly Chubais.

He worked in Izvestia, and since 1988 he had been a deputy editor of The New Times. He is a former columnist for Vedomosti. Since 2022, Koleshnikov has been a columnist for Novaya Gazeta.

== Biography ==
Kolesnikov was born in Moscow in 1965. His father, Vladimir Ivanovich Kolesnikov (b. 1928), worked for the apparatus of the Central Committee of the Communist Party of the Soviet Union. His mother Adel Davydovna Kolesnikova (nee Traub, b. 1928), was a French language teacher. His brother, Sergey Kolesnikov, was a Kremlin speechwriter. He graduated from the Moscow State Faculty of Law in 1987.

From 1987 to 1990, he worked as a senior consultant at the judicial committee of criminal cases at the Supreme Court of the Russian SFSR.

Between 1990 and 1992, he pursued a career in journalism and worked for a publication called Dialog. From 1992 to 1993, he worked as a journalist for Russian News. Subsequently, from 1993 to 1995, he was employed as a journalist at Ogoniok magazine.

Beginning in 1995, he worked for the newspaper The New Times. Initially, he served as a journalist and later took on the role of deputy editor, gaining valuable experience in the field of journalism and media management.

In 1998, he transitioned to work for the newspaper Izvestiya. From June to September 1998, he held the position of editor of the economics department, where he likely oversaw coverage of economic matters and policies.

Following his stint as the economics department editor, from September 1998 to January 2000, Kolesnikov was appointed as the editor of politics at Izvestiya.

In January 2000, he decided to transition to a different role within the field of journalism and became a political journalist.

Twenty days after Vladimir Putin took over the presidency from Boris Yeltsin, Kolesnikov compared Putin with Mussolini. Kolesnikov remained a fierce critic of the system that Putin established.

He was awarded the Adam Smith national prize.

== Bibliography ==
- Guliev V. E., Kolesnikov А. В. Отчуждённое государство: проблемы политического и правового отчуждения в современной России. — «Манускрипт», 1998 (2-е издание — 2004). — 214 с.
- Andrei Kolesnikov, Alexander Privalov. New Russian Ideology. Хроника политических мифов. 1999—2000. — Издательство ГУ ВШЭ, 2001. — 364 с. — 3000 экз. — ISBN 5-7598-0098-1
- Andrei Kolesnikov. Neizvestnyi Chubais: Stranitsy Biografii, 2003, ISBN 978-5815903777
- Andrei Kolesnikov. Speechwriters. — «АСТ», «АСТ Москва», «Хранитель», 2007. — 336 с. — 4000 экз. — ISBN 978-5-17-041994-4, ISBN 978-5-9713-5892-3, ISBN 978-5-9762-3523-6
- Andrey Kolesnikov. Anatoliy Chubais. Biography. — «АСТ», «АСТ Москва», 2008. — 384 с. — 7000 экз. — ISBN 978-5-17-053035-9, ISBN 978-5-9713-8748-0
- (2007) "Спичрайтеры" (Speechwriters), about Kremlin speechwriters.
