= Journal of Behavioral Addictions =

Quarterly peer-reviewed academic journal

- Discipline: Clinical psychology
- Language: English
- Edited by: Zsolt Demetrovics

Publication details
- History: 2011–present
- Publisher: Akadémiai Kiadó
- Frequency: Quarterly
- Open access: Yes
- Impact factor: 7.772 (2021)

Standard abbreviations
- ISO 4: J. Behav. Addict.

Indexing
- ISSN: 2062-5871 (print); 2063-5303 (web)

Links
- Journal homepage

The Journal of Behavioral Addictions is a quarterly peer-reviewed academic journal published by Akadémiai Kiadó (Budapest, Hungary). It publishes manuscripts on the different aspects of non-substance addictions and the addictive patterns of various behaviors. The current editor-in-chief is Zsolt Demetrovics (University of Gibraltar). It was founded in 2011 by Eötvös Loránd University, and is a gold open access journal.

== Abstracting and indexing ==
The journal is abstracted and indexed in:

- Science Citation Index Expanded
- Journal Citation Reports/Science Edition
- Journal Citation Reports/Social Sciences Edition
- Social Sciences Citation Index
- Current Contents®/Social and Behavioral Sciences
- EBSCO
- Google Scholar
- PsycINFO
- PubMed Central
- Scopus
- MEDLINE
- CABI

According to the Journal Citation Reports, the journal has a 2021 impact factor of 7.772, and is ranked 26 (out of 155) in the category of Psychiatry journals (Science Citation Index Expanded).
