= Akadémiai Kiadó =

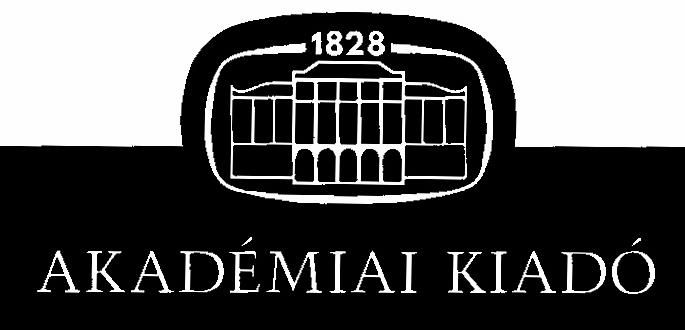
- Parent company: Wolters Kluwer and the Hungarian Academy of Sciences
- Founded: 1828; 197 years ago
- Country of origin: Hungary
- Headquarters location: Budapest
- Publication types: books, academic journals
- Official website: www.akkrt.hu

Akadémiai Kiadó (Hungarian pronunciation: [ˈɒkɒdeːmijɒji ˈkijɒdoː], lit. 'Academic publisher') is the publishing house of the Hungarian Academy of Sciences. It is one of Hungary's most important publishers of scientific books and journals. Its majority-owner is the Amsterdam-based publishing conglomerate Wolters Kluwer, while the Hungarian Academy of Sciences holds a minority share. It was founded in 1828 and is based in Budapest. It publishes monographs and journals. The branch that publishes journals is AKJournals.

== Encyclopedias ==
- Biology Encyclopedia (1975–1987)
- Akadémiai kislexikon (1989–1990)
- Academic Encyclopedia Series (2007–)—Volumes:
  - Environment (2007)
  - Psychology (2008)
  - World Religions (2009)

== Journals ==
- Across Languages and Cultures
- Acta Agronomica Hungarica
- Acta Alimentaria
- Acta Antiqua Academiae Scientiarum Hungaricae
- Acta Archaeologica Academiae Scientiarum Hungaricae
- Acta Biologica Hungarica
- Acta Botanica Hungarica
- Acta Chromatographica
- Acta Ethnographica Hungarica
- Acta Geodaetica et Geophysica Hungarica
- Acta Historiae Artium
- Acta Juridica Hungarica
- Acta Linguistica Hungarica
- Acta Mathematica Hungarica
- Acta Microbiologica et Immunologica Hungarica
- Acta Oeconomica
- Acta Orientalia Academiae Scientiarum Hungaricae
- Acta Physica Hungarica (Heavy Ion Physics)
- Acta Physica Hungarica (Quantum Electronics)
- Acta Physiologica Hungarica
- Acta Phytopathologica et Entomologica Hungarica
- Acta Veterinaria Hungarica
- Agrokémia és Talajtan (Agrochemistry and Soil Science)
- Akadémiai Értesítő
- Analysis Mathematica
- Antik Tanulmányok (Studies on Antiquity)
- Archaeologiai Értesítő (Archaeological Bulletin)
- Biologia Futura
- Central European Geology
- Cereal Research Communications
- Clinical and Experimental Medical Journal. Scientific Journal of the Markusovszky Lajos Foundation
- Community Ecology
- Developments in Health Sciences
- Építés – Építészettudomány (Architectonics and Architecture)
- European Journal of Mental Health
- European Journal of Microbiology and Immunology
- Evolution, Mind and Behaviour
- Hungarian Studies
- International Review of Applied Sciences and Engineering
- Interventional Medicine and Applied Science
- Journal of Adult Learning, Knowledge and Innovation
- Journal of Behavioral Addictions
- Journal of Flow Chemistry
- Journal of Psychedelic Studies
- Journal of Radioanalytical and Nuclear Chemistry
- Journal of Thermal Analysis and Calorimetry
- Journal of Planar Chromatography
- Learning & Perception
- Magyar Onkológia (Hungarian Oncology)
- Magyar Pszichológiai Szemle (Hungarian Psychological Review)
- Magyar Sebészet (Hungarian Journal of Surgery)
- Magyar Terminológia (Journal of Hungarian Terminology)
- MediArt
- Mentálhigiéné és Pszichoszomatika (Journal of Mental Health and Psychosomatics)
- Művészettörténeti Értesítő (Bulletin of History of Arts)
- Nanopages
- Neohelicon
- Növénytermelés (Crop Production)
- Orvosi Hetilap (Hungarian Medical Journal)
- Periodica Mathematica Hungarica
- Pollack Periodica
- Progress in Agricultural Engineering Sciences
- Psychology - journal of the Hungarian Academy of Sciences, Research Centre for Natural Sciences, Institute of Cognitive Neuroscience and Psychology
- Reaction Kinetics, Mechanisms and Catalysis
- Scientometrics
- Sleep Spindles & Cortical Up States
- Society and Economy - journal of the Corvinus University of Budapest
- Studia Musicologica
- Studia Scientiarum Mathematicarum Hungarica
- Studia Slavica Academiae Scientiarum Hungaricae
- Társadalomkutatás (Social Science Research)
