= Acta Microbiologica et Immunologica Hungarica =

- Discipline: Microbiology, immunology
- Language: English
- Edited by: Dóra Szabó

Publication details
- Former name(s): Acta Microbiologica Academiae Scientiarum Hungaricae, Acta Microbiologica Hungarica
- History: 1954–present
- Publisher: Akadémiai Kiadó (Hungary)
- Frequency: Quarterly
- Impact factor: 2.298 (2021)

Standard abbreviations
- ISO 4: Acta Microbiol. Immunol. Hung.

Indexing
- CODEN: AMIHEF
- ISSN: 1217-8950 (print); 1588-2640 (web)
- LCCN: 94640278
- OCLC no.: 909429608

Links
- Journal homepage

Acta Microbiologica et Immunologica Hungarica (AMIH) is a quarterly peer-reviewed scientific journal covering medical microbiology and immunology. It was established in 1954 as Acta Microbiologica Academiae Scientiarum Hungaricae, changing its name to Acta Microbiologica Hungarica in 1983, and obtaining its current title in 1994. The journal is published by Akadémiai Kiadó on behalf of the Hungarian Academy of Sciences. The editor-in-chief is Dóra Szabó (Semmelweis University).

== Abstracting and indexing ==
The journal is abstracted and indexed in the following bibliographic databases:

- Biological Abstracts
- BIOSIS Previews
- CAB Abstracts
- Chemical Abstracts Service
- Embase
- Global Health
- Index Medicus/MEDLINE/PubMed
- Index Veterinarius
- Referativny Zhurnal
- Scopus
- Science Citation Index Expanded
- Veterinary Science Database

According to the Journal Citation Reports, the journal has a 2021 impact factor of 2.298.
