= Maria Gaidar =

Ukrainian politician (born 1982)

Mariya Gaidar
- Мария Гайдар
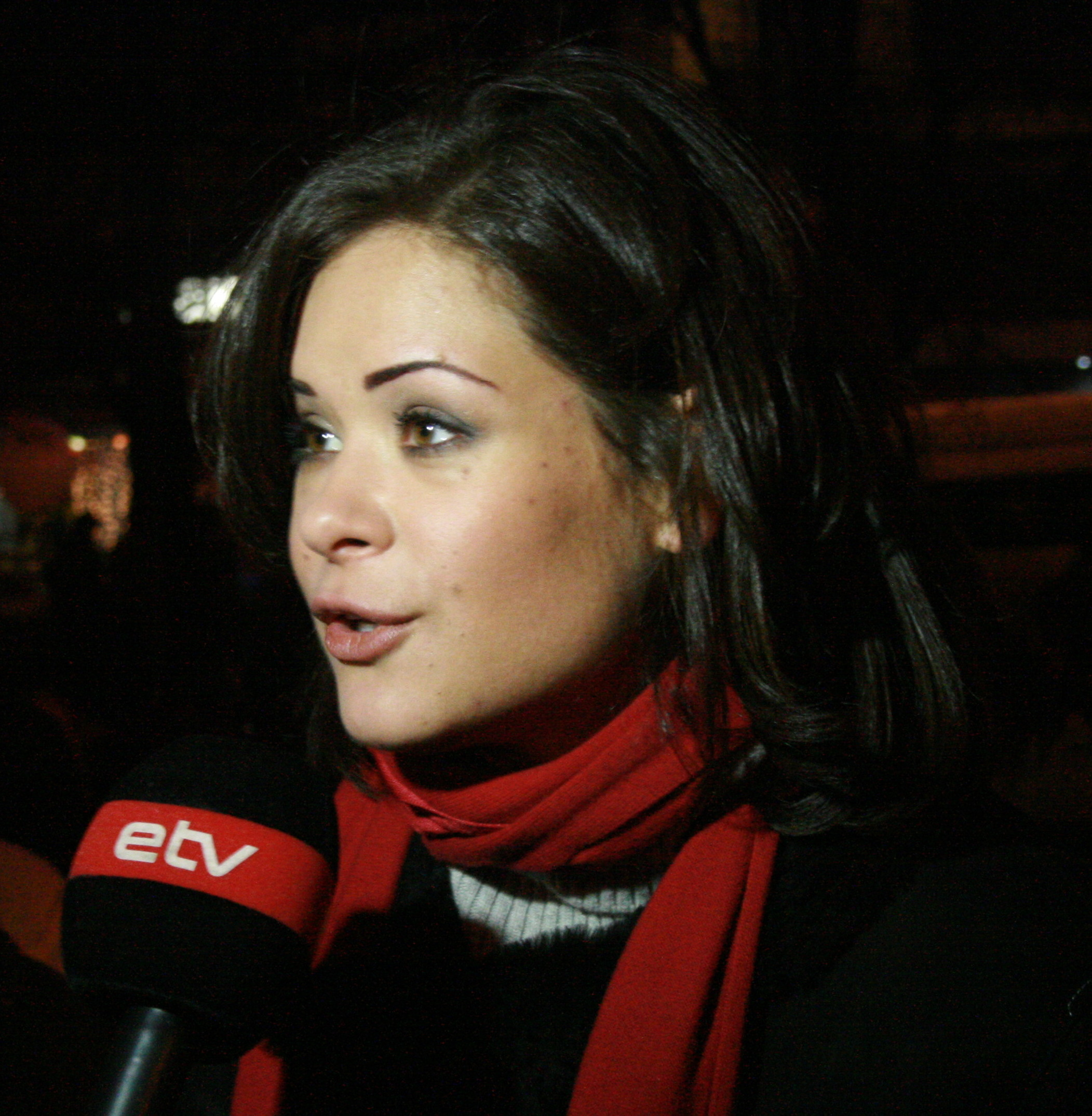
- Gaydar in 2008

Advisor to President of Ukraine
- In office 28 March 2017 – 17 May 2019
- President: Petro Poroshenko

Deputy of the Odesa Oblast of the council
- In office 30 May 2015 – 11 June 2018

Vice-Governor of Odesa Oblast
- In office 17 July 2015 – 10 May 2016
- President: Petro Poroshenko
- Governor: Mikheil Saakashvili

Deputy governor of Kirov Oblast
- In office 23 July 2009 – 8 June 2011
- President: Dmitry Medvedev
- Governor: Nikita Belykh

Personal details
- Born: Maria Yegorovna Smirnova; 21 October 1982 (age 44) Moscow, Russian SFSR, Soviet Union
- Parent(s): Yegor Gaidar; Irina Smirnova
- Education: Russian Presidential Academy of National Economy and Public Administration; Kutafin Moscow State Law University
- Occupation: politician
- Mariya Gaidar's voice Gaidar on the Echo of Moscow program, 16 August 2007

Maria Yegorovna Gaidar (Ukrainian: Марія Єгорівна Гайдар; Russian: Мария Егоровна Гайдар; Smirnova (Russian: Смирно́ва); born 21 October 1982) is a Ukrainian politician and a Russian opposition figure whose father Yegor Gaidar served as Russia's first post-Soviet Prime Minister.

Gaidar served as the Deputy Prime Minister of the Kirov region of Russia.

She founded the Social Assistance and Population Support Foundation, "Social Request".

She has served as Advisor to the Chairman of the Odesa regional state administration in social protection and health, the Deputy head of administration of Odesa region on social issues and Deputy of the Odesa regional council and external adviser to the President of Ukraine.

== Early life ==
Maria Gaidar was born in Moscow to a prominent political and literary Russian family. She is the daughter of former Russian Prime Minister, Yegor Gaidar. On her paternal side, she is a granddaughter of Soviet admiral Timur Gaidar, daughter of Leah Lazarevna Solomyanskaya and a great-granddaughter of famous Soviet writers Arkady Gaidar and Pavel Bazhov. Through Arkady Gaidar, she is a descendant of Russian aristocratic Salkova family. Through the Salkova family, she is a descendant of Mikhail Lermontov. She is step-daughter of the daughter of writer Arkady Strugatsky. Her parents divorced in 1985, when she was three years old. She stayed with her mother, Irina Smirnova. In 1991 the family moved to Toronto, Canada, where they lived for five years. In 1996 she returned to Moscow.

In 2005 Gaidar graduated summa cum laude from the Russian Presidential Academy of National Economy and Public Administration.

== Career ==
=== In Russia ===
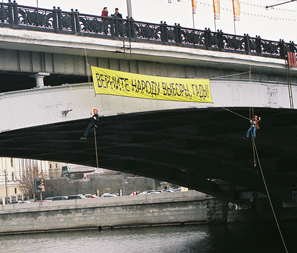
Maria Gaidar and Ilya Yashin placing a banner under the Bolshoy Kamenny Bridge, 2006

In 2005, Gaidar became founder and coordinator of the pro-democracy social youth movement "Democratic Alternative" ("Da!"). She was one of the leaders of The Other Russia organization and, following in her father's footsteps, the Union of Right Forces party. She has been a fierce critic of Putin's government and has been briefly detained for involvement in dissenters' marches and for hanging a 30ft banner from under a Moscow bridge using mountaineering gear that read "Return the elections to the people, bastards!" During the 2008 Russian presidential election, Gaidar produced numerous video materials in which Vladimir Putin was depicted as the anti-Christ leading the world to a nuclear apocalypse.

In February 2009, Gaidar became an advisor to the new governor of Kirov Oblast, Nikita Belykh, and on 23 July she was confirmed as a deputy governor in Kirov Oblast. In June 2011, Gaidar announced that she would resign as adviser due to her admission to Harvard University. In December 2012, she became an adviser to Moscow Deputy Major for Social Affairs Leonid Pechatnikov. In November 2013, she resigned from the Government of Moscow. On 16 July 2015, Gaidar founded the Social Assistance and Population Support Foundation, "Social Request", a non-profit organization. In 2015, she threatened to renounce her Russian citizenship, planning to become an Israeli citizen under the Law of Return and to move to Israel. However, she subsequently said that she wished to retain her Russian citizenship, and to keep three citizenships – Russian, Ukrainian and Israeli.

=== In Ukraine ===
On 17 July 2015, Gaidar accepted an offer from Mikheil Saakashvili and became a vice-governor of Odesa Oblast in Ukraine. Her practical work has been as a fixer combating fraud and ensuring that vital social functions run smoothly. She received Ukrainian citizenship on 4 August 2015. This she described in September 2015 as "It didn't feel good at all....But for me to be here, now, and to be here completely, it's important." A few days after her appointment Gaidar stated she wants to retain her Russian citizenship, adding "In the future I hope that Russia will be a democratic country and it will be possible to go back and work there." Ukrainian law prohibits dual citizenship and only Ukrainian citizens can serve as appointed public officials. Gaidar has indicated she would be willing to serve on Saakashvili's team as an adviser or volunteer (functions open to foreigners).

On 20 July, she believed that annexation of Crimea is illegal, and should be returned to Ukraine, but doesn't know how can it be done.

Various Russian public figures criticized Gaidar's decision: Russian politician, Vitaly Milonov, requested an investigation of Maria Gaidar for high treason, the leader of the Liberal Democratic Party of Russia, Vladimir Zhirinovsky, proposed forbidding Gaidar from returning to Russia, while Russia's Commissioner for Human Rights, Ella Pamfilova, announced that the Russian government would freeze grants to Gaidar's charity Sotsialny Zapros. Sotsialny Zapros itself stated that Gaidar had already stepped down as the organization's head the previous week and that the NGO had voluntarily and formally already refused all government grants.

In the October 2015 Odesa regional election Gaidar was elected into the Odesa Oblast parliament for Petro Poroshenko Bloc. Gaidar resigned as deputy governor after a new law barring a regional lawmaker being simultaneously a civil servant took effect on 1 May 2016. Gaidar resigned her seat in Odesa Oblast's legislature on 10 June 2018, the assembly unannounced on June 12 that it had relieved Gaidar of her duties as a lawmaker at her request.

On 5 April 2017 Gaidar was appointed an adviser of Ukrainian President Petro Poroshenko.

== Personal life ==
Gaidar is fluent in English, German, Spanish and her native Russian. In 2011, she was admitted to Harvard University for a Mid-Career Masters in Public Administration, where she studied for 8 months. In 2014 she graduated from Kutafin Moscow State Law University.

Gaidar has one daughter. In 2014 she and her daughter moved to Israel because she was afraid that she would lose custody of the child if a criminal investigation into Gaidar were to be launched in Russia.

After having lived and worked in Ukraine for seven years Gaidar and her daughter relocated to Israel in March 2022 following the 24 February 2022 Russian invasion of Ukraine (via Poland, as part of the stream of refugees following the invasion).
