= Hungarian Studies (journal) =

- Discipline: Hungarian studies
- Language: English, French, German
- Edited by: Andrea Seidler

Publication details
- History: 1985-present
- Publisher: Akadémiai Kiadó (Hungary)
- Frequency: Biannually

Standard abbreviations
- ISO 4: Hung. Stud.

Indexing
- ISSN: 0236-6568 (print); 1588-2772 (web)
- LCCN: 85653858
- OCLC no.: 310826636

Links
- Journal homepage

Hungarian Studies is a biannual peer-reviewed academic journal covering Hungarian studies. It was established in 1985 and is the official journal of the International Association for Hungarian Studies. The founding editor-in-chief is Mihály Szegedy-Maszák, while the current editor-in-chief is Andrea Seidler.

The journal is abstracted and indexed by Scopus.
