= Acta Mathematica Hungarica =

- Discipline: Mathematics
- Language: English
- Edited by: Imre Bárány

Publication details
- Former name(s): Acta Mathematica Academiae Scientiarum Hungaricae
- History: 1950–present
- Publisher: Springer Science+Business Media
- Frequency: 16/year
- Impact factor: 0.979 (2021)

Standard abbreviations
- ISO 4: Acta Math. Hung.
- MathSciNet: Acta Math. Hungar.

Indexing
- CODEN: AMAHE9
- ISSN: 0236-5294 (print); 1588-2632 (web)
- LCCN: 83646315
- OCLC no.: 09938525

Links
- Journal homepage

Acta Mathematica Hungarica is a peer-reviewed mathematics journal of the Hungarian Academy of Sciences, published by Akadémiai Kiadó and Springer Science+Business Media. The journal was established in 1950 and publishes articles on mathematics related to work by Hungarian mathematicians.

Its 2009 MCQ was 0.39, and its 2015 impact factor was 0.469. The editor-in-chief is Imre Bárány, honorary editor is Ákos Császár, the editors are the mathematician members of the Hungarian Academy of Sciences.

== Abstracting and indexing ==
According to the Journal Citation Reports, the journal had a 2021 impact factor of 0.979. This journal is indexed by the following services:

- Science Citation Index
- Journal Citation Reports/Science Edition
- Scopus
- Mathematical Reviews
- Zentralblatt Math
