= Evolution, Mind and Behaviour =

- Discipline: Evolutionary psychology, evolutionary anthropology, human behavioral ecology
- Language: English
- Edited by: Gayle Brewer (editor-in-chief), Lisa DeBruine, Clark Barrett, Sandra Virgo

Publication details
- History: 2002–present
- Publisher: Akadémiai Kiadó
- Open access: Yes

Standard abbreviations
- ISO 4: Evol. Mind Behav.

Evolution, Mind and Behaviour is an open access journal focusing on "the application of evolutionary theory to the human behavioral sciences". The journal publishes both empirical and theoretical papers. The authors come from a variety of disciplines including anthropology, psychology and human behavioral ecology.

The journal is published by Akadémiai Kiadó. It was previously known as Journal of Cultural and Evolutionary Psychology and Journal of Evolutionary Psychology. It is indexed in Scopus.
