= International Association for Hungarian Studies =

The International Association for Hungarian Studies is a body supporting research and education relating to Hungarian language, culture and society, founded in 1977. As one of its major tasks the association sees the enhancing of cooperation between institutions and forums that contribute to the study of Hungarian Studies in Hungary and worldwide. The association acquaints itself with Hungarian studies-related activities and renders accessible this information. The association has a publication series of its own, which undertakes the publication of articles and monographs and publishes the journal Hungarian Studies. The Congress of Hungarian Studies, organized every five years, brings together 400–500 scholars worldwide. In addition to the congresses, the association organizes several conferences in between the congresses, mainly with the purpose of supporting the doctoral education within Hungarian Studies. Through these conferences the association provides a forum for doctoral students in and outside Hungary.
