= Journal of Thermal Analysis and Calorimetry =

- Discipline: Physical chemistry
- Language: English
- Edited by: I.M. Szilágyi

Publication details
- History: 1969–present
- Publisher: Springer Science+Business Media on behalf of Akadémiai Kiadó
- Frequency: Bimonthly
- Open access: Hybrid open-access journal
- Impact factor: 4.755 (2021)

Standard abbreviations
- ISO 4: J. Therm. Anal. Calorim.

Indexing
- CODEN: JTACF7
- ISSN: 1388-6150 (print); 1588-2926 (web)
- LCCN: sn98023100
- OCLC no.: 41973453

Links
- Journal homepage; Online archive

The Journal of Thermal Analysis and Calorimetry is a bimonthly peer-reviewed scientific journal published by Springer Science+Business Media on behalf of Akadémiai Kiadó. It was established in 1969 as the Journal of Thermal Analysis, obtaining its current title in 1998. The journal covers all aspects of calorimetry, thermal analysis, and experimental thermodynamics. The editor-in-chief is I.M. Szilágyi (Budapest University of Technology and Economics).

== Abstracting and indexing ==
The journal is abstracted and indexed in:

- Chemical Abstracts Service
- Current Contents/Physical, Chemical & Earth Sciences
- EBSCO databases
- Ei Compendex
- Index Islamicus
- Inspec
- ProQuest databases
- Science Citation Index Expanded
- Scopus

According to the Journal Citation Reports, the journal has a 2021 impact factor of 4.755.
