= Gaidar forum =

Yearly economic conference held in Russia

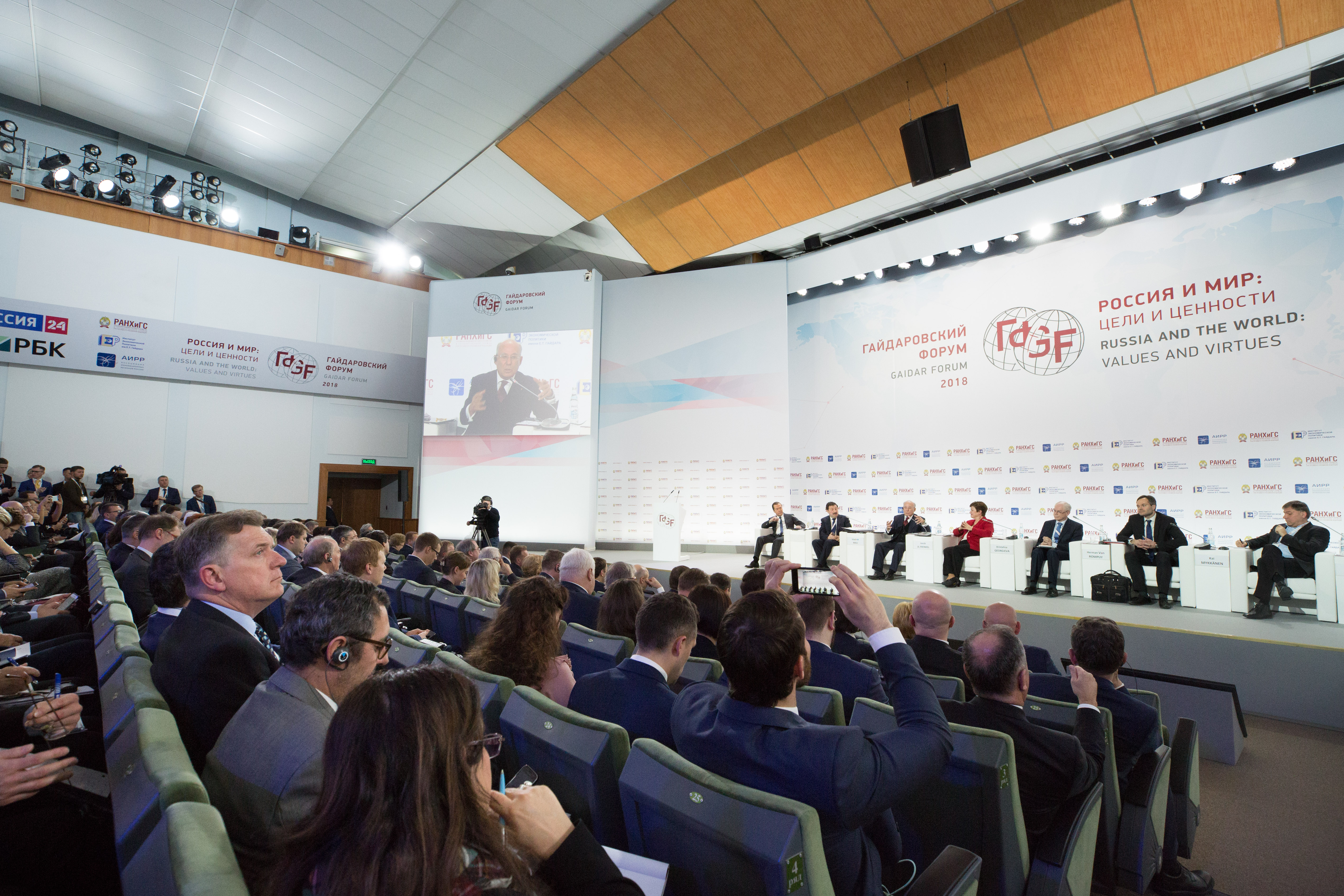

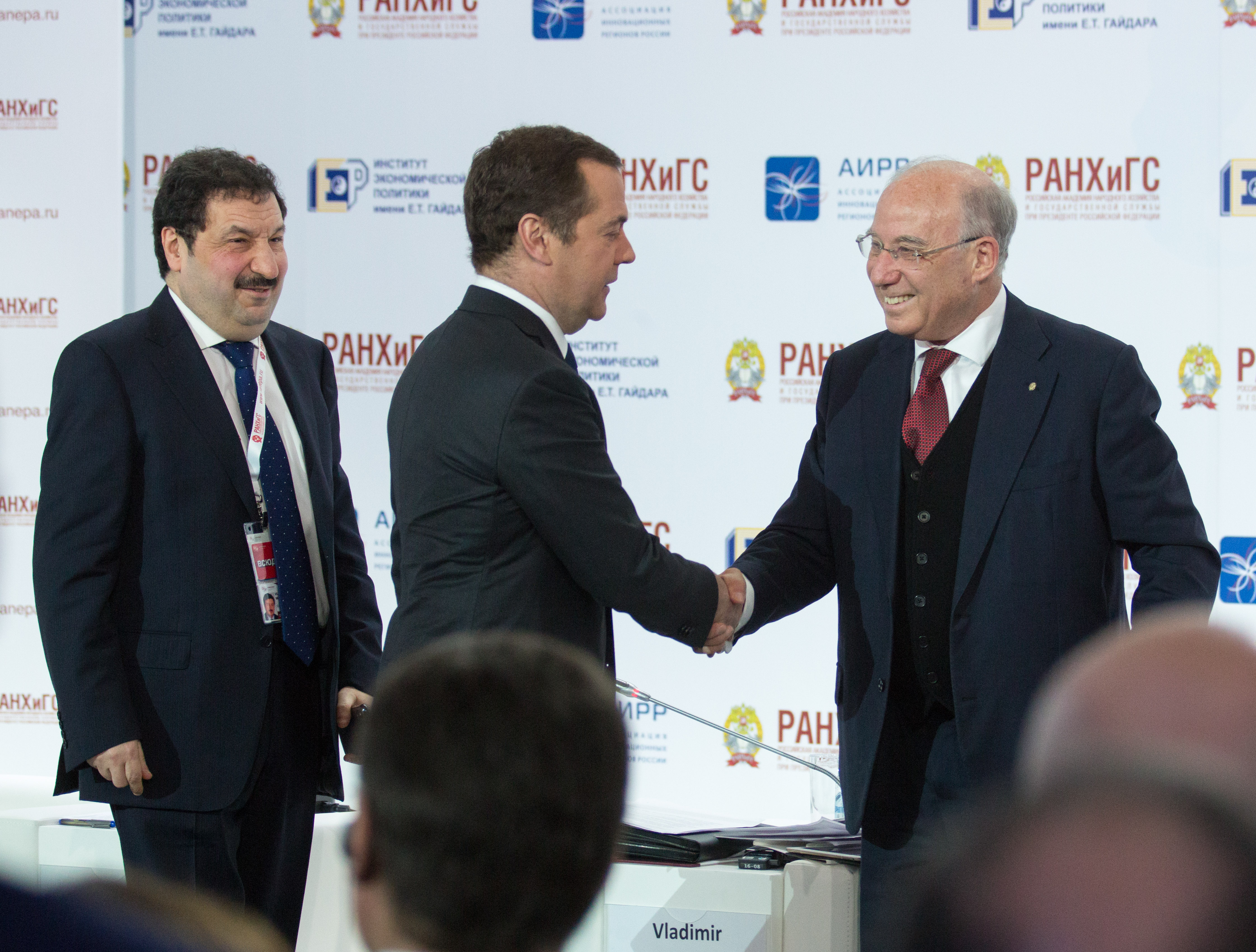

Gaidar forum (Russian: Гайдаровский форум) is a yearly international scientific and practical conference in Russia in the sphere of economy. It is being held in 2010-2022. It is named after the Russian liberal reformist Yegor Gaidar.

The venue of the forum is the Russian Presidential Academy of National Economy and Public Administration, chairman of the forum in 2018 was the former First Deputy Prime Minister of the Russian Federation Igor Shuvalov.

In 2019, in accordance with the instructions of the Prime Minister of the Russian Federation Dmitry Medvedev, the organizing committee of the Forum will be headed by the First Deputy Prime Minister - Minister of Finance of the Russian Federation Anton Siluanov.

Ideologically, the Gaidar forum is the counterpart of the Moscow Economic Forum.

According to the Swedish economist Anders Åslund, at the forum it is not customary to discuss problematic questions of the Russian economy and economic policy. Among such questions, Åslund names the absence of private property in Russia.
