= Acta Oeconomica =

Academic journal

- Discipline: Economics
- Language: English
- Edited by: Péter Mihályi

Publication details
- History: 1966-present
- Publisher: Akadémiai Kiadó
- Frequency: Quarterly
- Open access: Hybrid
- Impact factor: 0.939 (2021)

Standard abbreviations
- ISO 4: Acta Oecon.

Indexing
- ISSN: 0001-6373 (print); 1588-2659 (web)
- LCCN: 72626282
- JSTOR: 00016373
- OCLC no.: 567441129

Links
- Journal homepage

Acta Oeconomica is a quarterly peer-reviewed academic journal published by Akadémiai Kiadó. It covers theoretical and general issues related to the East European and Hungarian transition processes, economic policy, econometric methods, and economic modelling.

The journal was established in 1966 by the Hungarian Academy of Sciences and first appeared in Budapest under the full title Acta Oeconomica: Periodical of the Hungarian Academy of Sciences, issued by the academy's Institute of Economics. It is a hybrid open-access journal. The editor-in-chief is Péter Mihályi (Corvinus University of Budapest).

== Abstracting and indexing ==
The journal is abstracted and indexed in:

- EconLit
- GEOBASE
- Index Islamicus
- International Bibliography of the Social Sciences
- Referativny Zhurnal
- Research Papers in Economics
- Scopus
- Social Sciences Citation Index

According to the Journal Citation Reports, the journal has a 2021 impact factor of 0.939, ranking it 326 out of 379 journals in the category "Economics".
