= Communist Women's International =

Organization for advancing communist ideas among women (1920–1930)

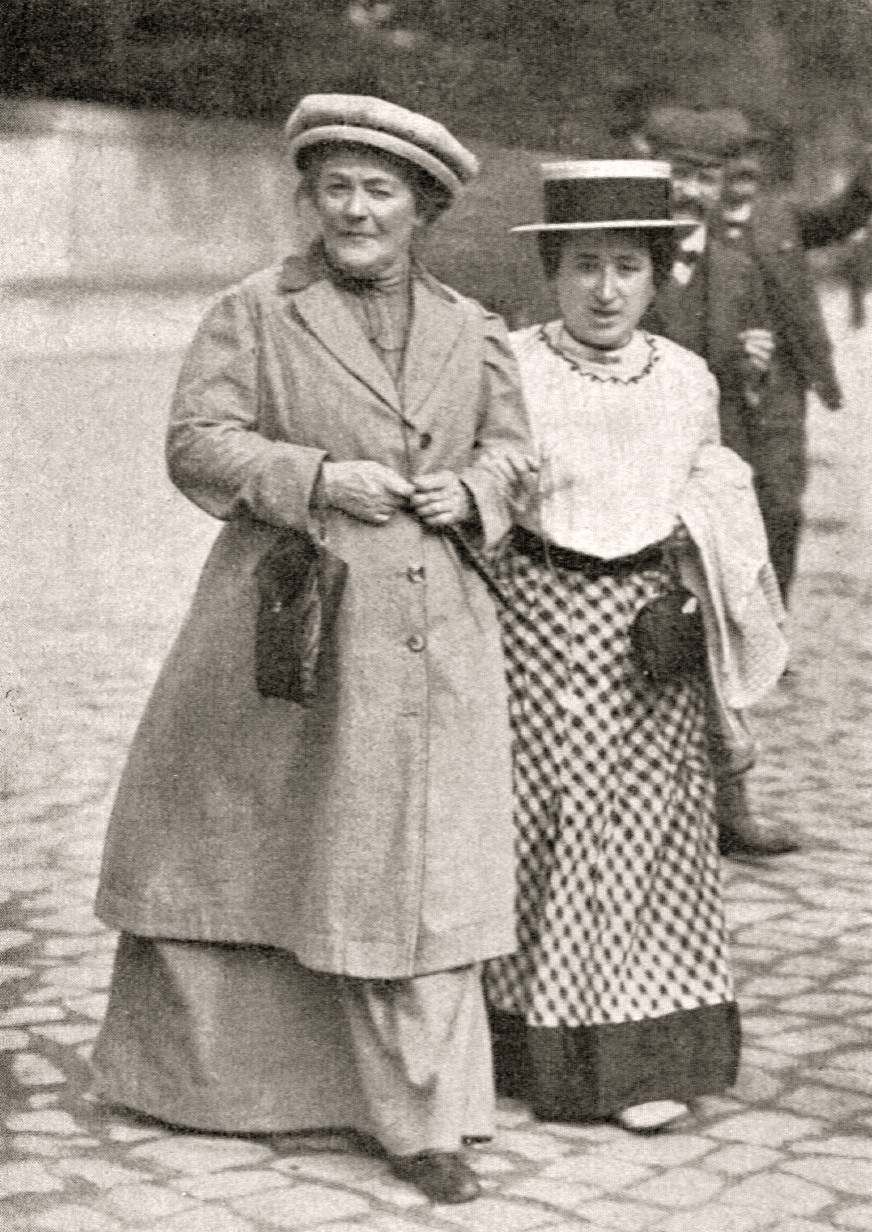
Veteran German Marxist Clara Zetkin (left) was the first head of the Communist Women's International.

The Communist Women's International was launched as an autonomous offshoot of the Communist International in April 1920 for the purpose of advancing communist ideas among women. The Communist Women's International was intended to play the same role for the international women's movement that the Red Peasant International played for poor agrarians and the Red International of Labor Unions played for the international labor movement.

Operations of the Communist Women's International was directed by a body known as the International Communist Women's Secretariat. This body was renamed the Women's Section of the Executive Committee and made a subordinate department of the Executive Committee of the Communist International (ECCI) and its magazine terminated in May 1925.

While the Women's Department (Zhenotdel) of the Russian Communist Party had some success in mobilizing Soviet women for administrative tasks in Soviet Russia, the Communist Women's International and the Communist Women's Secretariat ultimately proved a failure outside the borders of the Soviet Union. The Women's Section of the Executive Committee was terminated by ECCI in August 1930, as was the Russian Party's Zhenotdel, ending the Comintern's employment of a specific structure for propaganda to women.

== Organizational history ==
=== Establishment ===
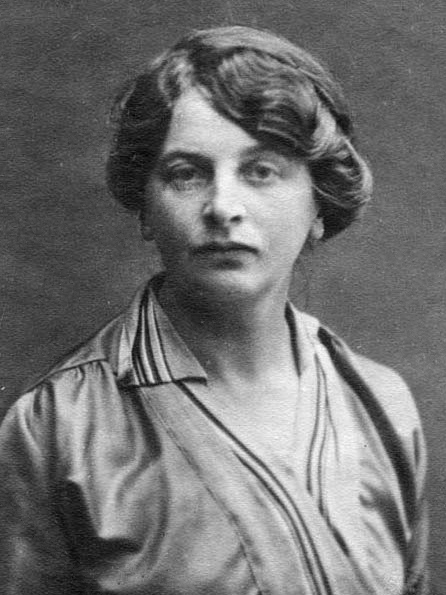
The French-born Inessa Armand was a leading figure at the 1915 and 1920 International Women's Conferences of the Second and Third Internationals, respectively. (1916 photo)

The Second International, which predated the Communist International by nearly three decades, was founded upon the principles of political and social equality between men and women. The various national socialist parties included the participation of women despite their being denied the right to vote in many places and women's suffrage was made an important programmatic goal of the late 19th Century and early 20th Century radical movement. A special conference of socialist women was convened in Bern, Switzerland in 1915, bringing together such key international socialist leaders as Alexandra Kollontai, Inessa Armand, and Clara Zetkin to share common experiences and set common agendas.

Less than 18 months after the Russian Revolution of November 1917, a new Communist International (Comintern) was established in Moscow in an attempt to supersede the moribund Second International, which had been effectively shattered by World War I. A parallel effort was made to reorganize the revolutionary socialist women of Europe and America. This took the form of the Communist Women's International, headed by an institution known as International Communist Women's Secretariat, established in Moscow by the Comintern in April 1920.

The International Women's Secretariat was conceived as a small directing circle of half a dozen members or fewer. Ultimately eight women were named to the body, including six Russians — Kollontai, Lenin's wife Nadezhda Krupskaya, Lyudmila Stal, Zlata Lilina, Konkordia Samoilova, and a woman known to history only as Similova — as well as the Dutch Henriëtte Roland-Holst and Rosa Bloch from Switzerland. Secretary of the organization was the veteran German revolutionary Clara Zetkin.

An International Conference of Communist Women was convened from July 30 to August 2, 1920 in Moscow, concurrent with the ongoing 2nd World Congress of the Comintern.

Delegates heard details of the system of so-called "delegates' meetings" conducted in Soviet Russia which brought together assemblies of elected female representatives of factories and villages in an effort to mobilize them on government administrative tasks and to build female participation in village and factory soviets as well as the Russian Communist Party.

=== Development ===
At the beginning of 1922 headquarters of the Communist Women's International was moved from Moscow to Berlin.

Clara Zetkin represented the International Women's Secretariat for Communist work among women at the 4th World Congress of the Comintern, held in Moscow in the fall of 1922, delivering her report on Monday, May 27, 1922. Zetkin acknowledged that the Secretariat conducted its work under the "immediate direction and leadership" of the Executive Committee of the Communist International, governing body of the Comintern. Zetkin singled out for particular praise the Communist women's movements in Bulgaria and Germany, which had established special women's committees for work among women, claiming that these groups had "become a force" in those nations. In Poland and Great Britain, on the other hand, no such organizations had been established, with these parties instead insisting on integration of their female members into regular party organizations. Work among women had consequently suffered, Zetkin charged.

Zetkin highlighted International Women's Day (March 8) as on the chief activities of the Communist women's movement, characterizing the day of international demonstrations as "a party campaign, a declaration of war by communism against capitalism, a beginning of the struggle for which an army of millions of exploited and oppressed must be gathered, armed, and made ready." Zetkin also noted the important place played by female activists in the International Workers' Aid for Soviet Russia campaign of fundraising for famine relief. Echoing Zetkin, Hertha Sturm of Germany called for increased organization of women workers in factories and trade unions and again singled out the Bulgarian organization for special praise in this regard.

The 4th World Congress officially endorsed Zetkin's views in the resolution which it adopted, lauding the efficacy of "special structures" for female communist party members, such as national women's secretariats, and remarking that "unfortunately, some sections have failed partially or completely to carry out their duty to systematically promote Communist work among women" by failing to create such "indispensable" institutions.

=== Official organ ===
The Communist Women's International published a bimonthly magazine called Die Kommunistische Fraueninternationale (The Communist International of Women). A total of 25 issues of the journal were produced during its five years of existence, running from 1921 to 1925. In all, some 1300 pages of content were published in the pages of this magazine.

Die Kommunistische Fraueninternationale included articles dealing with the women's movement from around the world as well as coverage of the handling of women's issues in Soviet Russia. Chief on the agenda for the publication and for the organization behind it was an ongoing effort to promote International Women's Day as a worldwide revolutionary holiday as well as to build multinational support for the International Red Aid organization. Other matters of emphasis included agitation against militarism, fascism, and price inflation, as well as education in support of women's reproductive rights.

Member parties of the Communist International also issued magazines targeted to a female readership in this period, including Compagna (Woman Comrade), a publication of the Communist Party of Italy, and De Voorbode (The Herald), a periodical issued by the Communist Party of the Netherlands. Czechoslovakia had no fewer than three periodicals targeted to women — the Czech-language Kommunistka (Woman Communist), the similarly named German organ Kommunistin, published for Sudetenland, and the regional publication Žena (Woman).

=== Reorganization ===
On May 15, 1925, the Executive Committee of the Communist International decided to reorganize the Communist women's movement. The International Women's Secretariat was henceforth to be formally known as the Women's Section of the Executive Committee, according to this ECCI resolution. This change was to be unpublicized, however, with the same decision cravenly declaring that "in presentations to a general audience it is good, for tactical reasons, to preserve the name International Women's Secretariat." At the same time ECCI suspended publication of the official organ of the Women's Section, Die Kommunistische Fraueninternationale, ostensibly for financial reasons.

Headquarters for the reorganized Communist women's movement were moved from Berlin to Moscow in 1926 as part of the decision to downgrade the semi-autonomous status of the former International Women's Secretariat.

Late in the spring of 1926 a fourth international of the communist women's movement was held in Moscow. Whereas the previous gatherings had been known somewhat grandiosely as "Conferences of Communist Women," the 1926 session was to be known as the 4th "International Conference on Work Among Women" — an alteration meant to further reflect the reduced stature of the Women's Section in the Comintern's bureaucratic hierarchy.

The 4th Conference was attended by just 18 voting and 47 non-voting delegates. The gathering tightly controlled by the representatives of ECCI Palmiro Togliatti and Ottomar Geschke, who chaired the opening and closing of the proceedings. Also determining the course of the proceedings were the disciplined body of delegates from the Soviet Union who, in the words of historian E.H. Carr, "dominated the debates and confidently laid down the line for others to follow and imitate." The ultimate purpose of the gathering, in Carr's estimation, was to "establish the authority" of ECCI and the Women's Secretariat over the activities of communist women outside the USSR.

The Soviet system of "women's delegate meetings" — agitational gatherings of non-party women — was again a matter of emphasis, as well as the question of whether communist parties should found new women's organizations with largely non-communist memberships. A decision to impose the Soviet model of women's delegate meetings seems to have been made in advance of the conference. Despite the lack of conviction of the concept's applicability outside of the specific conditions of the USSR, no formal challenge was made to the resolution calling for the system's implementation. Similarly, approval of the formation of mass organizations including non-party women was endorsed despite the report of German delegates of negative experience in this regard, in which the new organizations stood in opposition to the regular women's section of the Communist Party of Germany.

=== Dissolution ===
While in the USSR a numerically powerful communist women's movement emerged under the Russian Communist Party's Women's Department (Zhenotdel), organization of women workers in other parties around the world was frequently given short shrift relative to other activities of the communist parties affiliated with the Comintern.

A final conference was organized by the Women's Secretariat in August 1930 which brought together the chiefs of Women's Sections of the Communist Parties of Europe and the United States. The conference was chaired by Ruth Overlakh, head of the Women's Section of the Communist Party of Germany. In accord with the return to the radical rhetoric and policies of the so-called Third Period, Overlakh emphasized the need for women to engage in "special tasks" such as physically intervening in the transport of strikebreakers across picket lines.

ECCI was determined to further lessen the place of specific appeals to women at this time, however, and two plenipotentiaries were dispatched to the meeting — exiled Finnish Communist leader Otto Kuusinen and Boris Vassiliev. Vassiliev announced that the Women's Section had proven itself incapable of locating and training female strike leaders and activists or developing women for physical resistance to police violence or strikebreakers and must therefore be dissolved immediately without further discussion.

Elimination of the All-Union Communist Party's Zhenotdel also took place in 1930. Despite the termination of the Soviet and international organizations, Women's Sections remained in some Communist Parties for several years after this date, but the scope of activity of these organizations was reduced and their existence deemphasized.

== International Communist Women's Conventions ==
Convention	Location	Date	Comments
1st International Conference of Communist Women	Moscow	July 30 – August 2, 1920	
2nd International Communist Women's Congress	Moscow	June 1921	Attended by 82 delegates from 28 countries. Resolutions in Die Kommunistische Fraueninternationale, vol. 1, no. 5/6 (1921), pp. 203–212.
Conference of International Women Correspondents	Berlin	January 1922	Delegates from 9 countries and representatives of International Women's Secretariat. Account in Die Kommunistische Fraueninternationale, vol. 2, no. 3/4 (March–April 1922), pp. 477–487.
3rd International Conference of Communist Women	Moscow	1924	
4th International Conference for Communist Work Among Women	Moscow	May 29 – June 10, 1926	Total of 18 voting and 47 consultative delegates.
Conference of Women Attending 10th Anniversary Festivities	Moscow	November 1927	Characterized by historian Jean-Jacques Marie as a "purely ornamental conference" of tourists. (Marie, "The Women's Section of the Comintern", pg. 281.)
Conference of Heads of Communist Party Women's Sections	Moscow	August 1930	Final conference organized by Women's Secretariat.

== See also ==
- Young Communist International
- Profintern
- Zhenotdel
- Kommunistka
- International Women's Day
- International Socialist Women's Conferences
- Women's International Democratic Federation
- Socialist International Women

== Works cited ==
- Carr, E. H. (1964). A History of Soviet Communism. Vol. 8: Socialism in One Country, 1924–1926: Volume 3, Part 2. London: Macmillan.
- Carr, E. H. (1976). A History of Soviet Russia. Vol. 12: Foundations of a Planned Economy, 1926–1929, Volume 3, Part 1. London: Macmillan.
- Riddell, John, ed. (2012). Toward the United Front: Proceedings of the Fourth Congress of the Communist International, 1922. Leiden, Netherlands: Brill.
  - Zetkin, Clara; Sturm, Hertha; Smidovich, Sofia; Kasparova, Varsenika; Murphy, John Thomas. "Communist Work among Women". In Riddell (2012).
- Riddell, John (January–February 2013). "The Communist Women's Movement, 1921–1926". International Socialist Review. 87.
