= Women in the Russian Revolution =

The Russian Revolutions of 1917 saw the end of the Russian Empire, a short-lived provisional government, and the creation of the world's first socialist state under the Bolsheviks. They made explicit commitments to promote the equality of men and women. Many early Russian feminists and ordinary Russian working women actively participated in the Revolution, and all were affected by the events of that period and the new policies of the Soviet Union.

The provisional government that took power after the February 1917 overthrow of the tsar promoted liberalism and made Russia the first major country to give women the right to vote. As soon as the Bolsheviks took power in October 1917, they liberalized laws on divorce and abortion, decriminalized homosexuality, and proclaimed a new higher status for women. Inessa Armand (1874–1920), Alexandra Kollontai (1872–1952), Nadezhda Krupskaya (1869–1939) and Aleksandra Artyukhina (1889–1969) were prominent Bolsheviks. Outside the Bolsheviks, Maria Spiridonova emerged as one of the main leaders of the Left Socialist-Revolutionaries and generally of the peasant movement: she chaired the Extraordinary All-Russia Congress Of Soviets Of Peasants' Deputies in late November 1917, and was later appointed head of the Peasant Section of the Central Executive Committee of the All-Russian Soviet of Workers', Peasants', and Soldiers' Deputies (VTsIK) until July 1918.

== Russian Women and World War I ==
The young Russian feminist movement was exhilarated by the uprising of 1905, which was followed by a liberalization of some of the tight restrictions on women, and the creation of a national parliament. However, by 1908, the forces of reaction were pushing back hard, and feminists were in retreat. Women were barred from universities, and there was a general sense of despair among liberal forces.

The outbreak of war in August 1914 was a surprise; the Empire was poorly prepared. As men were hurriedly put into uniform by the millions women took on new roles. The number of women workers in industrial centers rose to over one million as 250,000 women joined the workforce between 1914 and 1917. Peasant women also took on new roles, taking over some of their husbands' farm work. Women fought directly in the war in small numbers on the front lines, often disguised as men, and thousands more served as nurses. The social conditions of women during World War I affected the role they played in coming revolutions.

=== Under the Provisional Government ===
In the spring of 1917, the Russian Ministry of War authorized the creation of sixteen separate all-female military formations. Four were designated as infantry battalions, eleven slated as communications detachments and a singular naval unit. Already some women had successfully petitioned to join regular military units, and with the planning of the Kerensky Offensive, a number began pressing the new Provisional Government to create special women's battalions. These women, along with a number of high-ranking members of the Russian government and military administration, believed that female soldiers would have significant propaganda value, their example revitalizing the weary and demoralized men of the Russian army. Simultaneously, they hoped the presence of women would shame hesitant male soldiers into resuming their combat duties.

== The February Revolution and its impact on the Bolshevik party ==
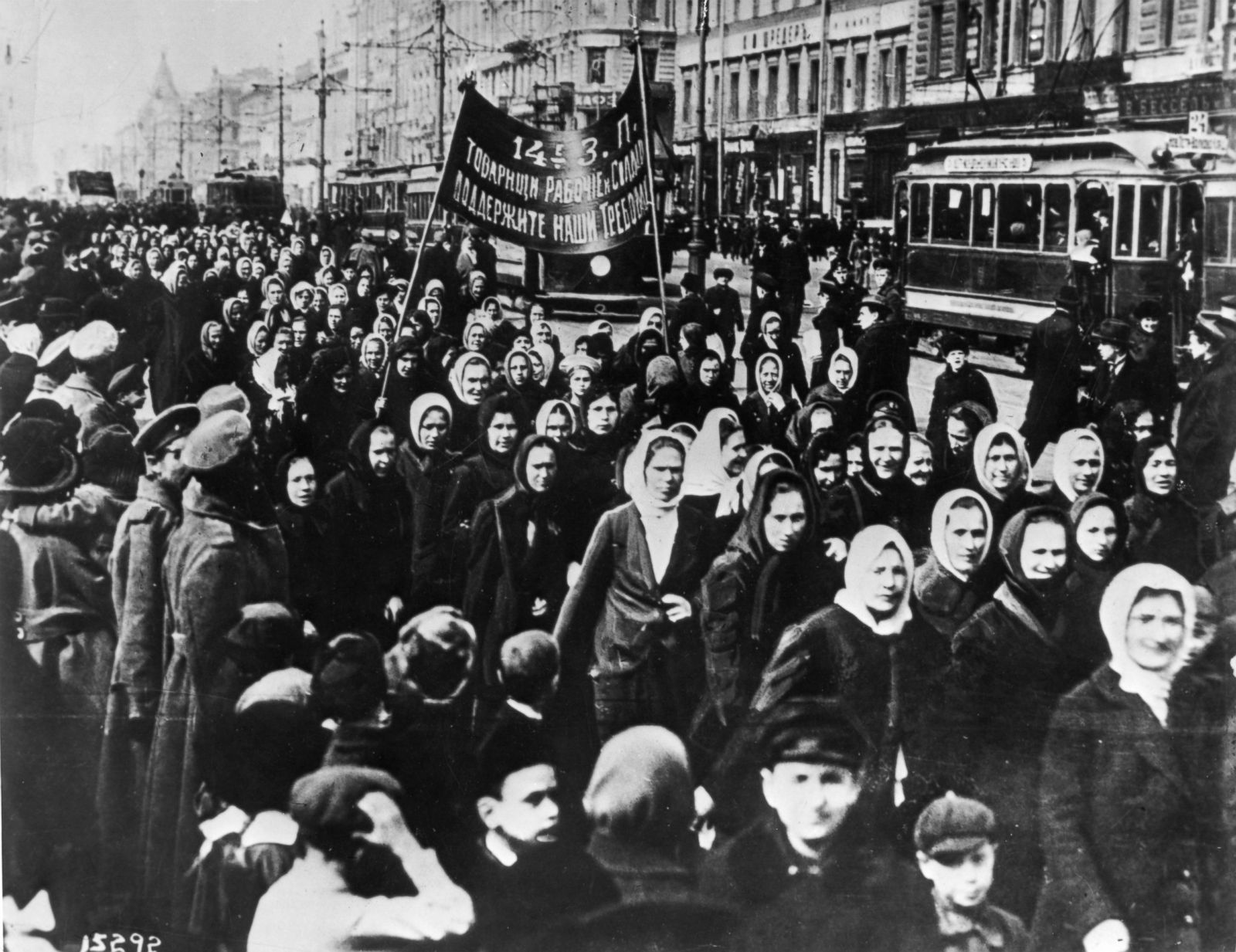
The 1917 International Women's Day March held in Petrograd

The February Revolution toppled the tsarist regime and established a provisional government. A few women were highly visible in this revolution, especially those who gathered in mass protest on the International Women's Day to call for political rights. They gained rights under the provisional government, including the right to vote, to serve as attorneys, and equal rights in civil service. Women advocating for these kinds of political rights generally came from upper and middle-class background, while poorer women protested for "bread and peace." Record numbers of women joined the Russian army. All women's combat units were put into place, the first of these forming in May 1917.

== The Women Questions and Bolshevik politics ==
The Women Question, and the notion that women were locked into strict social rules and roles, was a popular topic among Russian intellectuals during the late 19th and early 20th centuries. In sharp contrast to the West, however, the Russian discussions regarding the rights and roles of women did not form part of the basic struggle for human rights. Barbara Engel has explored the ways the revolution was gendered. The weakness of the cult of domesticity in the Imperial era facilitated the introduction of innovative Bolshevik policies. On the other hand working class was gendered as male, which impeded innovations. Indeed, after 1905 radical elements increasingly conceptualized women as locked out of the public sphere where only men were legitimate participants, revolutionaries must prioritize men and often ridiculed housewives and peasant women. As a consequence, reformers and revolutionaries generally viewed women as backward and superstitious, and not to be trusted politically. Some Marxists referred to women workers as the "most backward stratum of the proletariat" and accused them of being unable to develop a revolutionary consciousness without party guidance. Many wrote and theorized on the issue, but many Russians associated the issue mainly with feminists. Before the revolution, feminism was condemned as "bourgeois" because it tended to come from the upper classes, and was considered counterrevolutionary because of the perception that it would have divided the working class. Engels' 1890 work on The Women Question influenced Lenin heavily. He believed that the oppression of women was a function of their exclusion from the public production sphere and the relegation to the domestic sphere. For women to have been considered true comrades, the bourgeois family had to be dismantled and women needed full autonomy and access to employment. In light of the participation of women in the February Revolution, the Bolshevik Party began to rethink and restructure its approach to "the women question." Stalin reversed many of the Bolshevik wartime innovations, and he also set up a system that for some women was empowering.

The Bolsheviks had opposed any division of the working class, including separating men and women to put some focus specifically on women's issues. They thought men and women needed to work together with no division, and because of this, in the party's early days, there was no literature printed specifically targeting women, and the Bolsheviks refused to create a bureau for women workers. In 1917, they acquiesced to the demands of the Russian feminist movement and created the Women's Bureau.

== October Revolution and the Civil War ==
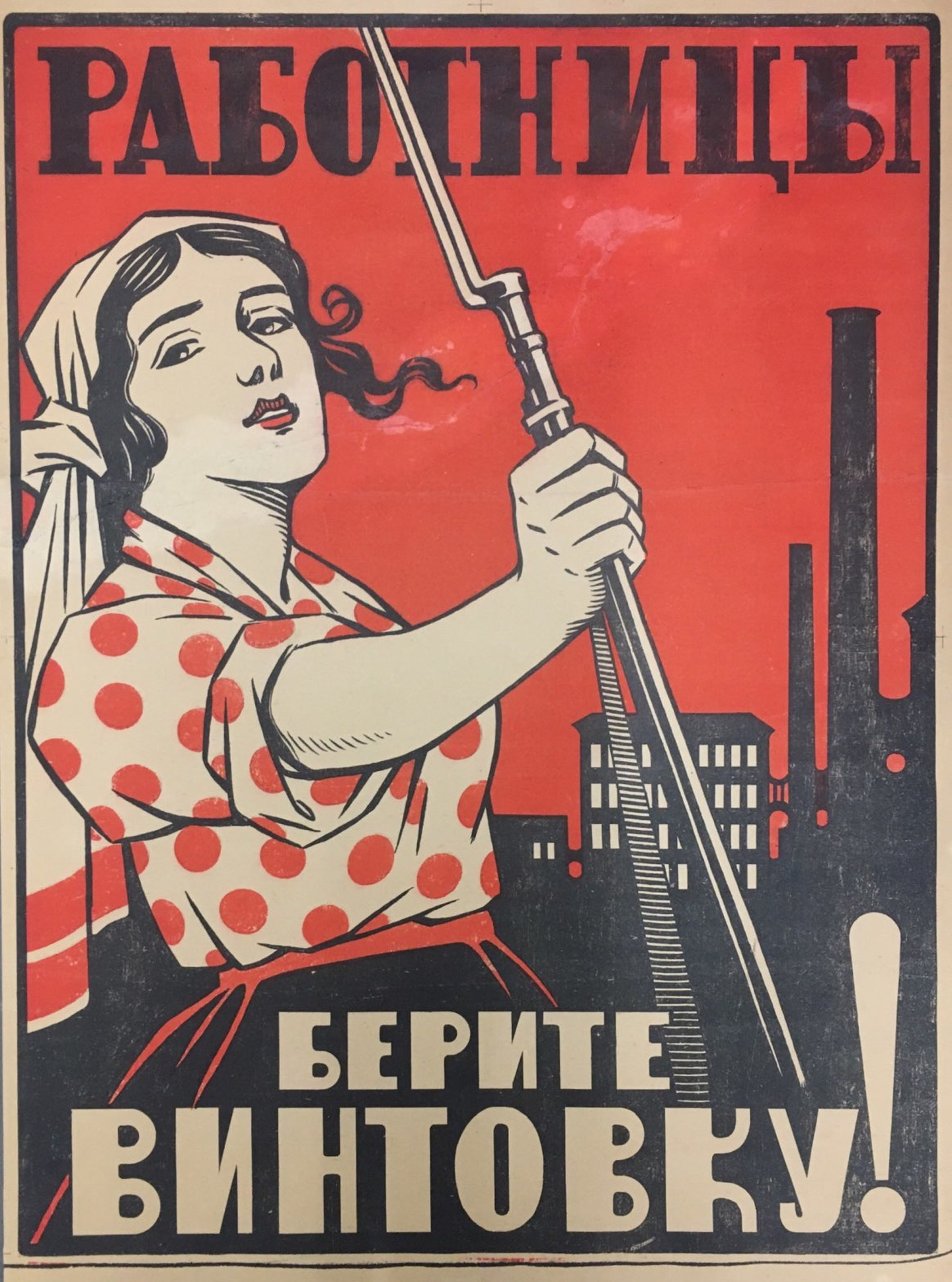
"Female workers, take the rifle!"

Beginning in October 1918, the Soviet government enacted a series of social reforms that included the liberalization of divorce and abortion laws, the decriminalization of homosexuality, and the legalization of cohabitation outside marriage.These policies were part of a broader Bolshevik effort to reshape family structures and gender roles in line with socialist ideals. While these reforms expanded personal freedoms, they also led to significant shifts in family life, including higher divorce rates and a decline in birth rates during the 1920s. As the Soviet leadership increasingly prioritized industrial growth and viewed population trends as strategically important, women's roles in the labor force became a central policy concern. By the mid-1930s, under Joseph Stalin, many earlier reforms were reversed in favor of a more conservative, pronatalist agenda that emphasized motherhood, family stability, and demographic growth.

The Bolsheviks came to power with the idea of liberation of women and transformation of the family. They were able to equalize women's legal status with men's by reforming certain laws such as the Code on Marriage, the Family, and Guardianship ratified in October 1918 which allows both spouses were to retain the right to their own property and earnings, grant children born outside wedlock the same rights as those born within, and made divorce available upon request. The Bolsheviks launched a movement for women's self-activity; the Zhenotdel, also known as women's section of the Communist Party (1919–1930). Under the leadership of Alexandra Kollontai, and with the support of women like Inessa Armand and Nadezhda Krupskaya, the Zhenotdel spread the news of the revolution, enforced its laws, set up political education and literacy classes for working-class and peasant women, and fought prostitution.

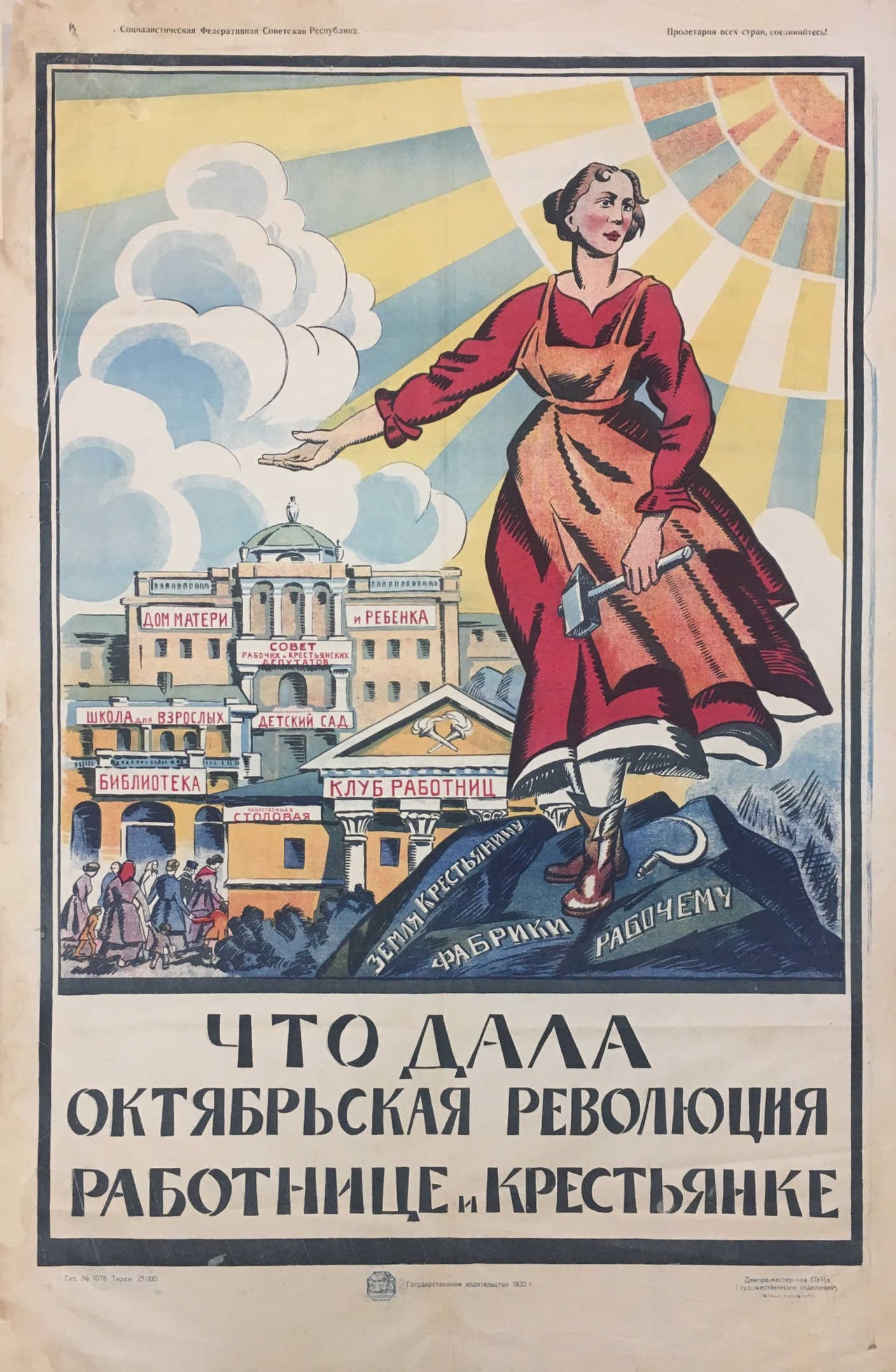
What the October Revolution gave to the female worker and peasant. 1920 Soviet propaganda poster. The inscriptions on the buildings read "library", "kindergarten", "school for grown-ups", etc.

While men were forcibly conscripted for service in the civil war when multiple enemies tried to overthrow the Bolsheviks, women were not required to participate. Nevertheless, they did, in large numbers, suggesting the Bolsheviks had gained some women's support. About 50,000 to 70,000 women joined the Red Army by 1920 to make up 2% of the overall armed forces.

During this time Bolshevik feminism really began to take form. Lenin spoke often of the importance of relieving women from housework so they could participate more fully in society, and an effort to pay workers for household chores began. The principle "Equal pay for equal work" was officially legislated. Some changes to the traditional emphasis on family were implemented, including making divorce easily attainable and granting full rights to illegitimate children.

One former revolutionary fighter, Fanni Kaplan, attempted to assassinate Vladimir Lenin in 1918, but was arrested and executed. Lenin never fully recovered his health.

Some women, like Anarchist Maria Nikiforova and Left Socialist-Revolutionary Irina Kakhovskaya, respectively conducted military operations and terrorist actions in Ukraine during the Civil War, the latter leading to the assassination of the German Military Governor, Field Marshal Hermann von Eichhorn.

=== Inessa Armand ===
Inessa Armand (1874–1920) was an active revolutionary who was very close to Lenin; she was given major roles after he assumed power. She became head of the Moscow Economic Council and served as an executive member of the Moscow Soviet. She became director of Zhenotdel, an organisation that fought for female equality in the Communist Party and the Soviet trade unions (Zhenotdel operated until 1930), with powers to make legislative decisions. She drove through reforms to allow women rights to divorce, abort, participate in government affairs and create the facilities like mass canteens and mother centers.

In 1918, with Sverdlov's assistance against opposition from Zinoviev and Radek, Armand succeeded in getting a national congress of working women held, with Lenin as a speaker. According to Elwood, the reason the party leadership agreed to back up Armand's agitation for communal facilities was that the Civil War required enlisting women into factory work and auxiliary tasks in the Red Army, which created the need to release women from traditional duties. Armand also chaired the First International Conference of Communist Women in 1920. The spring of 1920 saw the appearance, again on Armand's initiative, of the journal Kommunistka, which dealt with "the broader aspects of female emancipation and the need to alter the relationship between the sexes if lasting change was to be effected".

== Peasant Women and Women's Emancipation ==
While scholarship highlights the active role of urban working-class women in catalyzing the February Revolution and shaping subsequent Soviet policy through figures such as Alexandra Kollontai and Inessa Armand, this level of mobilization was largely absent in the countryside. The perceived indifference of peasant women toward the Bolshevik and feminist movements is better understood as a form of social resistance rooted in the defense of the traditional village structure. Patriarchal norms were not simply a cultural preference, but the foundation of rural economic life, making the disruptive, state-led emancipation efforts of the era seem fundamentally misaligned with the interests of rural women. Historians have theorized that peasants saw revolution as a dangerous threat to their way of life, and that peasant women, already impoverished, feared the disruptions brought by war. Only a small minority of peasant women joined the Bolshevik cause. Peasant women's rejection of women's emancipation is most clearly demonstrated in their refusal to be involved with the Women's Bureau.

== See also ==
- Outline of the Russian Revolution and Civil War
- Bibliography of the Russian Revolution and Civil War
- Bibliography of Stalinism and the Soviet Union
- Index of Old Bolsheviks
- Index of articles related to the Russian Revolution and Civil War
- Inessa Armand
- Alexandra Kollontai
- Kommunistka
- Nadezhda Krupskaya
- Irina Kakhovskaya
- Olga Kameneva
- Clara Zetkin
- Rosa Luxemburg
- Larissa Reissner
- Soviet women in World War II
- Maria Spiridonova
- Elena Stasova
- Varvara Yakovleva
- Rosalia Zemlyachka
- Women in Russia
- Women in the Russian and Soviet military
- Gender roles in post-communist Central and Eastern Europe
- Zhenotdel
