= Klavdiya Nikolayeva =

Russian revolutionary, trade unionist, feminist and Soviet politician

- Клавдия Николаева
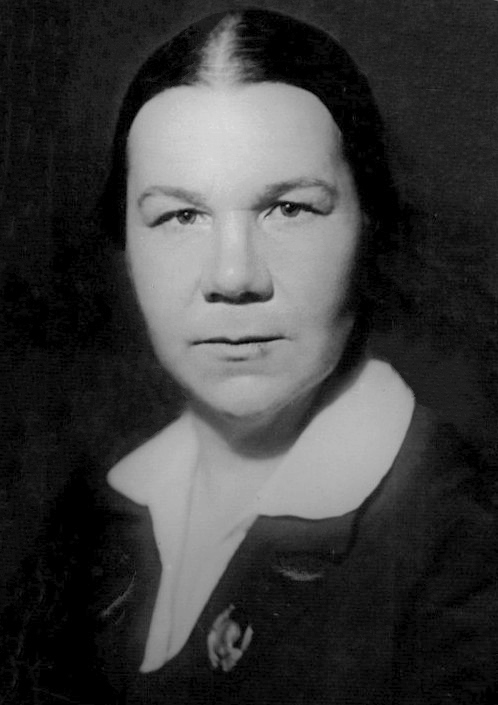
- Nikolayeva in 1938

Personal details
- Born: 13 June 1893 Saint Petersburg, Russian Empire
- Died: 17 December 1944 (aged 51) Moscow, Russian SFSR, Soviet Union: Russian (1893–1922); Soviet (1922–1944)
- Party: RSDLP (Bolsheviks)(1909–1918); Russian Communist Party (1918–1944)
- Occupation: trade unionist, writer, editor, politician

Klavdiya Ivanovna Nikolayeva (Russian: Клавдия Ивановна Николаева; 13 June 1893 – 28 December 1944) was a Russian revolutionary, trade unionist, feminist, Old Bolshevik and Soviet politician. She was the second woman elected to the Bolshevik Secretariat (13th term), serving as a Candidate Member.

== Early life ==
The daughter of a Saint Petersburg labourer and a laundress, Nikolayeva worked as a nanny from an early age. After finishing elementary education she worked in a printing house, where her activism began. She wrote for the journal Rabotnitsa (Working Woman). She was arrested for the first time in 1908, at the age of 15, being arrested three more times by tsarist authorities and exiled twice.

== Pre-revolution Bolshevik activism ==
She became a member of the Russian Social Democratic Labour Party (RSDLP) in 1909, and was a Bolshevik, while also engaging in work within the printing union. While exiled in the village of Kazatchinskoe, in the Yeniseysky District, she was appointed head of the local RSDLP committee.

== Revolutionary and politician ==
After the February Revolution, she returned to Petrograd (Saint Petersburg) and became editor of Rabotnitsa, 'which played crucial role in organizing women and rallying them to Bolshevik Party'. She participated in the October Revolution. From 1918 she headed the women's section of the Petrograd branch of the Communist Party of the Soviet Union (CPSU), as well as its department of agitation and propaganda.

She chaired the First Conference of Working Women. In 1924 she became head of the Zhenotdel (the women's department of the Secretariat of the Central Committee of the Communist Party of the Soviet Union), after Alexandra Kollontai and Sofia Smidovich.

She was close to the United Opposition and Grigory Zinoviev, whom she openly supported at the 15th Congress of the All-Union Communist Party (Bolsheviks). With Zinoviev's failure against Stalin, she lost her job in the Zhenotdel, but maintained activity within the party. In 1928 she headed the department of agitation and propaganda of the North Caucasus Committee. From 1930 to 1933, she was a member of the Organisational Bureau of the CPSU Central Committee, heading the department of agitation and mass campaigns. Following this, she became deputy secretary of the regional committees of the West Siberian Krai Party (1933) and Ivanovo Oblast.

From 1936 she was secretary of the Central Trade Union Council. She was a member of the Central Committee of the Communist Party of the Soviet Union from 1924 to 1925 and, from 1934, a member of the Central Executive Committee of the Soviet Union; Member of the Supreme Soviet from 1937 to 1944; and member of the Supreme Soviet's Praesidium from 1938 to 1944.

== The Second World War ==
During the Second World War, she organized the preparation of nurses and health personnel, the evacuation of children, sponsorship of Red Army units by professional unions, and paramedical institutions. While returning to Murmansk from a political visit to the United Kingdom her convoy was bombed by the Germans and Nikolayeva helped rescue the wounded.

She died on 28 December 1944. During her life she was awarded the Order of Lenin along with other medals. The urn containing her ashes is kept in the Kremlin Wall Necropolis in Red Square in Moscow.

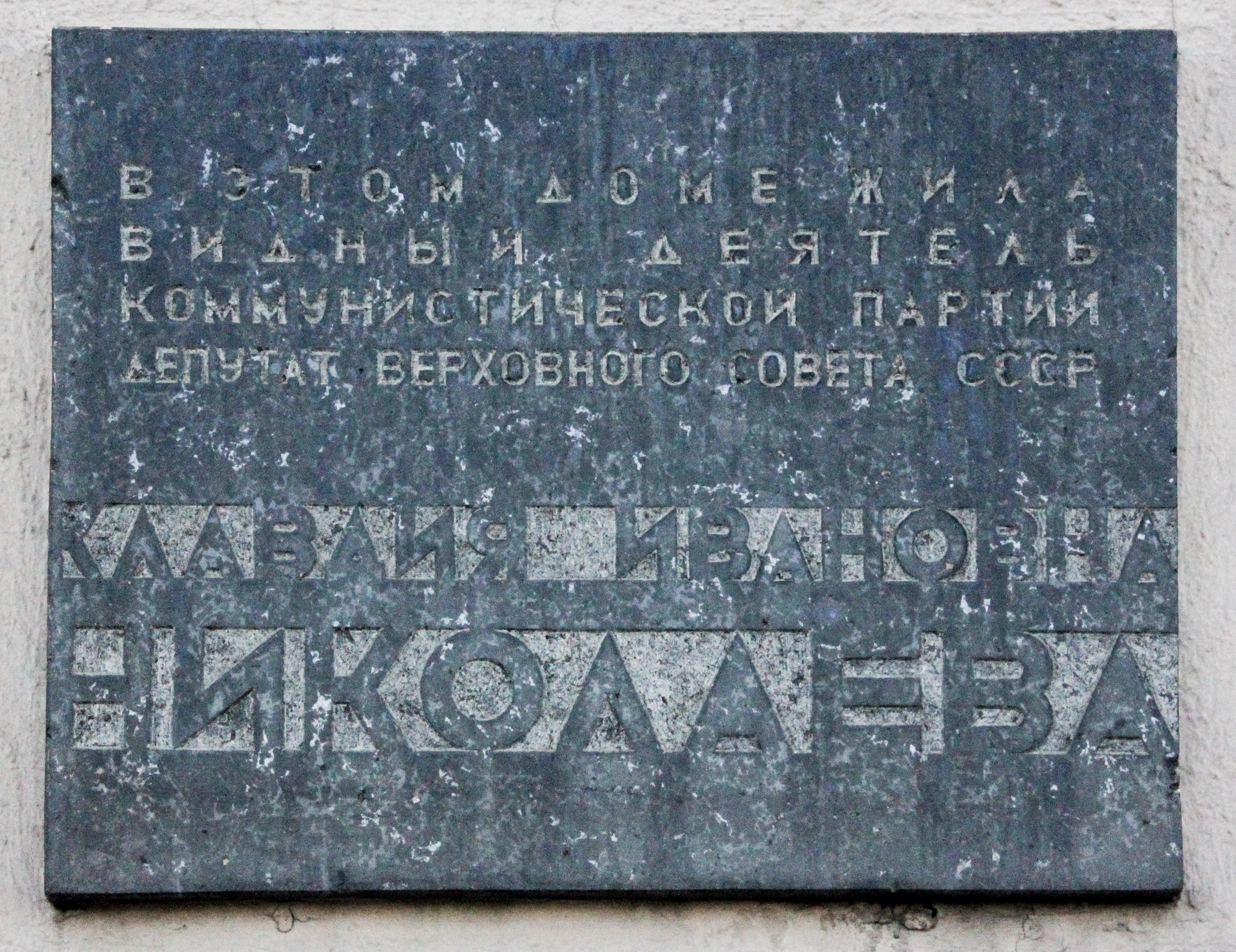
Commemorative plaque. Text reads: 'In this building lived a remarkable CPSU politician, a member of Supreme Soviet: Klavdiya Ivanovna Nikolayeva'

== Works ==
In addition to her articles in The Worker, Klavdiya Nikolayeva wrote two books on the role of women in the construction and defence of the Soviet Union:

- The Communist Party and the action among women (1925)
- The Great Patriotic War and the Soviet Woman (1941)

== See also ==
- Zhenotdel
- History of feminism
- Women in the Russian Revolution
