= Soviet Woman (magazine) =

Soviet magazine

- Categories: Fashion, feminism
- Frequency: Bimestrial until 1954; Monthly until 1991
- Founded: 1945
- Final issue: 1991
- Country: Soviet Union
- Based in: Moscow
- Language: Russian, English, French, German, Chinese, Spanish and others

Soviet Woman (in Russian, Советская женщина; transliterated in English: Sovetskaya zhenshchina) was a sociopolitical and literary illustrated magazine, founded in Moscow in 1945 by the Committee of Soviet Women with the support of the unions.

It was first published in December 1945 in the Soviet Union. It had a bimestrial edition until 1954 when it became monthly until its disappearance in 1991.

The magazine was published in several languages and distributed in various countries.

The magazine aimed to inform about different aspects of soviet women's lives, such as their participation in building the communist society, or the problems facing the international feminist movement. They also published articles on fashion, economics, or the achievements of soviet science, especially about medicine and pedagogy, as well as literary and artistic works.

As of 1991, the magazine was published under the name Woman's World (Мир женщины).

== See also ==
- Kommunistka
- Rabotnitsa
- Zhenotdel
