= Konkordiya Samoilova =

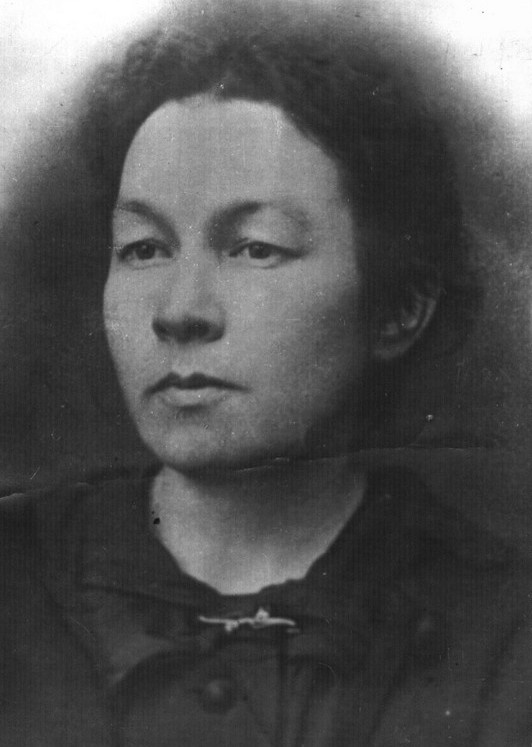
- Born: Konkordiya Nikolavna Gromova; 1876; Irkutsk
- Died: June 3, 1921 (aged 44–45); Astrakhan
- Occupations: Revolutionary, activist

Konkordiya Nikolavna Samoilova (née Gromova) (Russian: Конкордия Николаевна Самойлова; 1876 – June 3, 1921) was a Bolshevik revolutionary and a founding editor of the Russian newspaper, Pravda, in 1912. She was a revolutionary and activist for women workers both before and after the Bolshevik Revolution. She devoted her life to the cause of proletarian women. Feeling strongly as a Communist, she sometimes used the name "Natasha Bolshevikova".

== Early life and education ==
Samoilova's father was an Orthodox priest in Irkutsk, Siberia, and she had a sister, Kaleriia.

Samoilova graduated with a gold medal from gymnasium in Irkutsk. She took part in her first demonstration in February 1897 while a university student, studying Bestuzhev Courses in St. Petersburg. In 1901, she was expelled from school after three months in prison. She returned home to Irkutsk until early 1902, when she received a passport and left for Paris to study Marxism at the Vol'naaia Russkaia shkola obshchestvennykh nauk (Free Russian School of Social Sciences) where the lecturers included Vladimir Lenin and Julius Martov and eventually joined their newspaper Iskra as a journalist.

== Career ==
In 1903, she joined the Russian Social Democratic Labour Party (bolsheviks) or RSDLP(b). She was arrested four times between 1902 and 1913, and spent a year in prison. At the First All-Russian Women's Congress in November 1918, she sat on the podium with Inessa Armand, Alexandra Kollontai, and Klavdiia Nikolaeva. In 1912, she was a founding editor, and secretary of the editorial board, of the newspaper, Pravda. She later joined the editorial staff of Rabotnitsa.

== Personal life ==
She met Arkadi A. Samoilov in 1906 and they married in 1913. They had two children. The husband died in 1919 of typhoid fever, while Konkordiia died in 1921 of cholera in Astrakhan.
