= Lenin...The Train =

- Created by: Michael Pearson (book)
- Directed by: Damiano Damiani
- Music by: Nicola Piovani
- Countries of origin: Italy; West Germany; France; Austria; Spain
- Original language: English
- No. of episodes: 2

Production
- Producer: Enrico Bergier
- Editor: Enzo Meniconi
- Running time: 3h 18min
- Production companies: Rai 2 Taurus Film; Österreichischer Rundfunk (ORF); Zweites Deutsches Fernsehen (ZDF); Televisión Española (TVE)

Original release
- Network: Rai 2
- Release: 30 November 1988

Lenin... The Train is a 1988 English-language TV miniseries directed by Damiano Damiani. Produced by Rai 2 and Taurus Film in collaboration with Österreichischer Rundfunk (ORF), Zweites Deutsches Fernsehen (ZDF) and Televisión Española (TVE), it premiered on 30 November on Rai 2. It follows Vladimir Lenin (Ben Kingsley) on his journey from Switzerland to Petrograd by sealed train through wartime Germany during the Russian Revolution of 1917.

== Cast ==
- Ben Kingsley as Lenin
- Leslie Caron as Nadezhda "Nadya" Krupskaya
- Dominique Sanda as Inessa Armand
- Timothy West as Alexander Parvus (Helphand)
- Peter Whitman as Karl Radek
- Xabier Elorriaga as Fritz Platten
- Jason Connery as David Suljashvili
- Paolo Bonacelli as Grigory Zinoviev
- Wolfgang Gasser as Julius Martov
- Mattia Sbragia as Fürstenberg
- Robin McCallum as Von Buhring
- Günther Maria Halmer as Von Planetz
- Dagmar Schwarz as Olga
- Verena Mayr as Clarissa
- Hans Kraemmer as Von Romberg
- Alan Goodson as Georgy Safarov
