= Zhenotdel =

Women's department in the Bolsheviks' communist party

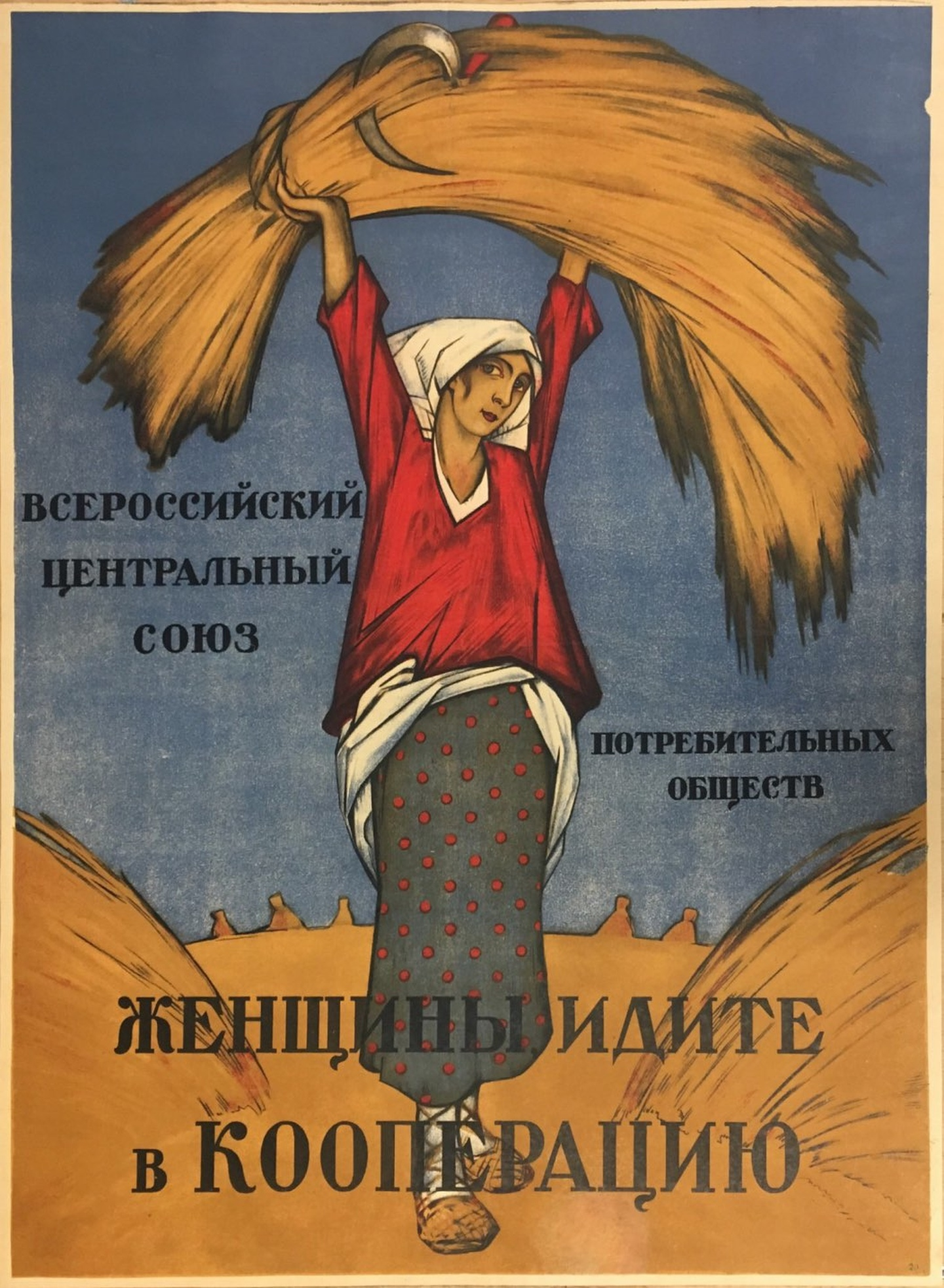
Ignati Nivinski - "Women, Go into the Cooperative" (1918)

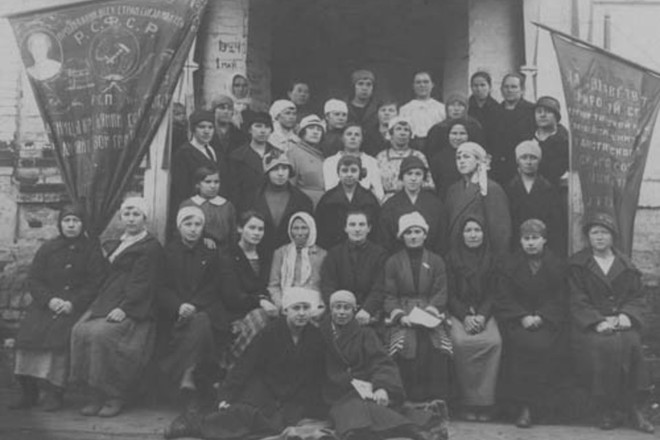
Zhenotdel meeting in Amur Region, 1920

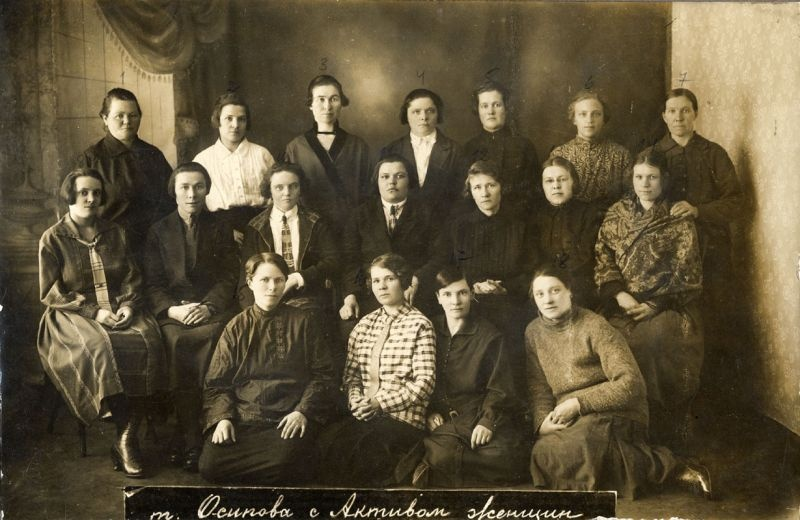
Kasimov Zhenotdel, 1925

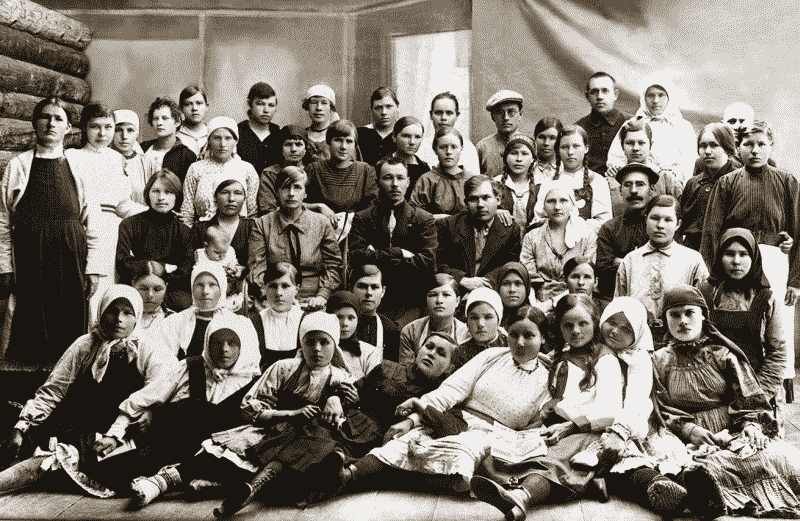
Chuvash Autonomous Oblast Zhenotdel members, 1925

The Zhenotdel (Russian: Женотдел, IPA: [ʐɨnɐdʲˈdʲel]), the women's department of the Central Committee of the All-Russian Communist Party (Bolsheviks), was the section of the Russian Communist party devoted to women's affairs in the 1920s. It gave women in the Russian Revolution new opportunities until it was dissolved in 1930.

== History ==
The Zhenotdel was established by two Russian feminist revolutionaries, Alexandra Kollontai and Inessa Armand, in 1919. It was devoted to improving the conditions of women's lives throughout the Soviet Union, fighting illiteracy, and educating women about the new marriage, education, and working laws put in place by the Communist Party of the Soviet Union. In Soviet Central Asia, the Zhenotdel also spearheaded efforts to improve the lives of Muslim women through literacy and educational campaigns, and through "de-veiling" campaigns.

The Zhenotdel persuaded the Bolsheviks to legalise abortion in Russia, the first country to do so, in November 1920. This was the first time in history that women had the right to free abortions in state hospitals.

== Early development ==
In 1906, Kollontai attempted to organize women into a separate organization within the Russian Social Democratic Party, to discuss the issues they faced at home and in the workplace. This was met with hostility as most employers viewed female workers as "backward", and were only utilized as cheap labor to be abused at will in the workplace.

Kollontai wanted to stray these working women away from the Russian feminist suffrage movements that she felt were superficial and lacked the essence of revolution. She began to teach factory women in St. Petersburg that only through socialism and joining their husbands and brothers in the proletarian revolution, would bring about their liberation. Because of her radical beliefs at the time, she was forced to flee and the beginning of a women's movement she was attempting to create, dissolved.

In 1913, the movement reappeared when the Bolshevik's founded a journal called Rabotnitsa, which detailed issues regarding women. The journal was edited by Inessa Armand and Lenin’s sister, Anna Elizarova. The editors were all arrested as czarist Russia continued to reign. The introduction of World War I brought women workers and soldiers wives together to actively strike against the war and the food pogroms in 1915 and 1916. The harsh living conditions and famines that erupted during the war made the second stage of the women’s movement impossible to maintain.

In 1917, when Kollontai, Armand, and Krupskaia returned to Russia after World War I, they went to work on re-establishing the movement that lost momentum during the war. They republished the journal Rabotnitsa, and used it to organize and start a campaign of women workers in the cities and female textile workers in the neighboring Russian towns. Kollontai also organized a strike of laundresses in Petrograd for better working conditions. The journal was instrumental in instructing women to organize themselves and arrange meetings to spread knowledge and "agitation". Before the October Revolution, this organization already had every aspect of mobilization necessary. All that was left was to legitimize a separate women’s department within the Soviet Union.

In the summer of 1918, the Central Committee agreed to establish the First All Russian Congress of Women where there would be an election to select delegates. Because this was planned during the civil war and transportation was widely unreliable throughout the Soviet Union, only 40 delegates showed up. However, almost immediately the leaders started to receive telegrams from all over the country telling them that they were delayed but were going to make it. 1,200 women managed to get to Moscow. They developed a plan to create a separate women's organization based upon local delegates. This program would include: ending domestic slavery, communalize households to free women from domestic work, end prostitution, protect women's labor and maternity, and bring about a class consciousness to the women of the Soviet Union. This was the first time these women were involved in anything resembling a political space. Although most of these women wanted to be liberated from the double burden all working women experience, they were also afraid that the revolution would strip away traditional family life. Kollontai gave a speech in response, later entitled "The Family and the Communist State", going in detail about how the traditional family structure has already drastically changed and it is up to us to acknowledge this reality and embrace communalized changes that will bring about liberation for all working women.

In September 1919 the Central Committee approved of the plan and created a separate women’s department, the Zhenotdel. The party then instructed local party committees to establish elections for female delegates. These women would be called, zhenskii activ, and would have two to three month terms where they would develop into independent women that would be committed to educating and liberating women throughout the Soviet Union. This would give women a chance to be promoted into government positions and grow into conscious political activists.

== Evolution ==
The creation of the NEP in the early 1920s created a shift in party concern towards industrialization and to create highly skilled workers that were loyal to the Soviet Union. They made women’s issues a secondary priority because the male leadership felt domestic work did not benefit industry. The party made drastic cuts on social spending because the Civil War created mass famine and poverty in the countryside and severe unemployment among women. The Zhenotdel began to evolve away from working towards specific women’s issues, into a tool the party utilized to forward its policies.

== Ideology ==
Before the revolution, Bolsheviks believed that forming a separate women's organization would promote feminist ideas and spend insufficient resources. This hindered several old Bolshevik women from agreeing with the formation of the Zhenotdel because they thought it would prevent a unified proletarian Revolution.

The main idea in a Utopian society for Zhenotdel women is the creation of a liberated and independent woman—a woman that is free and equal to men in every aspect of life. Both men and women believed in freeing women and transforming the family, but their ideas on how to achieve it differed. Male leadership believed that once capitalism is replaced with a socialist state and capital is redistributed to the masses, every person would automatically be rid of their prejudices and an egalitarian society would flourish. Bolsheviks believed in a centralized economy that would eventually create a communist society.

These women, on the other hand, believed that more decentralized and small scale programs would create a communist state. The Zhenotdel wanted to build daycare centers, cafeterias, and laundries in order to liberate women from the double burden of domestic and industrial work. In order to reeducate the population, these women in the Zhenotdel believed that it was up to them to change their circumstances or else it would never happen. In order to eliminate the capitalist state and the exploitation of the proletariat, the Zhenotdel felt that it was essential for women to be liberated and equal to their male comrades.

The Civil War brought no clarity to how exactly their society would be organized. The party believed that the revolution would destroy anything resembling czarist Russia.

== Hujum campaigns in Central Asia ==
Before Stalin came into power and the idea that socialism could exist in only one state became mainstream, the Soviets believed that it would be easier to convince the working classes of the developed Western nations if they created a successful socialist revolution in the East. In order for the Soviet Union to reach its dream of instilling a class consciousness among the working classes and reach a world social revolution, they had to liberate these ‘backward’ women and transform them into free individuals who will be active political participants. Before 1926, de-veiling was not a priority for the Zhenotdel and even believed it was a distraction from the important work that they were doing to bring economic and political independence to Central Asian women. Most Central Asian women did not de-veil. If they did it would have been in large demonstrations far away from home, and would put on their veil again on the way home.

The Hujum campaign did not affect all Central Asian women in the same way. While some Uzbek women welcomed the idea of unveiling they saw it as a chance to get an education, employment, and take part in public life, many others refused to unveil. Some women were forced or pressured to unveil by their families or by the people in their communities. Women who removed their paranjis in public were often faced with threats and even physical harm. In addition, Soviet officials sometimes forced women to take part in unveiling events.

The Hujum began in 1926, the veil acting as a stark contrast between the ‘primitive’ and traditional East with the new promise of socialist progress. The Zhenotdel became the mechanism through which the Soviet Union was able to consolidate its power over its neighboring regions. These Bolshevik women viewed the paranja, as a symbol of their seclusion from society. The use of Soviet propaganda showcased these Muslim women covered head to toe and prohibited from engaging with men outside of their family. The Zhenotdel mainly focused their de-veiling efforts throughout Uzbekistan and Azerbaijan, and they would become the center of Soviet propaganda for years to come. The Soviets wanted a quick and sudden transformation through party policy. The Zhenotdel now spoke of de-veiling as an urgent issue and increasingly spent their efforts organizing large demonstrations where they would hold speeches proclaiming female liberation and end the meetings with these women ridding themselves of their paranjis. They believed that by transforming the oppressive conditions under which these women lived, it would completely change the social and cultural order that prevented a Soviet revolution from happening. These women would then become the face of propaganda as the Soviet Union spread their de-veiled faces to showcase the world the promise of the Socialist state.

== Dissolution ==
When Stalin came into power and facilitated the Five-Year Plan, Zhenotdel workers were at first hopeful that collectivization would lead to the communal housing and socialized childcare they had been fighting for. Although the party officially supported the work of the Zhenotdel they could not settle on how exactly they should organize since hostile tensions between these women and local party members strained the organization’s existence.

Former Zhenotdel workers ended up being the strongest advocates for the collapse of the Zhenotdel. Local party members began to assume that women should take responsibility for areas associated with social services. Several women wanted, instead to be involved in general party work and felt that this was merely the same division of labor that was practiced in the home.

In May 1926 the Party created a decree that transferred the work of organizing women from the Zhenotdel to the local factory unions. The unions did nothing to educate women or move them up to higher positions. 33 percent of women workers in textile factories were illiterate much less actively participating in unions. Most local party officials interpreted this decree as an end to all work among women instead of taking on the role.

In 1927, the Politburo assumed the Zhenotdel was merely copying the work of the rest of the party and wasting valuable resources. In order to combat this, the party established rationalization committees and they advised local party organizations to take down local Zhenotdels. The Politburo deflected opposition to these committees and ignored demands to reinstate a separate women's organization by promoting women to higher positions. This did not solve the tensions between Zhenotdel workers and local party members as women still only comprised 5 percent of overall party membership.

The VIII Trade Union Congress met in 1928 voted to transfer women Zhenotdel workers to join the work of unions. There were now no women to support and address workplace discrimination as the hundreds of thousands of women workers are now infiltrating the workforce because of the rapid industrialization taking place.

In 1929, the work of the Zhenotdel was redirected towards the peasant rebellions as a result of organizing the collective farms. Peasant women were joining farm organizers refusing to give up their grain as the party began doubling down on requisitions of food crops to feed the industrial workers. Smidovich, a former Zhenotdel leader, plead the party to allow the Zhenotdel to take a more active role in getting peasant women to support collectivization. Fearing the peasant women were supporting kulaks the party sent out a decree that emphasized the Zhenotdel to continue their work in the countryside by educating these peasant women on leadership and administrative skills.

On January 5, 1930 the Central Committee disbanded the Zhenotdel. This was part of a larger effort to rapidly industrialize the country. Stalin wanted all resources to be aimed towards collectivization to get ready for World War II. The party felt that women had achieved liberation under the socialist state and it would be unnecessary to continue to promote women to higher positions because they were now seen as equal to their male comrades. Instead, Stalin called the party to take up the work of the Zhenotdel.

The leaders of the Zhenotdel were committed communists, and worked as part of the Soviet state apparatus. Historian Elizabeth Wood has argued that the organization took an active interest in women's problems, and initially served as a conduit for women's issues from the people to the state. The Zhenotdel was shut down by Stalin as he was establishing his power in 1930, he believed that women's issues in the Soviet Union had been "solved" by the eradication of private property and the nationalization of the means of production. After the Zhenotdel was disbanded many of the gendered social rules that had been fought against returned.

== Leaders ==
Zhenotdel had five leaders during its 11 years of existence:

- 1919−1920: Inessa Armand
- 1920−1921: Alexandra Kollontai
- 1922−1924: Sofia Smidovic
- 1924−1925: Klavdiya Nikolayeva
- 1925−1930: Aleksandra Artyukhina

== In popular culture ==
In Ayn Rand's 1934 novel We the Living, the character Comrade Sonia is a leader of the Zhenotdel and the most prominent female member of the Central Committee.

== See also ==
- Women's Department of the Central Committee of the SED
- Zhensovety
- Kommunistka
- Women in the Russian Revolution
- Communist Women's International
- Polina Zhemchuzhina
- Antifascist Committee of Soviet Women
- Hujum
