= Zhensovety =

Soviet women's councils

The zhenskie sovety (shortened to zhensovety) were women's councils set up in localities of the Soviet Union after 1958. They were described as "descendants of the Zhenotdel but enjoy less scope and autonomy than did their namesake".

Although formally dissolved following the collapse of the USSR in 1991, the councils were influential in providing support for the Women of Russia political bloc in Russia.

== Beginnings ==
The organisations were part of Khrushchev's leadership of Nikita Khrushchev, and a notable example of an official women's movement in the late Soviet era. The aim of the zhensovety was to promote social services, Marxist–Leninist thinking and political education for working-class women in the USSR, to encourage women to become politically active (or, if they were housewives, more involved in the workforce and increase economic production).

== Decline and revival ==
The zhensovety declined under the leadership of Leonid Brezhnev, and were revived in under Mikhail Gorbachev's policy of perestroika. Councils existed in most of the Soviet republics, and they were placed under the aegis of the Soviet Women's Committee. According to A. A. Muzyriia and V. V. Kopeiko, there were about 230,000 councils with more than 2.3 million members, and varied greatly in size and scope.

However, they were not welcomed by the emerging feminist movements in the USSR, who saw then as part of the state apparatus, harbouring the nomenklatura (high-ranking officials) and not fully supporting women as the subjects of political change. Genia Brownins describes the zhensovety as a top-down affair before perestroika, and the council leaders tended to be male, and CPSU members. They were, however, freer from control by higher authorities than most Soviet organisations.

Following the collapse of the USSR in 1991, the leader of the SWC (later re-organised as the Women's Union of Russia (WUR)), Alevtina Fedulova, took a more assertive approach and encouraged women's participation in politics (which had declined during the perestroika and glasnost reforms). In October 1993, the electoral bloc Zhenshchiny Rossii (Women of Russia) was formed, gaining support and strength from the zhensovety.
