= Sofia Smidovich =

Bolshevik Feminist and revolutionary (1872–1934)

- Софья Смидович
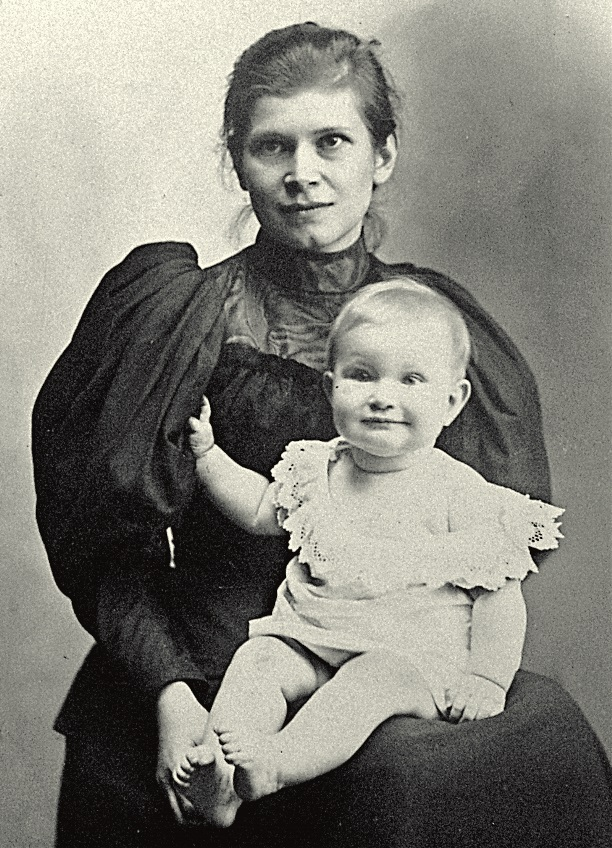
- Smidovich with her daughter Tatiana, 1895

Personal details
- Born: 24 February 1872; Tula, Russian Empire
- Died: 24 November 1934 (aged 62); Moscow, Russian SFSR, USSR
- Political party: RSDLP (Bolsheviks) (1898–1918); Russian Communist Party (1918–34)
- Domestic partner(s): Pyotr Smidovich, Platon Lunacharsky
- Occupation: Revolutionary, Feminist, Politician

Sofia Nikolaevna Smidovich (Russian: Софья Николаевна Смидович; 24 February 1872 – 24 November 1934) was a Bolshevik revolutionary, feminist and the leader of the Zhenotdel from 1922 to 1924.

== Early life ==
Smidovich was born on 24 February 1872 (N.S. 8 March) to a middle-class family in Tula. She only attended high school, unlike many of her high ranking feminists peers. She joined the RSDLP in 1898, where she campaigned with fellow feminist revolutionaries such as Alexandria Kollontai.

== Pre-1917 Revolution Activities ==
Before the 1917 Russian Revolution, Smidovich had taken part in various feminist protests and the 1905 revolution. She became a close and important ally for radical Bolshevik feminists at the time, most notably, Kollontai and Elena Statsova.

== Differing Views to Kollontai ==
Post revolution, it became clear that Smidovich was one of the more conservative Bolshevik feminists and she openly rejected Kollontai's ideas of free love and the destruction of the family unit. She instead wanted to focus on the plight of "single motherhood". Smidovich believed the family should have a healthy relationship of equal partners, not the complete destruction of traditional romantic relationships. Smidovich would eventually oust Kollontai as head of the Zhenotdel in 1922. Smidovich was very much in line with government policy at the time, which was against radical ideas of free love. Kollontai would describe her relationship with Smidovich in her memoirs as "too painful to talk about".

== Later life ==
Smidovich remained an outspoken critic of "loose sexual tendencies". However, like most radical feminists at the time, she disappeared in political obscurity, after the rise of Stalin. Stalin viewed many feminists as potential opposition, so Smidovich was suppressed. Smidovich would die in November 1934 in Moscow.
