= Inessa Armand =

French communist politician (1874–1920)

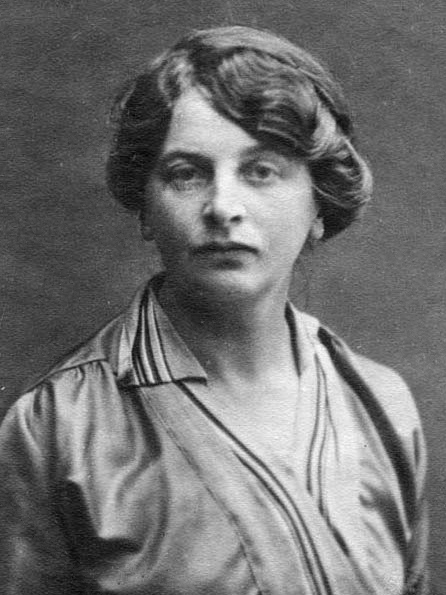
- Armand in 1916
- Born: Elisabeth-Inès Stéphane d'Herbenville; 8 May 1874; Paris, France
- Died: 24 September 1920 (aged 46); Nalchik, Russia
- Resting place: Kremlin Wall Necropolis, Moscow
- Other names: Inessa Fyodorovna Armand, Elena Blonina
- Movement: Bolsheviks
- Spouses: Alexander Armand (m. 1893; div. 1902) Vladimir Armand (m. 1902)
- Partner: Vladimir Lenin (1911–1912/1914)
- Children: 5
- Relatives: Hugo Eberlein (son-in-law)

Inessa Fyodorovna Armand (Note: Russian: Инесса Фёдоровна Арманд.) (born Elisabeth-Inès Stéphane d'Herbenville; 8 May 1874 – 24 September 1920) was a French-Russian communist politician, member of the Bolsheviks and a feminist who spent most of her life in Russia.

Armand, being an important figure in the pre-Revolution Russian communist movement and the early days of the communist era, had been almost forgotten for some time, until the partial opening of Soviet archives during the 1990s (despite this, many valuable sources regarding her life still remain inaccessible in Russian archives). Historian Michael Pearson wrote about her: "She was to help him (Lenin) recover his position and hone his Bolsheviks into a force that would acquire more power than the tsar, and would herself by 1919 become the most powerful woman in Moscow."

== Early life and marriages ==
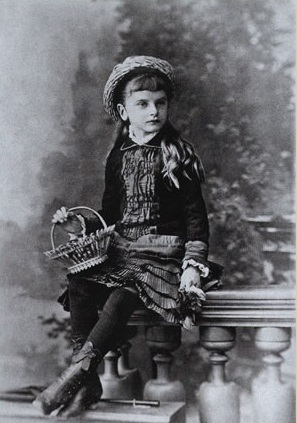
Armand in 1882

Armand was born in Paris. Her mother, Nathalie Wild, was a comedienne of half-French and half-English descent, and her father, Théodore Pécheux d'Herbenville, was a French opera-singer. Her father died when she was five and she was brought up by her aunt and grandmother living in Moscow, both teachers.

At the age of nineteen she married Alexander Armand, the son of a wealthy Russian textile manufacturer. The marriage produced four children. Inessa and her husband opened a school for peasant children outside of Moscow. She also joined a charitable group dedicated to helping the city's destitute women.

== Life ==
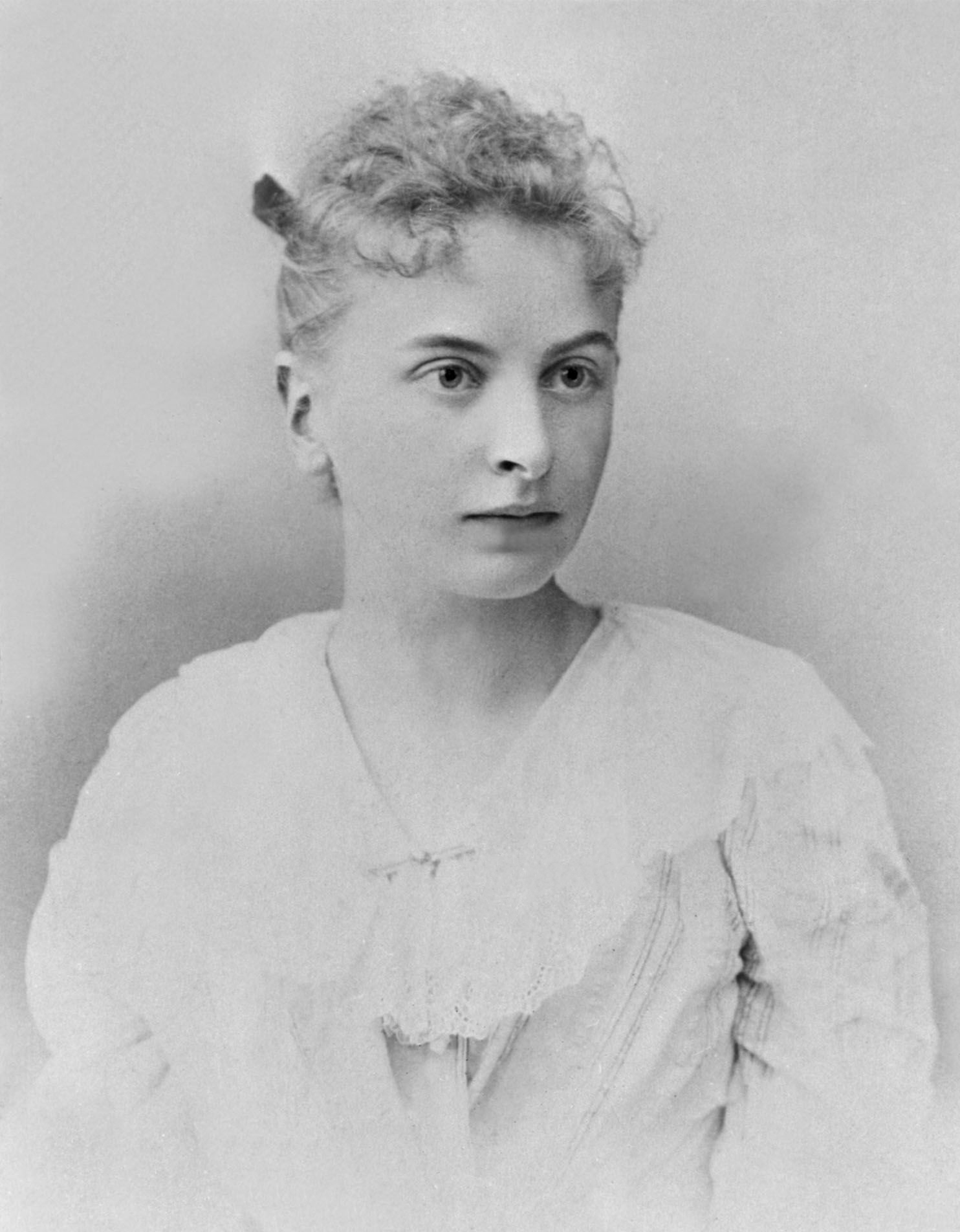
Armand in 1895

In 1902, she left her husband, with whom she had an open marriage, to marry his younger brother Vladimir, who shared her radical political views, and bore him her fifth child, Andrei.

In 1903, she joined the illegal Russian Social Democratic Labour Party. Armand distributed illegal propaganda; after her arrest in June 1907 she was sentenced to two years' internal exile in Mezen in Northern Russia.

In November 1908 Armand managed to escape from Mezen and eventually left Russia to settle in Paris, where she met Vladimir Lenin and other Bolsheviks living in foreign exile. In 1911 Armand became secretary for the Committee of Foreign Organisations established to coordinate all Bolshevik groups in Western Europe.

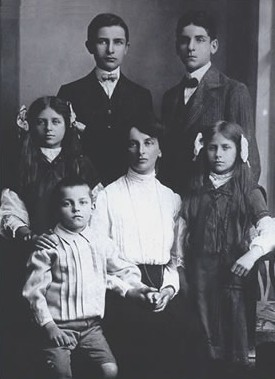
Armand with her children in Brussels, 1909

Armand returned to Russia in July 1912. This was a risky mission. Lenin needed her to pass on the resolution of the Prague Conference, to help organise the Bolshevik campaign to get its supporters elected to the Duma, and find out what was going on in Pravda. Helen Rappaport notes that Lenin knew her entry into Russia would invite immediate arrest, yet he made light of it, his concerns for party works overcoming his personal feelings for her. Two months later she was arrested and imprisoned, only to be released against bail in March 1913, thanks to Alexander's generous support. Once again illegally leaving Russia, she went to live with Vladimir Lenin and Nadezhda Krupskaya in Galicia. She also began work editing Rabotnitsa. Krupskaya, with admiration, noted that exhausted as Armand was, she threw herself immediately into the party works. Lenin wrote to her and trusted her more than anyone else in his circles. The Okhrana considered Armand to be the right hand of Lenin. According to author Ralph Carter Elwood, "Even more than Trotsky during the Iskra period, she became Lenin’s ‘cudgel’ — someone to beat wavering Bolsheviks back into line, to convey uncompromising messages to his political opponents, to carry out uncomfortable missions which Lenin himself preferred to avoid".

Armand was upset that many socialists in Europe chose not to fight against the war effort during World War I. She joined Lenin in helping to distribute propaganda that urged Allied troops to turn their rifles against their officers and to start a socialist revolution.

Lenin appointed her as the Bolshevik representative to the International Socialist Bureau conference in Brussels in July 1914. Bertram Wolfe remarked, "He was sending her to meet and do battle with such large figures as Kautsky, Vandervelde, Huysmans, Luxemburg, Plekhanov, Trotsky and Martov. He counted on her mastery of all the languages of the International, her literal devotion to him and his views, her steadfastness under fire". He wrote to her:

I am convinced that you are one of those who develops, grows stronger, becomes more energetic and bolder when alone in a responsible post … I stubbornly disbelieve the pessimists who say that you — are hardly — nonsense and again nonsense.

In March 1915 Armand went to Switzerland where she organised the anti-war International Conference of Socialist Women.

=== Russian Revolution ===
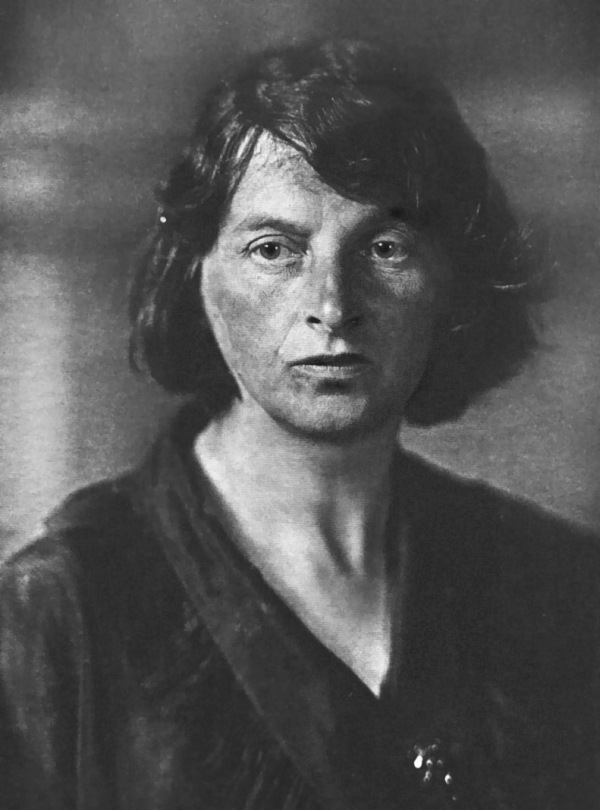
Armand in 1920

On 2 March 1917 Tsar Nicholas II abdicated, leaving the Provisional Government in control of the country, which declared the Russian Republic. The Bolsheviks in exile became desperate to return to Russia to help shape the future of the country. The German Foreign Ministry, which hoped that Bolshevik influence in Russia would help bring the war on the Eastern Front to an end, provided a special train for Armand, Vladimir Lenin and 26 other revolutionaries to travel to Petrograd.

She did not participate in most of the revolutionary events, choosing to take care of her ill son Andrei instead. It is still unclear why she chose to be inactive during this crucial period of seizing power, although she had interrupted her revolutionary activities for the sake of her children in 1905, 1908 and 1913. On 19 April, she did attend a Moscow Oblast Conference, in which she made forceful speeches on the necessity of the election of officers and the fraternization of combatant forces, as well as on the opportunism of the Second International's leaders.

After the October Revolution, Armand headed the Moscow Economic Council and served as an executive member of the Moscow Soviet. She became a staunch critic of the Soviet government's decision to sign the Treaty of Brest-Litovsk. On her return to Petrograd, she became the first director of Zhenotdel, an organisation that fought for female equality in the Communist Party and the Soviet trade unions (Zhenotdel operated until 1930), with powers to make legislative decisions. She drove through reforms to allow women rights to divorce, abort, participate in government affairs and create the facilities like mass canteens and mother centers. In 1918, with Sverdlov's assistance against opposition from Zinoviev and Radek, she succeeded in getting a national congress of working women held, with Lenin as a speaker. According to Elwood, the reason the party leadership agreed to back up Armand’s agitation for communal facilities was that the Civil War required enlisting women into factory work and auxiliary tasks in the Red Army, which created the need to release women from traditional duties. Armand also chaired the First International Conference of Communist Women in 1920. The spring of 1920 saw the appearance, again on Armand’s initiative, of the journal Kommunistka, which dealt with "the broader aspects of female emancipation and the need to alter the relationship between the sexes if lasting change was to be effected".

== Death ==
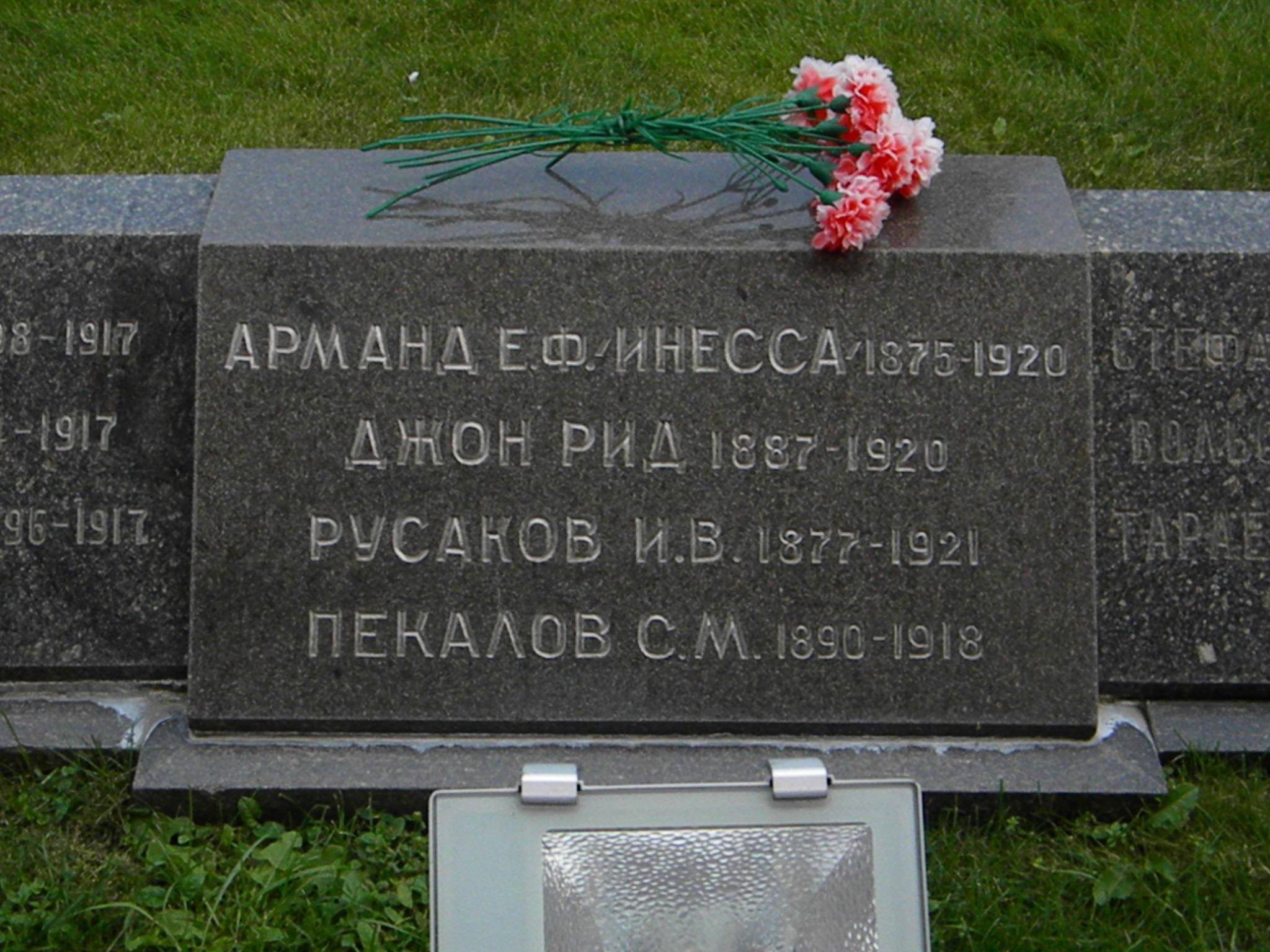
Red Square Mass Grave No. 5, inscriptions for Inessa Armand, John Reed, Ivan Rusakov and Semyon Pekalov

Realizing that she was exhausted from an overload of work, Lenin had urged Armand to go to the Caucasus for a holiday, without knowing that the area was suffering an epidemic and had not been pacified by the Red Army. She and other patients had to be evacuated from the region. On the evening of 21 September 1920, she ventured out to meet the Nal'chik Executive Committee, perhaps to get accommodation for her group, and contracted cholera. She died in the morning hours of 24 September, aged 46. A state funeral was organized, with a mass singing of the Internationale. She was buried in Mass Grave No. 5 of the Kremlin Wall Necropolis in Red Square, Moscow, being the first woman to receive this honour.

In the first edition of the Great Soviet Encyclopedia, published in 1926, she was commemorated as a "senior and dedicated Bolshevik" and as "a close friend and aide of Lenin", but by the 1930s her work had been forgotten. The Zhenotdel was abolished in 1930.

== In literature and film ==
Inessa Armand is assumed to be the model for the fictional heroine of the novel A Great Love, written in 1923 by Alexandra Kollontai, who knew both Lenin and Armand. The heroine is in love with a revolutionary leader, assumed to be based on Lenin who "takes her devotion to him for granted and returns it with resentment and suspicion." Armand has been portrayed in the films Lenin in Paris (1981, played by Claude Jade), Lenin...The Train (1988, played by Dominique Sanda) and All My Lenins (1997, played by Janne Sevchenko). She was also portrayed as the heroine in the fictionalised account of Lenin's Russian return: Seven Days to Petrograd (1988 by Tom Hyman, Penguin Books).

== Romantic relationship with Lenin ==
Armand and Lenin were very close friends from 1911 to 1912 or 1914; how sexual their relationship was remains a debated point among scholars.

Krupskaya wrote about her:

We were terribly glad...at her arrival...In the autumn (of 1913) all of us became very close to Inessa. In her there was much joy of life and ardor. We had known Inessa in Paris, but there was a large colony there. In Krakow lived a small closely knit circle of comrades. Inessa rented a room in the same family with which Kamenev lived. My mother became closely attached to Inessa. Inessa often went to talk with her, sit with her, have a smoke with her. It became cosier and gayer when Inessa came. Our entire life was filled with party concerns and affairs, more like a student commune than like family life, and we were glad to have Inessa... Something warm radiated from her talk.

In In Memory of Inessa Armand, Krupskaya further suggested that Inessa and Lenin were bonded together by their common favourite fictional work What Is to Be Done?:

Inessa was moved to socialism by the image of woman’s rights and freedom in What Is To Be Done? Like the heroine, she broke her ties with one man to live with another, concerned herself with good deeds to redeem the poor female and the prostitute, tried to solve the problems of woman’s too servile place in society. Indeed, whole generations of Russian radicals were influenced by Chernyshevsky’s many-sided utopian novel and were moved to imitate its “uncommon men and women”. Just as Marx could be the spiritual ancestor of people as various as Bernstein, Kautsky, Bebel, and Luxemburg, so Chernyshevsky was a formative influence for the two men who in their persons incarnated the two opposing poles of socialism in 1917: Tsereteli and Lenin. If Inessa found in the novel her image of woman’s rights and freedom in love, and Lenin the prototypes of his vanguard and his leadership, Tsereteli found there his ideal of service to the people.

Angelica Balabanoff recalled about the relationship between Armand and Lenin:

Lenin loved Inessa. There was nothing immoral in it, since Lenin told Krupskaya everything [again the same code]. He deeply loved music, and this Krupskaya could not give him. Inessa played beautifully — his beloved Beethoven and other pieces. He sent Inessa to the Youth Conference of the Zimmerwald Group — a little old, but she had a credential from the Bolsheviks and we had to accept it. He did not dare to come himself, sat downstairs in a little adjacent cafe drinking tea, getting reports from her, giving her instructions. I went down for tea and found him there. Did you come na chai, I asked, or na rezoliutsii? (for tea, or for the resolution?) He laughed knowingly, but did not answer. [Inessa fought hard, but the resolution Lenin prepared for her was defeated 13–3.] When Inessa died, he begged me to speak at her funeral. He was utterly broken by her death.

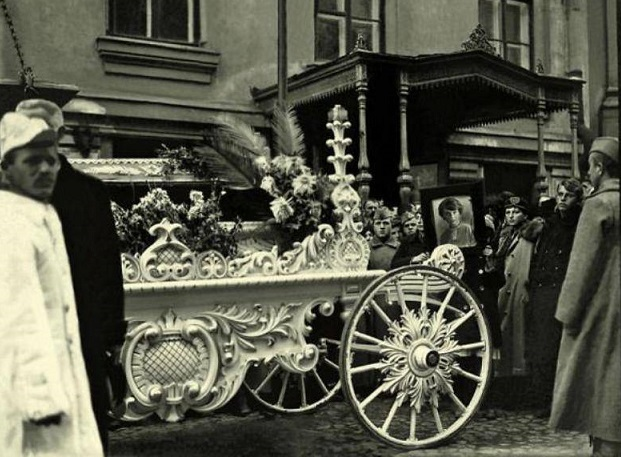
Inessa Armand's funeral in Moscow

Bob Gould stated "It is fairly clear from Armand’s last diary entries, and from Lenin’s utter devastation at her death, that they may both have had some vague perspective of resuming the physical side of their relationship at some more favourable time in the future, as people often do in such circumstances. Another feature of Inessa Armand was that, despite her intense emotional involvement with Lenin, she was capable of disagreeing with him politically on points of principle. She was a vigorous participant in the Workers' Opposition, despite the fact that this involved a profound political collision with Lenin".

According to Elwood, since Bertram Wolfe posited the existence of the romantic relationship in 1963, Western scholarship has focused so much on it that her achievements as a revolutionist and a feminist are usually obscured. Elwood tried to call attention to her work first as an underground propagandist, then as a Bolshevik organizer in emigration, and finally as a defender of women's rights in the workplace and in society.

== See also ==
- Outline of the Russian Revolution and Civil War
- Bibliography of the Russian Revolution and Civil War
- Bibliography of Stalinism and the Soviet Union
- Index of Old Bolsheviks
- Index of articles related to the Russian Revolution and Civil War
- History of feminism
- Women in the Russian Revolution

== Cited sources ==
- Elwood, Ralph Carter (1992). Inessa Armand: Revolutionary and Feminist (PDF). Cambridge University Press. ISBN 9780521894210.
