= Kommunistka =

Russian political magazine (1920–1930)

- Categories: Feminism, Marxism
- Frequency: Monthly
- Founder: Alexandra Kollontai, Inessa Armand
- Founded: 1920
- Final issue: 1930
- Country: Soviet Union
- Based in: Moscow
- Language: Russian
- OCLC: 4821795

Kommunistka (in Russian: Коммунистка, IPA: [kəmʊˈnʲistkə], lit. 'Communist Woman') was a communist magazine from the Soviet Union, associated to the Zhenotdel, founded by Inessa Armand and Alexandra Kollontai in 1920.

Kommunistka was published on a monthly basis. The magazine was targeted specially to lower class women, and explored the way to achieve women's emancipation, not only in a theoretical manner, but practical, as the Russian Revolution by itself would not solve the women's inequality and oppression in the family and society. Armand and Kollontai emphasized the low percentage of women in the public sphere – in the Russian Communist party, in economic management, in the soviets, in the trade unions and in the government – fixing which would require a specific effort "to achieve liberation".

Armand, Kollontai or Krupskaya addressed issues such as sexuality, abortion, marriage and divorce, the relationship between sexes, free love, morality, family, motherhood or the liberation of women from the slavery of men. Furthermore, the magazine's perspective emphasized that women liberation was intimately linked to the emancipation of the whole communist society.

The magazine disappeared in 1930 together with the Zhenotdel itself under the Stalinist mandate.

== See also ==
- Rabotnitsa
- Soviet woman (magazine)
- Iskra
- Pravda
