= Nadezhda Krupskaya =

Wife of Vladimir Lenin (1869–1939)

- Надежда Крупская
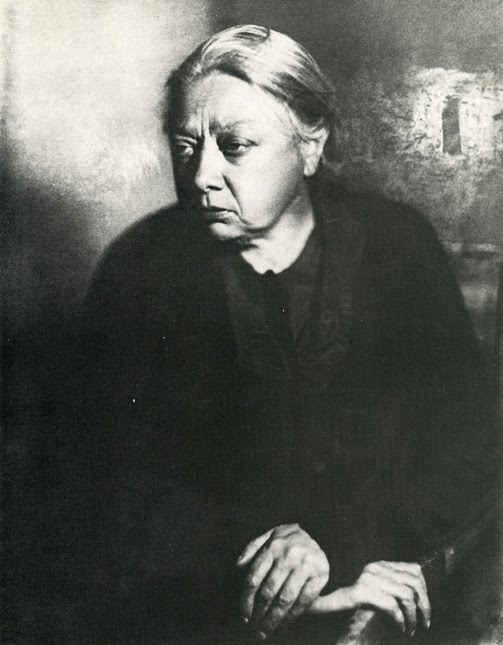
- Krupskaya in the 1920s

Deputy People's Commissar for Education
- In office 1929 – 27 February 1939

Spouse of the Premier of the Soviet Union
- In office 8 November 1917 – 21 January 1924
- Preceded by: Position established
- Succeeded by: Maria Ulyanova; Nadezhda Alliluyeva (de facto)

Personal details
- Born: 26 February 1869 Saint Petersburg, Russian Empire
- Died: 27 February 1939 (aged 70) Moscow, Russian SFSR, Soviet Union
- Resting place: Kremlin Wall Necropolis
- Party: Russian Social Democratic Labour Party (Bolsheviks) (1903–1918); Communist Party of the Soviet Union (1918–1939)
- Spouse: Vladimir Lenin (m. 1898; died 1924)

Nadezhda Konstantinovna Krupskaya (Note: In this name that follows East Slavic naming customs, the patronymic is Konstantinovna and the family name is Krupskaya.) (Note: Scientific transliteration: Nadežda Konstantinovna Krupskaja.) (Russian: Надежда Константиновна Крупская, IPA: [nɐˈdʲeʐdə kənstɐnʲˈtʲinəvnə ˈkrupskəjə]; 26 February [O.S. 14 February] 1869 – 27 February 1939) was a Russian revolutionary, politician and political theorist. She was a leading figure in the Bolshevik party and was married to Vladimir Lenin.

Krupskaya was born in Saint Petersburg to an aristocratic family that had descended into poverty, and she developed strong views about improving the lives of the poor. She embraced Marxism and met Lenin at a Marxist discussion group in 1894. Both were arrested in 1896 for revolutionary activities and after Lenin was exiled to Siberia, Krupskaya was allowed to join him in 1898 on the condition that they marry. The two settled in Munich and then London after their exile, before briefly returning to Russia to take part in the Revolution of 1905.

Following the 1917 Revolution, Krupskaya was at the forefront of the political scene, becoming a member of the Communist Party's Central Committee in 1924. She was deputy education commissar from 1929 to 1939, with strong influence over the Soviet educational system, including development of Soviet librarianship.

Krupskaya died in Moscow in 1939, a day after her seventieth birthday. The circumstances of her death and personal tensions with Joseph Stalin have prompted several claims, some of which derived from Stalin's inner circle, that she was poisoned.

== Early life ==
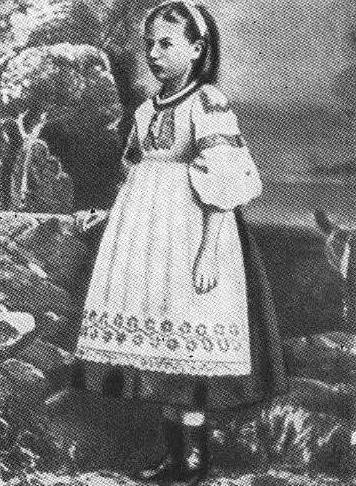
Krupskaya in 1876

Nadezhda Krupskaya was born to an upper class but impoverished family. Her father, Konstantin Ignatyevich Krupski (1838–1883), was a Russian military officer and a nobleman of the Russian Empire who had been orphaned in 1847 at the age of nine. He was educated and given a commission as an infantry officer in the Imperial Russian Army.

Just before leaving for his assignment in Poland, he married Krupskaya's mother. After six years of service, Krupski lost favour with his supervisors and was charged with "un-Russian activities". He may have been suspected of being involved with revolutionaries. Following this time he worked in factories or wherever he could find work. Just before his death, he was recommissioned as an officer.

Krupskaya's mother, Yelizaveta Vasilyevna Tistrova (1843–1915), was a daughter of landless Russian nobles. Yelizaveta's parents died when she was young and she was enrolled in the Bestuzhev Courses, the highest formal education available to women in Russia at the time. After earning her degree, Yelizaveta worked as a governess for noble families until she married Krupski.

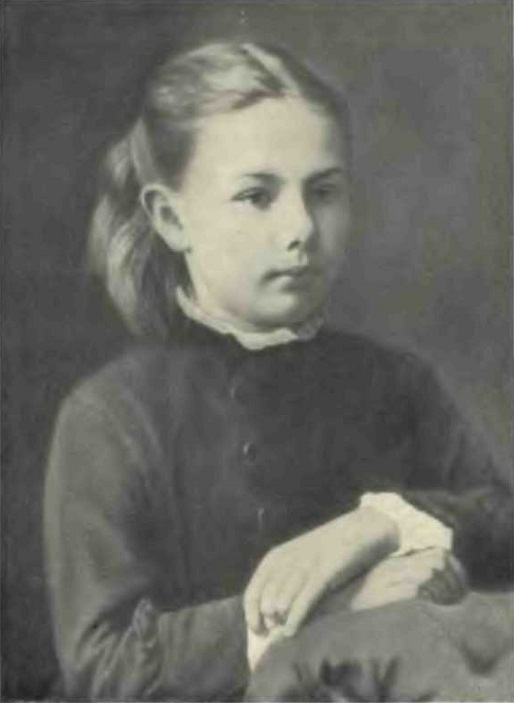
Krupskaya in 1879

Having parents who were well educated and of aristocratic descent, combined with first-hand experience of lower-class working conditions, probably led to the formation of many of Krupskaya's ideological beliefs. "From her very childhood Krupskaya was inspired with the spirit of protest against the ugly life around her."

One of Krupskaya's friends from gymnasium, Ariadne Tyrkova, described her as "a tall, quiet girl, who did not flirt with the boys, moved and thought with deliberation, and had already formed strong convictions . . . She was one of those who are forever committed, once they have been possessed by their thoughts and feelings . . ." She briefly attended two different secondary schools before finding the perfect fit with Prince A. A. Obolensky's Female Gymnasium, "a distinguished private girls' secondary school in Petersburg." This education was probably more liberal than most other gymnasiums since it was noted that some of the staff were former revolutionaries.

After her father's death, Krupskaya and her mother gave lessons as a source of income. Krupskaya had expressed an interest in entering the education field from a young age. She was particularly drawn to Leo Tolstoy's theories on education, which were fluid instead of structured. They focused on personal development of each individual student and centred on importance of the teacher–student relationship.

This led Krupskaya to study many of Tolstoy's works, including his theories of reformation. These were peaceful, law-abiding ideas, which focused on people abstaining from unneeded luxuries and being self-dependent instead of hiring someone else to tend their house, etc. Tolstoy made a lasting impression on Krupskaya; it was said that she had "a special contempt for stylish clothes and comfort." She was always modest in dress, as were her furnishings in her home and office.

As a devoted, lifelong student, Krupskaya began to participate in several discussion circles. These groups were formed to study and discuss particular topics for the benefit of everyone involved. It was later, in one of these circles, that Krupskaya was first introduced to the theories of Marx. This piqued her interest as a potential way of making life better for her people and she began an in-depth study of Marxist philosophy. This was difficult since books on the subject had been banned by the Russian government, meaning that revolutionaries collected them and kept them in underground libraries. In 1890, she joined a Marxist circle organised by the engineer, Robert Klasson. The following year, she took a job in a Sunday school for adult workers.

== Married life ==
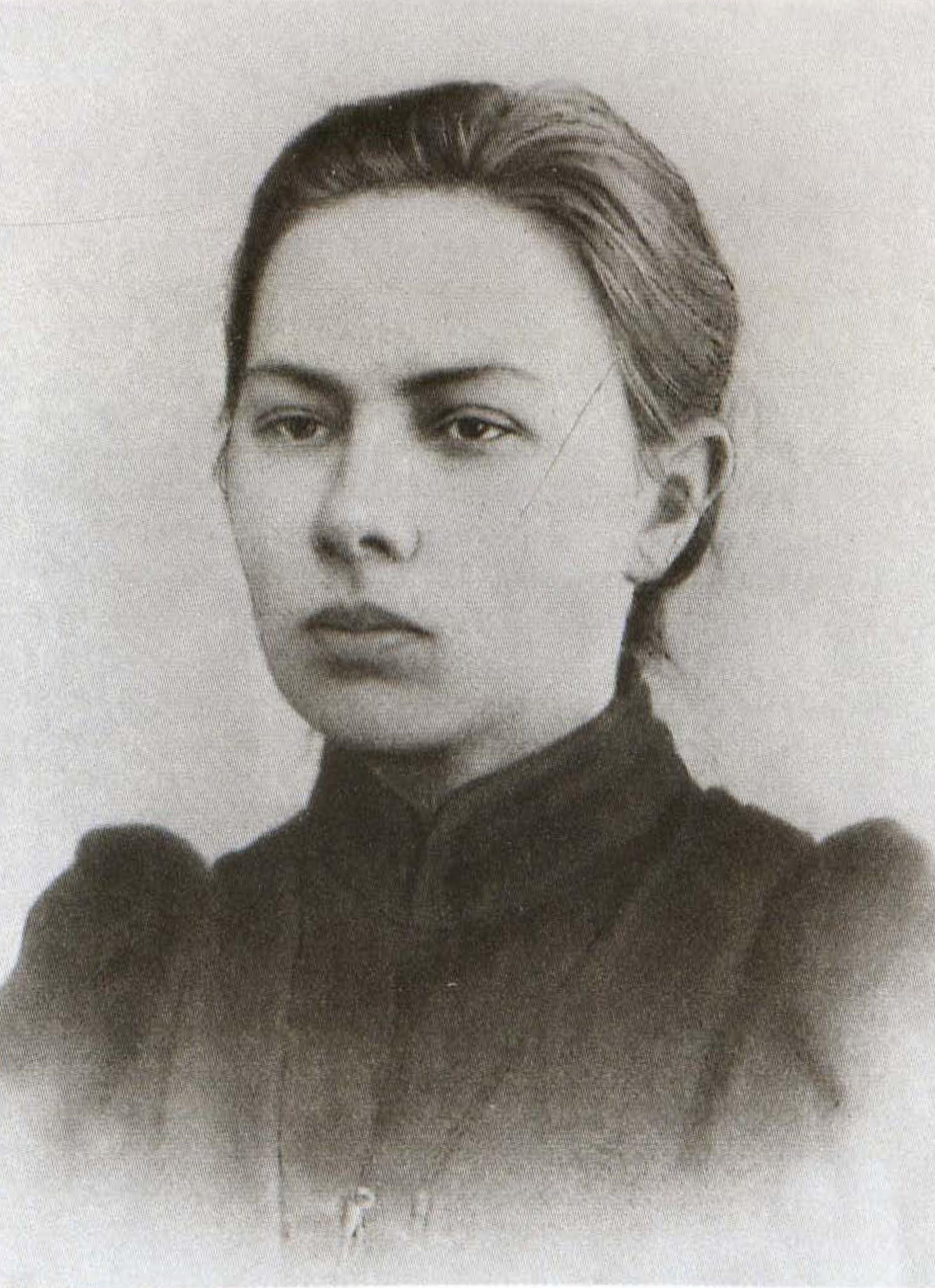
Krupskaya in the 1890s

Krupskaya first met Vladimir Ilyich Ulyanov (later known as Vladimir Lenin) in February 1894 at a similar discussion group. She was impressed by his speeches but not his personality, at least not at first. It is hard to know very much of the courtship between Lenin and Krupskaya as neither party spoke often of personal matters.

In October 1896, several months after Lenin was arrested, Krupskaya was also arrested. She was briefly interned in the Peter and Paul Fortress, but was released after another female convict burned herself to death. She was sentenced to three years exile in Ufa, but before she was deported, she received a "secret note" from Lenin, delivered by her mother, which suggested that she could be permitted to join him in his place of exile, a village in the Minusinsk region of Siberia if she told people she was his fiancée. Krupskaya was permitted to accompany Lenin but only if they were married as soon as she arrived. Her mother travelled with her to Siberia, where she joined Lenin in May 1898.

In her memoirs, Krupskaya notes "with him even such a job as translation was a labour of love".

It is believed Krupskaya suffered from Graves' disease, an illness affecting the thyroid gland in the neck which causes the eyes to bulge and the neck to tighten. It can also disrupt the menstrual cycle, which may explain why Lenin and Krupskaya never had children.

Upon his release, Lenin went off to Europe and settled in Munich. Upon her release Krupskaya joined him (1901). After she arrived, the couple moved to London.

Krupskaya wrote a memoir of her life with Lenin, translated in 1930 as Memories of Lenin and in 1959 as Reminiscences of Lenin. The book gives the most detailed account of Lenin's life before his coming to power and ends in 1919.

== Political career ==
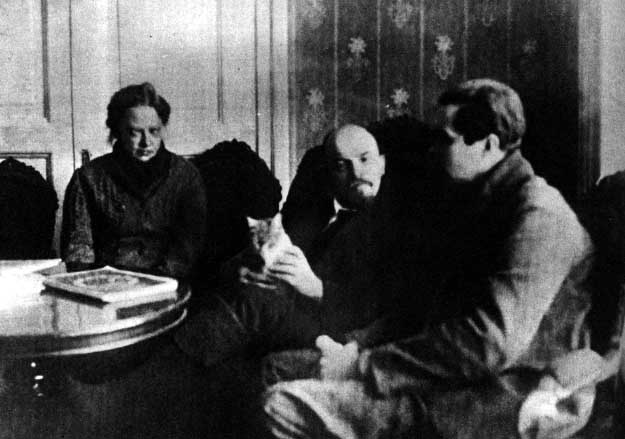
Krupskaya, Vladimir Lenin, Lenin's cat, and American journalist Lincoln Eyre in the Kremlin, 1920

Krupskaya's political life was active: she was anything but a mere functionary of the Bolshevik faction of the Russian Social Democratic Labour Party from 1903.

Leon Trotsky, who was working closely with Lenin and Krupskaya from 1902 to 1903, writes in his autobiography (My Life, 1930) of the central importance of Krupskaya in the day-to-day work of the RSDLP and its newspaper, Iskra. "The secretary of the editorial board [of Iskra] was [Lenin's] wife [...] She was at the very center of all the organization work; she received comrades when they arrived, instructed them when they left, established connections, supplied secret addresses, wrote letters, and coded and decoded correspondence. In her room there was always a smell of burned paper from the secret letters she heated over the fire to read..."

Krupskaya became secretary of the Central Committee in 1905; she returned to Russia the same year, but left again after the failed revolution of 1905 and worked as a teacher in France for a couple of years.

=== Russian Revolution ===
After the Russian Revolution in 1917, she was appointed deputy to Anatoliy Lunacharskiy, the People's Commissar for Education, where she took charge of Vneshkol'nyi Otdel of the Adult Education Division. She became chair of the education committee in 1920 and was the deputy education commissar (government minister) from 1929 to 1939.

Krupskaya was instrumental in foundation of the Soviet educational system itself. She was also fundamental in the development of Soviet librarianship.

Krupskaya became a member of the Central Committee of the Communist Party of the Soviet Union in 1924, a member of its control commission in 1927, a member of the Supreme Soviet in 1931 and an honorary citizen in 1931. Hilda Ageloff reportedly traveled to interview Krupskaya in 1931 for the newspaper Brooklyn Daily Eagle.

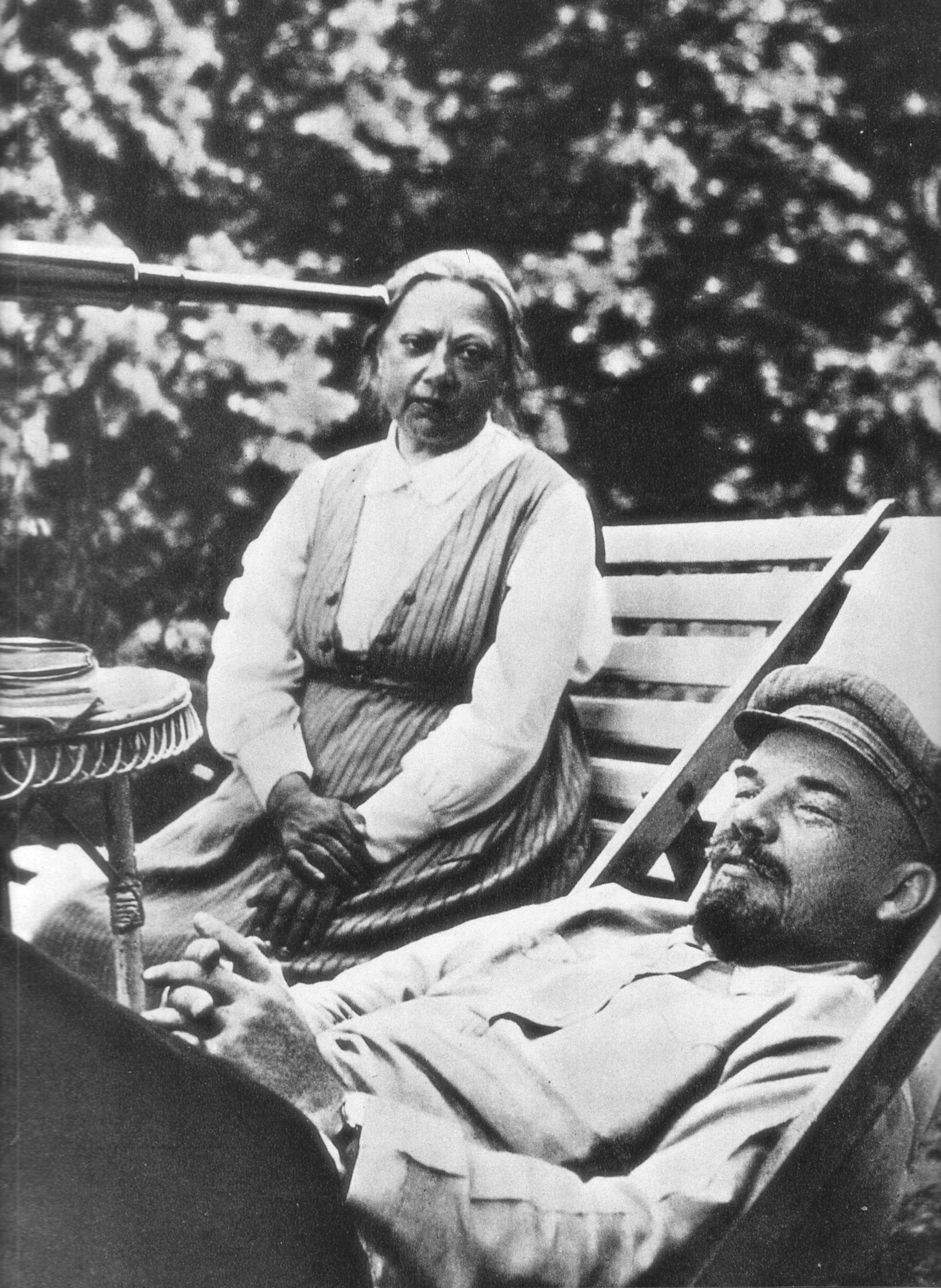
Krupskaya and Lenin, 1922

=== Soviet education and libraries ===
Krupskaya with Young Pioneers at the opening of the L. M. Kipovich Mechanical Brick Factory in Lobnya, 11 August 1928

Before the revolution, Krupskaya worked for five years as an instructor for a factory owner who offered evening classes for his employees. Legally, reading, writing and arithmetic were taught. Illegally, classes with a revolutionary influence were taught for those students who might be ready for them. Krupskaya and other instructors were relieved of duty when nearly 30,000 factory workers in the area went on strike for better wages. Even after the revolution her emphasis was on "the problems of youth organization and education." In order to become educated, they needed better access to books and materials.

Pre-revolutionary Russian libraries had a tendency to exclude particular members. Some were exclusively for higher classes and some were only for employees of a particular company's "Trade Unions". In addition they also had narrow, orthodox literature. It was hard to find any books with new ideas, which is exactly why the underground libraries began. Another problem was the low level of literacy of the masses. Vyborg Library, designed by Alvar Aalto, was renamed the Nadezhda Krupskaya Municipal Library after the Soviet annexation of Vyborg.

The revolution did not cause an overnight improvement in the libraries. In fact, for a while there were even more problems. The Trade Unions still refused to allow general public use, funds for purchasing books and materials were in short supply and books that were already a part of the libraries were falling apart. In addition there was a low interest in the library career field due to low income and the libraries were sorely in need of re-organization.

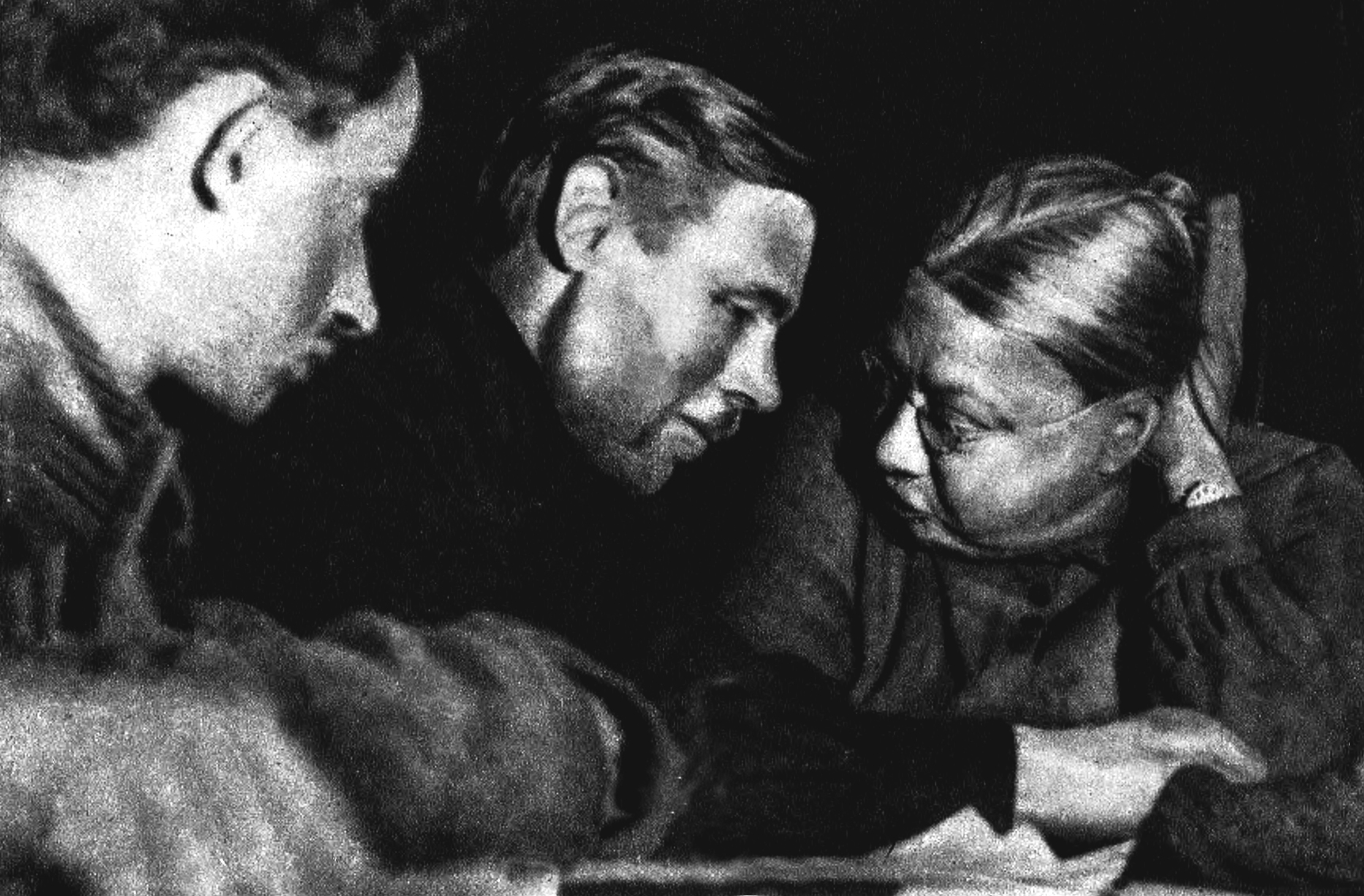
Krupskaya in 1931

Krupskaya directed a census of the libraries in order to address these issues. She encouraged libraries to collaborate and to open their doors to the general public. She encouraged librarians to use common speech when speaking with patrons. Knowing the workers needs was encouraged; what kind of books should be stocked, the subjects readers were interested in, and organizing the material in a fashion to better serve the readers. Committees were held to improve card catalogs.

Krupskaya stated at a library conference: "We have a laughable number of libraries, and their book stocks are even more inadequate. Their quality is terrible, the majority of the population does not know how to use them and does not even know what a library is."

She also sought better professional schools for librarians. Formal training was scarce in pre-revolutionary Russia for librarians and it only truly began in the 20th century. Krupskaya, therefore, advocated creation of library "seminaries" where practicing librarians would instruct aspiring librarians in the skills of their profession, similar to those in the West. The pedagogical characteristics were however those of the Soviet revolutionary period. Librarians were trained to determine what materials were suitable to patrons and whether or not they had the ability to appreciate what the resource had to offer.

Krupskaya also desired that librarians possess greater verbal and writing skills so that they could more clearly explain why certain reading materials were better than others to their patrons. She believed that explaining resource choices to patrons was a courtesy and an opportunity for more education in socialist political values, not something that was required of the librarian. They were to become facilitators of the revolution and, later, those who helped preserve the values of the resulting socialist state.

Krupskaya was a committed Marxist for whom each element of public education was a step toward improving the life of her people, granting all individuals access to the tools of education and libraries, needed to forge a more fulfilling life. The fulfillment was education and the tools were education and library systems.

=== Conflict with Trotsky and Stalin ===
In December 1922, just after Lenin had suffered a second stroke, Krupskaya had a quarrel with Stalin, who was demanding access to Lenin, when she argued that he was too ill. On 23 December, she wrote to Kamenev complaining that the "vile invectives and threats" that Stalin had directed at her were the worst abuse she had suffered from a fellow revolutionary in 30 years.

After the death of Vladimir Lenin in January 1924, Krupskaya grew closer to the political positions of Grigory Zinoviev and Lev Kamenev in Party debates. Factions that would later form throughout the 1920s included the Trotsky-led Left Opposition, the Stalin-led "Centre", and the Bukharin-led Right Opposition. From 1922 to 1925, Zinoviev and Kamenev were in a triumvirate alliance with Stalin's Centre, against Trotsky's Left Opposition. Krupskaya supported them against Trotsky, though in more conciliatory language than they used, declaring in 1924 that "I don't know whether Trotsky is guilty of all the deadly sins of which he is accused."

In 1925, Krupskaya attacked Leon Trotsky in a polemic reply to Trotsky's tract Lessons of October. In it, she stated that "Marxist analysis was never Comrade Trotsky's strong point." In relation to the debate around socialism in one country versus permanent revolution, she asserted that Trotsky "under-estimates the role played by the peasantry." Furthermore, she held that Trotsky had misinterpreted the revolutionary situation in post-World War I Germany.

In late 1925, when the 'triumvirate' split into two factions, she openly supported Zinoviev and Kamenev against Stalin, and went into an alliance with Trotsky's Left Opposition in early 1926, to form the United Opposition. Krupskaya was quoted by Trotsky's son Leon Sedov in his book The Red Book: On the Moscow Trial as saying "Lenin was only saved from prison by his death". But in a major boost for the leadership, Stalin announced at the end of his speech to the Fifteenth party congress in December 1927 that she had abandoned the opposition. Krupskaya had previously written in Pravda in May 1927 that she no longer supported the opposition, but she was then back supporting them months later, before Stalin's announcement at the 15th congress.

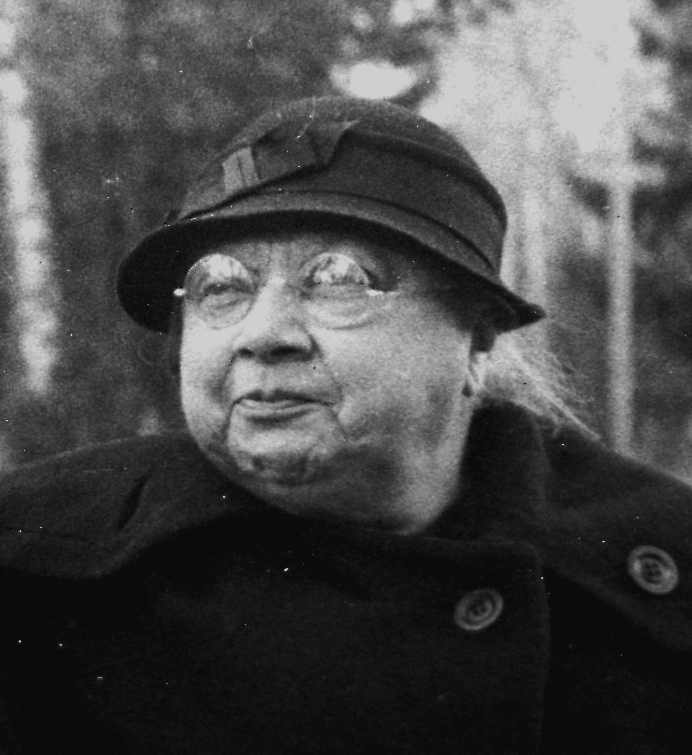
Krupskaya in 1936

In 1930, Krupskaya opposed Stalin again. This time, she gave a speech to the Bauman district party, in Moscow, defending the leaders of the right wing opposition, Nikolai Bukharin and Alexei Rykov, after which, according to Nikita Khrushchev, who was a party official at the time, "without any publicity, the word went out to party circles to give her a working-over ... It was a bitter thing to watch her at these sessions when everyone started coming out against her. I remember her as a broken old woman." Khrushchev also claimed that Stalin threatened to remove Krupskaya's status, and nominate another woman as "Lenin's widow". The same story was told by the former NKVD officer, Alexander Orlov, who claimed that the new 'widow' was to have been Elena Stasova. Another rumour was that it would have been Rosalia Zemlyachka.

In 1936, she defended restrictions on abortion passed by the Soviet government in that year, arguing that they were part of a consistent policy pursued since 1920 to do away with the reasons to have an abortion.

Krupskaya was present at the plenum of the Central Committee in February 1937 which decided the fate of Nikolai Bukharin and Alexei Rykov, and voted in favour of expelling both from the Communist Party. But on other occasions, she tried to intervene on behalf of intended victims. At the Central Committee in June 1937, she protested, in vain, against the arrest of Osip Piatnitsky. She successfully secured the release of an Old Bolshevik named I.D. Chugurin, though he was barred from rejoining the party, and worked as a roofer for the rest of his life.

== Death ==
Krupskaya died from peritonitis in Moscow on 27 February 1939, the day after her seventieth birthday, and her ashes were buried in the Kremlin Wall Necropolis. Stalin's secretary Alexander Poskrebyshev later claimed that Stalin ordered Krupskaya's poisoning during her birthday celebration. Lazar Kaganovich, a former Politburo member and Stalin's associate, also suggested Lavrentiy Beria may have been involved with Krupskaya's poisoning and was quoted in 1991 as saying "I can't dismiss that possibility. He might have." In 1939, Leon Trotsky had made similar assertions about the circumstances of Krupskaya's death.

Conversely, Luigi Zoja, a writer, disputed these claims as he argued that Stalin had sent birthday cakes to Krupskaya on previous occasions and other guests who had eaten the cake were seemingly unaffected. Stefan Thomas Possony suggested that she may have consumed poisoned coffee provided by Beria on Stalin’s orders. Arkadi Vaksberg argued that the delayed medical attention for several hours, on Stalin’s orders, prompted suspicions rather than the rumours of a poisoned cake. He also argued that her physical symptoms resembled those of Pavel Alliluyev, another purported victim of poisoning.

== Legacy ==
- Following her death in 1939, a Leningrad chocolate factory was renamed in her honour. The brand Krupskaya Chocolates still exists today.
- The asteroid 2071 Nadezhda discovered in 1971 by Soviet astronomer Tamara Mikhailovna Smirnova was named in her honour.
- Film director Mark Donskoy made a biographical film Nadezhda of her in 1974.
- In the 1974 BBC production Fall of Eagles, Krupskaya was portrayed by Lynn Farleigh.
- In 1974, Jane Barnes Casey wrote a fictional memoir of her life I, Krupskaya: My Life with Lenin (Houghton Mifflin Company; ISBN 0-395-18501-7).
- UNESCO named a prize in her honour, the UNESCO Nadezhda K. Krupskaya literacy prize.
- In 1997, Nadezhda Krupskaya was portrayed by an Estonian actress Helene Vannari in the Hardi Volmer directed Estonian historic comedy All My Lenins.

== Works ==
- Memories of Lenin. New York: International Publishers, 1930. – Reissued as Reminiscences of Lenin.
- On Education: Selected Articles and Speeches. Moscow: Foreign Languages Publishing House, 1957.

== See also ==
- Bibliography of the Russian Revolution and Civil War
- Outline of the Russian Revolution and Civil War
- Index of articles related to the Russian Revolution and Civil War
- Kommunistka
- Clara Zetkin
- Rosa Luxemburg
- Alexandra Kollontai
- Inessa Armand

== Works cited ==
- Clements, Barbara Evans, Bolshevik Women, Cambridge University Press, 1997.
- Fitzpatrick, Sheila. The Commissariat of Enlightenment: Soviet Organization of Education and the Arts under Lunacharsky, October 1917–1921. Cambridge University Press, 2002.
- McNeal, Robert H., Bride of the Revolution: Krupskaya and Lenin. London: Gollancz, 1973.
- Raymond, Boris The Contribution of N. K. Krupskaia to the Development of Soviet Russian Librarianship: 1917–1939. Ann Arbor, MI: University of Chicago, 1978.
- Scott, Marcia Nell Boroughs, Nadezhda Konstantinovna Krupskaya: A Flower in the Dark. PhD dissertation. University of Texas at Arlington, 1996. Available from ProQuest Dissertations Publishing, 1383491.
