= Sybil (given name) =

Female given name

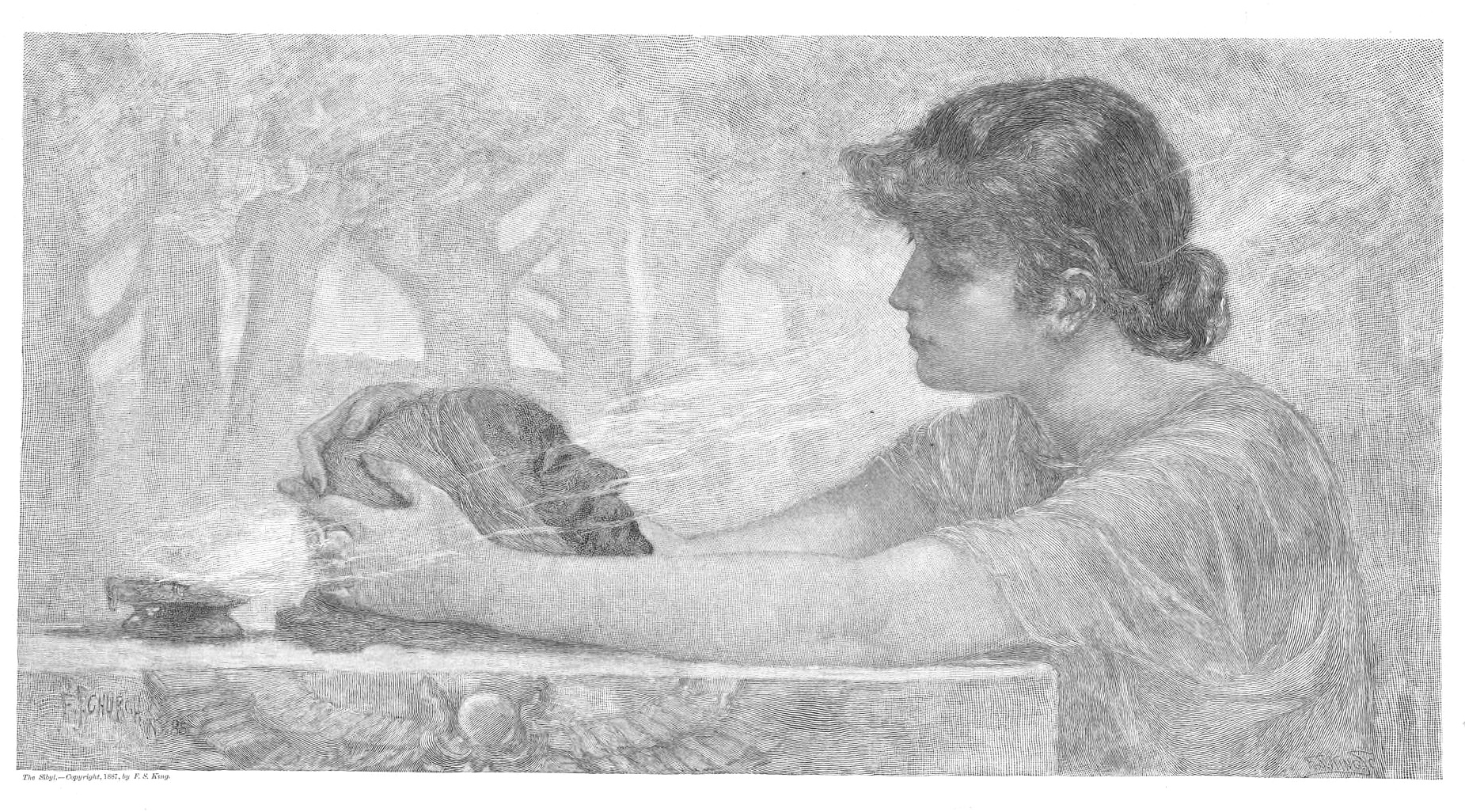
- The Sibyl, engraved by Francis Scott King from the painting by Frederick Stuart Church.
- Gender: female

Origin
- Origin: Greek
- Meaning: "sibyl"

Other names
- Related names: Cybill, Pille, Sibby, Sibil, Sibilia, Sibilla, Sibyl, Sibyle, Sibyll, Sibylle, Sibylla, Sybbie, Sybill, Sybilla, Sybille, Zabel

Sybil or Sibyl is a feminine given name of Greek origin given in reference to the sibyls, oracles of Ancient Greece. It has been in common use in Christian countries since the Middle Ages. Latinate forms of the name in use by 1381 included Sibilla and Sibilia. It was thought suitable as a name for girls by Christians, despite its pagan origins, because the sibyls had delivered messages from a deity and were thought to have been blessed by God with partial understanding of the coming of Jesus Christ. It became more common in the 1800s. Usage of the name recently increased due to a character on the popular TV series Downton Abbey. Sibylle, a French version of the name, is considered a bon chic bon genre name more likely to be given to girls from upper class French families.

In Arabic, Sibil is a variant of the Arabic name سبيل sabil/sebil 'path, road, fountain' It is usually used as a feminine name in the Arab world.

== Sibil ==
- Sibil Pektorosoğlu (born 1974, Armenian-Turkish pop singer
- Zabel Sibil Asadour (1863–1934), Armenian poet, writer, publisher and philanthropist

== Sybil/Sibyl ==
=== A–F ===
- Sybil Andrews (1898–1992), English-Canadian artist, specialised in printmaking, best known for her modernist linocuts
- Sibyl Anikeef (1896–1997), American photographer
- Sybil Arundale (1879–1965), English stage and film actress, born Sybil Kelly
- Sybil Atteck (1911–1975), pioneering Trinidadian painter known for her work in watercolor
- Megan Sybil Baker (born 1954), pseudonym of Linnea Sinclair, American writer of Science Fiction and Fantasy Romance
- Sybil Bauer (1903–1927), American competition swimmer, Olympic champion, former world record-holder
- Sybil Mary Collings Beaumont or Sibyl Hathaway DBE (1884–1974), Dame of Sark from 1927 until her death
- Sybil Bennett (1904–1956), Canadian politician
- Sybil Moseley Bingham (1792–1848), American teacher in the Hawaiian Islands
- Sybil Brand (1899–2004), American philanthropist and activist
- Sybil G. Brinton, author of the novel Old Friends and New Fancies (1913)
- Sybil Brintrup (1954–2020), Chilean conceptual artist, working with traditional and digital media
- Sybil le Brocquy (1892–1973), Irish playwright, patron of the arts and conservationist
- Sybil Buck (born 1972), American musician, yoga instructor and fashion model
- Ethel Sybil Burwell or Ethel Turner (1870–1958), English-born Australian novelist and children's literature writer
- Sybil Campbell OBE (1889–1977), the first woman to be appointed as a stipendiary magistrate in Britain
- Sybil Carlisle (1871–1951), British actress born in South Africa
- Sybil Carmen (1896–1929), American actress, dancer, and Ziegfeld girl
- Sybil Chaplin, known as Judith Chaplin (1939–1993), Conservative Party politician in the United Kingdom
- Sybil Cholmondeley, Marchioness of Cholmondeley CBE (1894–1989), British socialite, Chief Staff Officer in the Women's Royal Naval Service (WRNS) during World War II
- Sybil Christopher (1929–2013), formerly known as Sybil Burton, Welsh actress and theatre director
- Sybil Claiborne (1923–1992), novelist, short story writer, pacifist, member of the Board of the War Resisters League
- Sybil Colefax (1874–1950), English interior designer and decorator, and socialite
- Sybil Connolly (1921–1998), Dublin-based Irish fashion designer known for creating fashion from Irish textiles
- Sybil of Conversano (died 1103), wealthy Norman heiress, Duchess of Normandy by marriage to Robert Curthose
- Sybil Cookson (1890–1963), journalist and writer of romantic novels
- Sybil Cooper (1900–1970), British physiologist
- Sybil Craig OAM (1901–1989), Australian painter
- Sybil Danning (born 1952), Austrian-American actress, model, and film producer
- Sybil Derrible (born 1983), French American engineer, educator, and author
- Sybil Isabel Dorsett or Shirley Ardell Mason (1923–1998), American art teacher reputed to have dissociative identity disorder
- Sybil Dunlop (1889–1968), British jewellery designer, best known work in the late Arts and Crafts style
- Sybil Eaton (1897–1989), British violinist and violin teacher
- Sybil Elgar (1914–2007), the first special-education teacher for those with autism in the United Kingdom
- Sybil Evers (1904–1963), English singer and actress
- Sybil B. G. Eysenck (1927–2020), personality psychologist and the widow of the psychologist Hans Eysenck
- Sybil Fane, Countess of Westmorland (1871–1910), born Lady Sybil Mary St Clair-Erskine, was a British aristocrat and socialite
- Sybil Flory (1920–2017), pharmacist, seamstress and teacher
- Jean Sybil La Fontaine (born 1931), British anthropologist and emeritus professor of the London School of Economics

=== G–M ===
- Sybil Gibson (1908–1995), American painter
- Sybil Mullen Glover (1908–1995), British artist known for her landscape and marine paintings
- Sybil Niden Goldrich, consumer advocate in the fight for women's health relating to breast implants
- Sybil Gordon (1902–1981), English singer and actress
- Sybil Goulding (1897–1971), British literary critic and academic
- Lady Sybil Grant (1879–1955), British writer and artist
- Lady Sybil Grey OBE (1882–1966), British philanthropist and Voluntary Aid Detachment nurse
- Sybil Grey (1860–1939), born Ellen Sophia Taylor, British singer and actress
- Sybil Grove, English actress
- Sybil B. Harrington (1908–1998), American philanthropist
- Sibyl Hathaway DBE (1884–1974), Dame of Sark from 1927 until her death
- Sibyl Heijnen (1961), Dutch visual artist, part of the second generation after 1960
- Dulcie Sybil Holland (1913–2000), Australian composer and music educator
- Sybil Holmes (1889–1979), American politician, the first woman elected to the Massachusetts Senate
- Sibyl Marvin Huse (1866-1939), French-born American author of religious books and teacher of Christian Science
- Sybil Joyce Hylton MBE (1913–2006), Caymanian community volunteer and social advocate
- Sybil Irving MBE (1897–1973), founder and controller of the Australian Women's Army Service during World War II
- Sybil Henley Jacobson, (1881–1953), Canadian painter
- Sybil Jason (1927–2011), South African-born, American child film actress
- Sybil Jefferies (stage name Sweet Sable), American house and R&B vocalist best known for her work during the 1990s
- Sybil Jones (1808–1873), American Quaker preacher and missionary
- Sybil Kaplan (1938-2023), American journalist and author
- Sybil Kent Kane (1856–1946), American socialite, prominent in New York Society during the Gilded Age
- Sybil Kathigasu GM (1899–1948), Malayan Eurasian nurse who supported the resistance during the Japanese occupation of Malaya
- Sybil Kein (1939–2022), Louisiana Creole poet, playwright, scholar, and musician
- Sybil Baker Kelly (1896–1988), state legislator in North Dakota
- Sibyl Kempson (born 1973), American playwright and performer
- Sybil Kennedy (1899–1986), Canadian sculptor
- Sibyll-Anka Klotz (born 1961), German politician
- Sybil Leek (1917–1982), English witch, astrologer, occult author and self-proclaimed psychic
- May Sybil Leslie (1887–1937), English chemist who worked with Marie Curie and Ernest Rutherford
- Sybil Lewis (actress), actress in the United States
- Sybil Lewis (surgeon), OSS (1874–1918), early Scottish surgeon who served with distinction in Serbia during the First World War
- Sybil Ludington (1761–1839), heroine of the American Revolutionary War
- Sybil Lupp (1916–1994), New Zealand mechanic, motor-racing driver, garage proprietor and motor vehicle dealer
- Sybil Mary Joan Lynam (1914–1998), Irish novelist and journalist
- Sybil Lynch (born 1965), American R&B and pop singer–songwriter
- Sybil Marshall (1913–2005), British writer, novelist, social historian, broadcaster, folklorist, educationalist
- Dame Elvira Sibyl Marie Laughton Mathews, DBE (1888–1959), British military officer and administrator
- Sybil I. McLaughlin MBE (1928–2022), first Speaker of the Legislative Assembly of the Cayman Islands
- Sybil Milton (1941–2000), American historian
- Sybil C. Mobley (1925–2015), Dean Emerita of the Florida Agricultural and Mechanical University (FAMU) School of Business and Industry
- Sibyl Moholy-Nagy (1903–1971), German non-fiction writer
- Sybil Montagu, Prioress of Amesbury, daughter of John de Montagu, 1st Baron Montagu and his wife Margaret de Monthermer
- Sybil Morgan (1898–1983), British philatelist on the Roll of Distinguished Philatelists
- Sybil Haydel Morial (1932–2024), American civil rights activist and educator
- Sibyl Morrison (1895–1961), Australian lawyer
- Sybil Morrison (1893–1984), British pacifist, suffragist and activist with several other radical causes
- Sybil Moses (1939–2009), American lawyer and judge
- Sybil Mulcahy (born 1973), Irish journalist and presenter
- Josephine and Sybil Mulvany, New Zealand weavers

=== N–Z ===
- Sybil Neville-Rolfe OBE (1885–1955), social hygienist, founder of the Eugenics Society
- Sybil Fenton Newall or Queenie Newall (1854–1929), English archer who won the gold medal at the 1908 Summer Olympics in London
- Sybil Robson Orr (born 1962), American film producer
- Sybil (wife of Pain fitzJohn), Anglo-Norman noblewoman in 12th-century England
- Daphne Margaret Sybil Desiree Park or Daphne Park CMG, OBE, FRSA (1921–2010), British spy
- Sybil Phoenix OBE (née Marshall; born 1927), British community worker of Guyanese birth
- Sybil Plumlee (1911–2012), American teacher, caseworker, and police officer in Portland, Oregon
- Sibyl Pool (1901–1973), politician from Alabama
- Sybil Pye (1879–1958), self-trained British bookbinder famed for her inlay Art Deco leather bindings
- Tabitha Sybil Quaye (born 1938), Ghanaian politician and a former member of parliament for Takoradi
- Sibyl of the Rhine (1098–1179), aka Hildegard of Bingen, German Benedictine abbess and polymath, writer, composer, philosopher, mystic, visionary, and medical writer and practitioner
- Sibyl Sammis-MacDermid (1876–1940), American soprano
- Sybil Sassoon (1894–1989), British officer during World War 2
- Sybil M. Rock (1909–1981), pioneer in mass spectrometry and computing
- Sybil Rosenfeld (1903–1996), English historian of the theatre
- Sybil Ruscoe (born 1960), British radio and television presenter
- Sybil Sanderson (1864–1903), American operatic soprano during the Parisian Belle Époque
- Sybil Seaton (born 1948), retired South African politician who represented the Inkatha Freedom Party
- Sybil Seely (1900–1984), silent film actress who worked with Buster Keaton
- Sybil P. Seitzinger, oceanographer and climate scientist at the Pacific Institute for Climate Solutions
- Sybil Shainwald (1928–2025), American attorney specializing in women's health law, activist for women's health reform
- Sybil Shearer (1912–2005), American choreographer, dancer and writer
- Sybil Shepherd (born 1950), American actress, singer and former model
- Sybil Sheridan (born 1953), writer and British Reform rabbi
- Sybil Smith (born 1966), American former collegiate swimmer
- Sybil Smolova, Czech-Austrian dancer and film actress of the silent era
- Sybil Stockdale (1924–2015), American campaigner for families of Americans missing in South East Asia
- Sybil Tawse (1886–1971), English artist and illustrator
- Sybil Temtchine, American actress
- Sybil Thomas, Viscountess Rhondda, DBE (1857–1941), British suffragette, feminist, and philanthropist
- Sybil Thorndike (1882–1976), English actress who toured internationally in Shakespearean productions
- Sybil Trent (1926–2000), American actress of stage, screen and, predominantly, radio
- Ethel Sibyl Turner (1870–1958), English-born Australian novelist and children's literature writer
- Sibyle Veil (born 1977), French media executive, CEO of Radio France
- Sybil Venegas (born 1950), writer, independent curator, art historian, Professor Emerita at East Los Angeles College
- Sybil Ward (1894–1977), one of the first female lawyers in Delaware
- Sybil Werden (1924–2007), German dancer and actress during the 1950s
- Sybil Wettasinghe (1927–2020), children's book writer and illustrator in Sri Lanka
- Sybil Whigham, (1871–1954), Scottish golfer
- Sibyl Taite Widdows (1876–1960), British Scientist, member of the Chemistry department at the London School of Medicine for Women for 40 years
- Sibyl Wilbur (1871–1946), American journalist, suffragist, and author of a biography of Mary Baker Eddy
- Sybil Wolfram (1931–1993), English philosopher and writer of German Jewish origin
- Sybil Yazzie (1917–1918), Diné (Navajo) painter

Fictional characters called Sybil include:

- Sibyl, a character in Agents of S.H.I.E.L.D.
- Sybil Barton, a character in 1941 American comedy film Angels with Broken Wings, played by Binnie Barnes
- Sybil Birling, a character in the play An Inspector Calls by J. B. Priestley
- Sybil Branson, a character in Downton Abbey played by Jessica Brown Findlay, or her daughter, nicknamed "Sybbie"
- Sybil Dvorak, a mutant supervillain character appearing in American comic books published by Marvel Comics
- Sybil Fawlty, a character played by Prunella Scales in the BBC TV series Fawlty Towers
- Sybil Pandemik, a character in Sam & Max
- Sybil Stone, a character played by Diane Keaton in the film The Family Stone
- Sybill Trelawney, a character in the Harry Potter series
- Sibyl Vane, a character in the novel The Picture of Dorian Gray by Oscar Wilde
- Lady Sybil Vimes, a character in the Discworld series by Terry Pratchett
- Dr. Sybil Zane, a character in the Wolverine and the X-Men television series
- Sybil, an important character in Look Outside.

== See also ==
- The Adventures of Sybil Brent (German: Das Abenteuer der Sibylle Brant), a 1925 German silent film
- Eli and Sybil Jones House, a historic house at Maine State Route 3 and Dirigo Road in South China, Maine
- Sybil Brand Institute, disused women's jail in Monterey Park, Los Angeles County, California
- The Morning Show with Sybil & Martin, a morning magazine show that aired on TV3 (Ireland)
- Sybil Halpern Milton Memorial Prize, annual award by the German Studies Association (GSA)

== Notes ==
Media related to Sybil (given name) at Wikimedia Commons
