= David Whitteridge =

British physician and physiologist

Professor David Whitteridge FRS FRSE FRCP

Waynflete Professor of Physiology, University of Oxford
- In office 1968–1979

Personal details
- Born: 22 June 1912 Croydon, Surrey, England
- Died: 15 June 1994 (aged 81) Oxford, England
- Occupation: Physician, physiologist

David Whitteridge (1912–1994) was a British physician and physiologist. Also an electrophysiologist, he was one of the first to demonstrate point to point relationship between nerve endings and specific points of activity within the brain.

He is also remembered for his phrase "physiology equals anatomy plus thought".

== Life ==
He was born in Croydon in London on 22 June 1912 the son of Walter Whitteridge, and his French wife, Jean Hortense Carouge. He was educated at the Whitgift School.

He studied Sciences at Oxford University graduating MA in 1934 then studied medicine at Magdalen College, Oxford under John Carew Eccles, graduating MB ChB in 1937. Continuing research under Sir Charles Sherrington he was involved in the now-controversial experiments to show "faradisation" in experiments of attaching electrodes to monkey brains. He also looked at the effects of anaesthetics and toxic gases on the heart and brains. He then became resident medical officer at Finchley Memorial Hospital.

During the Second World War he worked with Ludwig Guttmann caring for spinal injuries at Stoke Mandeville Hospital.

In 1944 he became demonstrator in physiology at Oxford University. He began working with Sybil Cooper and Peter Daniel on the muscles controlling eye movement, and began making topographical point-to-point maps of the brain during the same period.

In 1950 he was created professor of physiology at the university. He was made a Fellow of the university in 1968 succeeding George Lindor Brown in the Waynflete Chair.

In 1951 he was elected a Fellow of the Royal Society of Edinburgh. His proposers were Ernest Cruickshank, Philip Eggleton, William Ogilvy Kermack, and Sir Edmund Hirst. He was vice president of the society from 1956 to 1959. He was elected a Fellow of the Royal Society of London in 1953. In 1956 he was elected a member of the Harveian Society of Edinburgh.

In 1984/85 he went to India in the wake of the Bhopal Disaster to give advice on consequent neurological issues. He was made an honorary member of the Indian National Science Academy as a result, and awarded the Mahalanobis Medal.

He retired in 1979 and died in Oxford on 15 June 1994 aged 81.

His work in neuroscience was continued and expanded by former students and colleagues such as Michael Gaze and Autar Singh Paintal

== Family ==
In 1938 he married medical historian Dr Gweneth Hutchings (d.1993). They had three children.

== Publications ==
- Trends in Neuroscience (1982)
- 100 years of Congresses of Physiology (1989)
