= Mulraney =

Mulraney is a surname. Notable people with the surname include:

- Jake Mulraney (born 1996), Irish footballer
- Jock Mulraney (1916–2001), Scottish footballer

== See also ==
- Mullaney
- Mulroney
- Mulvaney
