= Mulvaney =

Mulvaney or Mulvany is an Irish surname. Notable people with the surname:

Mulvaney

- Dick Mulvaney (b. 1942), English football player
- Dylan Mulvaney (b. 1996), American social media personality, actress, and singer
- Elle Mulvaney (b. 2002), English actress
- James Mulvaney (1922–2010), American investment banker and lawyer
- James Patrick Mulvaney (1933-2012), American politician from Missouri
- Jimmy Mulvaney (1921–1993), Scottish football player
- John Mulvaney (1925–2016), Australian archaeologist
- Maggie Mulvaney, political campaign worker, niece of Mick Mulvaney
- Mick Mulvaney (b. 1967), U.S. politician, Director of the Office of Management and Budget

Mulvany

- Edward Joseph Mulvany (1871–1951), Australian public servant
- Ethel Rogers Mulvany (1904–1992), Canadian social worker and educator
- George Francis Mulvany (1809–1869), Irish painter
- Isabella Mulvany (1854–1934), educator
- John Mulvany (1839–1906), Irish-American artist
- John Skipton Mulvany (1813–1870), Irish architect
- Josephine and Sybil Mulvany (1899–1967 and 1901–1983), New Zealand weavers
- Josh Mulvany (b. 1988), English football player
- Kate Mulvany (b. 1978), Australian playwright and actress
- Patrick Mulvany (1871–1951), Irish politician
- William Thomas Mulvany (1806–1885), Irish entrepreneur

== See also ==
- Private Terence Mulvaney, fictional character in a number of short stories by Rudyard Kipling and one of the Soldiers Three, Learoyd, Mulvaney and Ortheris
- Mulvaney, the "perfect family" in We Were the Mulvaneys, 1996 novel by Joyce Carol Oates
- We Were the Mulvaneys, TV movies based on the novel
