= Kwabena Okyere Darko-Mensah =

Ghanaian politician (born 1974)

Hon. Kwabena Okyere Darko-Mensah
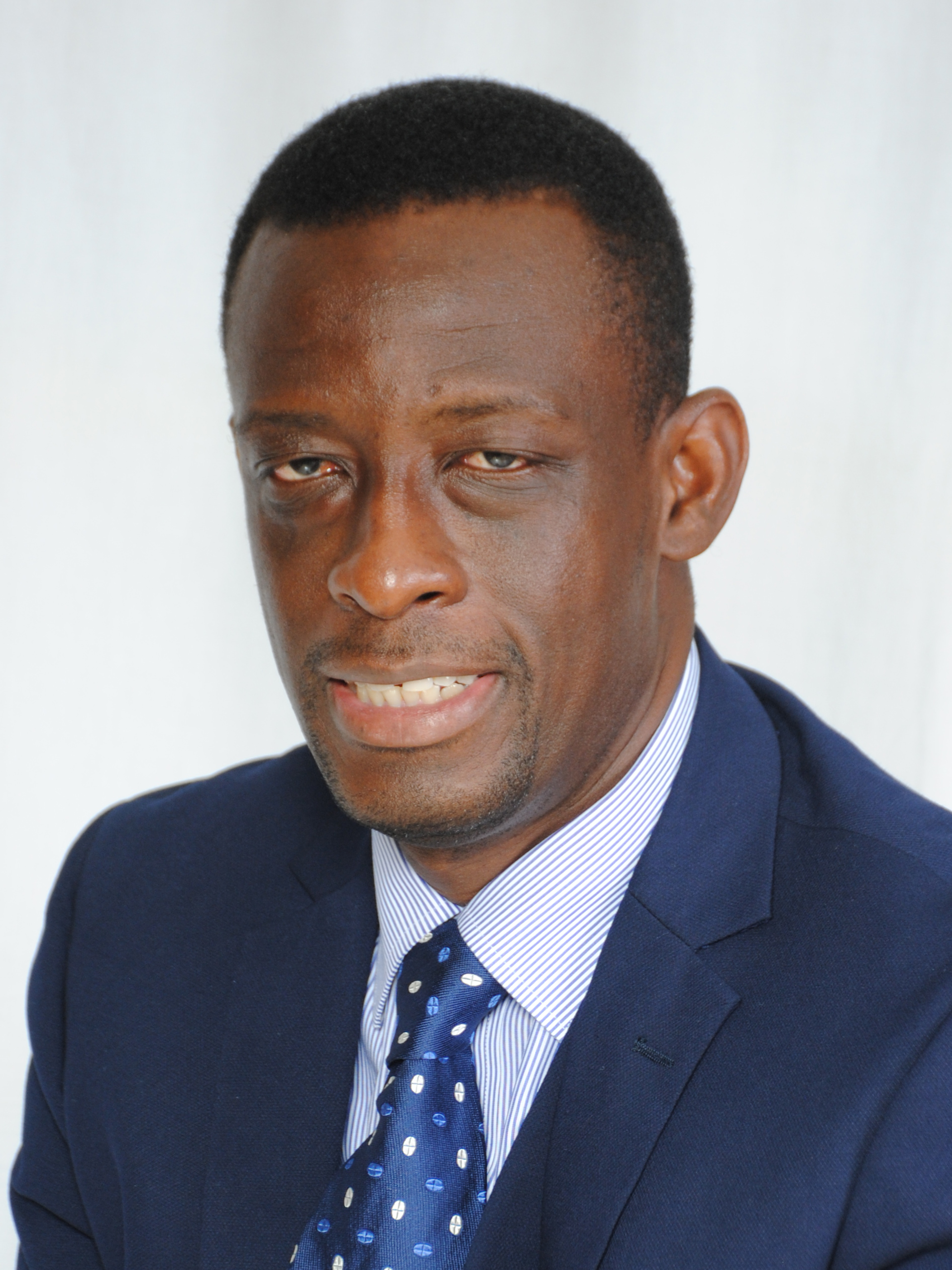

Western Regional Minister
- In office 2019–2025
- President: Nana Akufo-Addo

Deputy Minister for Aviation
- In office 2017 – February 2019
- President: Nana Akufo-Addo

Member of the Ghana Parliament for Takoradi
- Incumbent
- Assumed office 7 Jan 2009
- Preceded by: Gladys Asmah

Personal details
- Born: 18 June 1974 (age 52) Sekondi-Takoradi, Ghana
- Party: New Patriotic Party
- Children: 3
- Education: Mfantsipim School, Kwame Nkrumah University of Science and Technology, University of Cape Coast
- Occupation: Minister (government), Politician
- Profession: Biochemist; Hotelier

Kwabena Okyere Darko-Mensah (born 18 June 1974 in Takoradi, Sekondi-Takoradi, Ghana) is a Ghanaian politician and the current Member of Parliament for the Takoradi constituency in the Western Region of Ghana. He had his secondary education at the Mfantsipim School. He is a member of the New Patriotic Party (NPP) and the Deputy Minister for Aviation in Ghana. Author of Discover Western Region (Tourism guide) and 9.9 lessons. He is the founder and promoter of the “Kobby Youth Investment Initiative” in Takoradi, Western Region of Ghana.

== Early life and education ==
Darko-Mensah was born on 18 June 1974 in Takoradi. He hails from Anwhia-Nkwanta in the Ashanti Region of Ghana. He obtained his Bachelor of Science degree in biochemistry in 2000 from the Kwame Nkrumah University of Science and Technology. He later pursued a postgraduate degree in Democracy, Governance, Law and Development from the University of Cape Coast in 2006. He has also received certificates from Sangonet, South Africa, and EMPRETEC, Ghana.

== Career ==
Darko-Mensah is a biochemist and a hotelier by profession. From 1995 to 1998 he was in charge of operations management at the Ahenfie Hotel. From 2001 to 2006 he was with e-Base Africa Ltd as its Managing Director. He doubled as the Director of Operations at the Guest House Maggi from 2003 to 2008. He was also the finance committee chairman of the Sekondi Takoradi metropolitan assembly, the third largest city of Ghana prior to entering parliament.

== Politics ==
Darko-Mensah entered parliament on 7 January 2009 as a member of parliament for the Takoradi constituency on the ticket of the New Patriotic Party. He has remained in parliament winning the subsequent elections (2012 and 2016) since 2009.

Darko-Mensah was appointed Deputy Minister for Aviation in 2017 by Nana Akufo-Addo. He remained in that position until February 2019 when he was appointed Regional Minister for the Western Region.

In parliament, he has served in various committees, some of which include: the Subsidiary Legislation Committee, the Education Committee, the Business Committee and the Roads and Transport Committee.

== Personal life ==
Darko-Mensah is married, with three children, and is a Protestant Christian Methodist.
