= Gladys Asmah =

Ghanaian politician and entrepreneur

Hon. Gladys Asmah

Member of the Ghana Parliament for Takoradi
- In office 7 January 1997 – 6 January 2009
- Preceded by: Tabitha Sybil Quaye
- Succeeded by: Kwabena Okyere Darko-Mensah

Minister for Fisheries
- In office 2005–2009
- President: John Kufuor

Minister for Women and Children's Affairs
- In office 2001–2005
- President: John Kufuor

Personal details
- Born: 16 October 1939 Cape Coast, Ghana
- Died: 24 June 2014 (aged 74) Accra, Ghana
- Party: New Patriotic Party
- Occupation: Entrepreneur

Gladys Asmah (16 October 1939 – 24 June 2014) was a Ghanaian politician and Entrepreneur. She was a former Minister of Fisheries as well as a member of parliament for the Takoradi Constituency. She was also the former Minister for Women's Affairs under the former President Kufuor administration.

== Early life and education ==
Mrs. Gladys Asmah (born on 16 October 1939), at Cape Coast, in the Central Region. She went to Wesley Girls High School for her primary education and continue to Ghana National College, both in Cape Coast.

She worked with the Ghana Railway Corporation and subsequently as a supervisor at the Laboratory and Quality Control Department of the Pioneer Tobacco Company (PTC), for six years.

Mrs. Asmah left Ghana in June 1963 to pursue further studies in United Kingdom. She attended Middlesex University, formerly known as Hendon College of Technology, and the Leeds College of Education and Home Economics and qualified as a Member of the Institutional Management Association of London.

== Entrepreneur career ==
After her training, she worked with the British Council as an assistant manager at the Overseas' Students Centre, Portland Palace, London. Whilst a student in London, she decided to specialize in the field of dressmaking and therefore familiarized herself with fashion organisations. Mrs. Asmah gathered a few machines and started making nightgowns and petticoat in Birmingham.

She finally came to settle in Ghana, and registered a factory as a partnership and later in 1975 incorporated it as a limited liability Company As an advocate of women emancipation, Mrs. Asmah supported the Tarkwa women Generating income (TWIGA) to secure financial assistance to manufacture palm oil.

When the Social Welfare Department set up the Women Training institute at the Takoradi Neighborhood Center to train girls in vocational subjects, she consented and readily offered her workshop to train young women in the area.

Mrs. Asmah is associated with several business and public organisations; she is the chairperson, Management Board, Takoradi Women Training Institute; board member, Ahantaman Rural Bank-, second vice-president, Association of Ghana Industries; and chairman, Regional Implementation Committee, Women in Development.

The rest -are board member, Fijai Secondary School; board member, Ghana National College; Member, Western Regional Consultative Council and Sector Committee chairman, Women Affairs Committee, New Patriotic Party (NPP). The MP for Takoradi has attended several conferences overseas. These include a seminar on New Trends in Textile and Garment Industry, North Carolina State University in 1994; seminar on Aid to Artisans, Hartford, Connecticut, U.S.A. and Seminar on Export Financing, USAID Entrepreneurs International Conference for Women entrepreneurs, New Delhi, India in 1981.

== Politics ==
She was a member of the New Patriotic Party. She became a member of parliament for Takoradi from 7 January 1997 to 6 January 2009, a Minister of Women and Children Affairs between 2001 and 2005 and Minister of Fisheries from 2005 to 2009. Asmah was a member of the 2nd, 3rd, 4th and 5th parliament of the 4th Republic of Ghana.

During the 1996 Ghanaian General Elections, she polled 25,579 votes out of the 38,036 valid votes cast representing 56.80% over his opponents Esther Nkansah an NDC member who polled 10,342 votes, Alex Fosu Blankson who polled 1,323 votes and Timothy Norbert Kublenu who also polled 792 votes.

She polled 26,431 votes out of the 35,949 valid votes cast representing 73.50% over his opponents Crosby Mochia an NDC member who polled 6,853 representing 19.10%, Eustace Haizel a CPP member who polled 1,510 representing 4.20%, Elizabeth Comfort Baidoo an NRP member who polled 878 votes representing 2.40% and Samuel Ekow Renner a PNC member who polled 277 representing 0.80%.

During the 2004 Elections, she polled 25,714 votes out of the 36,392 valid votes cast representing 66.80% over her opponents Esthher Lily Nkansah an NDC member who polled 7,894 votes representing 20.50%, Francis Kobina Eghan a member 1,048 votes, Eustace Haizel a CPP member who polled 1,296 votes representing 3.40%, Godwill Abakah a IND member who polled 220 votes representing 0.60%, Ivor Tackie Adams a PNC member who polled 191 votes representing 0.50% and Johannes Kojo Scheck an IND member who polled 62 votes representing 0.20%.

== Death ==
Gladys Asmah died on 24 June 2014, at the Korle-Bu Teaching Hospital in Accra where she had been hospitalized for two weeks. She was buried in Takoradi after her funeral on 1 November 2014.

== Sources ==
- Gladys Asmah GhanaWeb.com
- Gladys Asmah Death Myjoyonline.com
