= Whitteridge =

Whitteridge is a surname. Notable people by that name include:

- Gweneth Whitteridge (1910-1993), president of the History of Medicine Society of the Royal Society of Medicine.
- Gordon Whitteridge (1908–1995), British diplomat.
