= Mari Beyleryan =

Armenian feminist, writer and public figure (1877-1915)

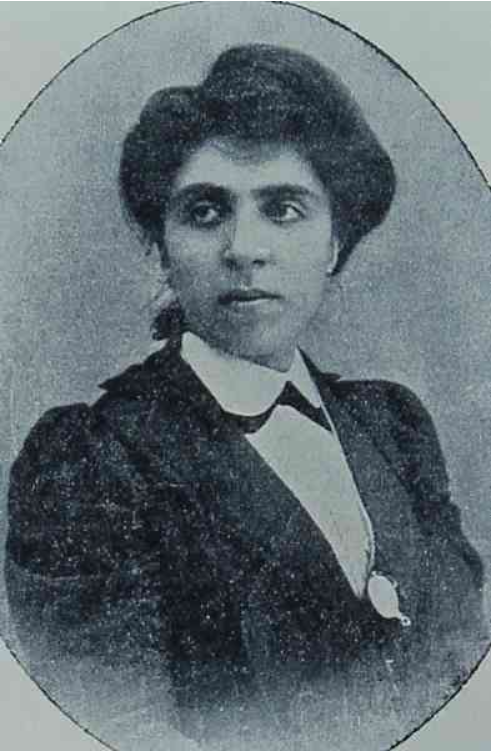
- Born: 23 March 1877; Beşiktaş, Ottoman Empire
- Died: 24 April 1915 (aged 38)
- Occupations: Writer, teacher
- Known for: Activism, writing
- Notable work: Artemis magazine

Mari Beyleryan (Armenian: Մառի Պեյլերյան; 23 March 1877 – 24 April 1915) was an Armenia Armenian feminist activist, writer, and public figure and a victim of the Armenian genocide.

== Biography ==
Mari graduated from the Esayan college of Constantinople, then studied at the studio of Bera. She contributed to various journals including Arevelk and Hunchak. Facing arrest for her participation in the 1895 Bab Ali demonstrations, Beyleryan was forced to flee to Egypt from her native Constantinople.

During her time in Alexandria she taught at a local Armenian school and between 1902 and 1903 she published the Artemis, an Armenian women's journal that ran from January 1902 to December 1903. Beyleryan accepted submissions not only from famous writers but from Armenian women throughout the diaspora. She was especially interested in the role Armenian women would play in the development of national identity. Editorials authored by Beyleryan explored several women's rights themes, including motherhood. She believed women's education and employment were central to Armenian national development.

Beyleryan returned to Constantinople only after the Ottoman Constitution of 1908 was put in place following the Young Turk Revolution. She continued to work as a teacher in Smyrna and later at Tokat Armenian school until 1915, when she died in the Armenian genocide.
