= Women in Armenia =

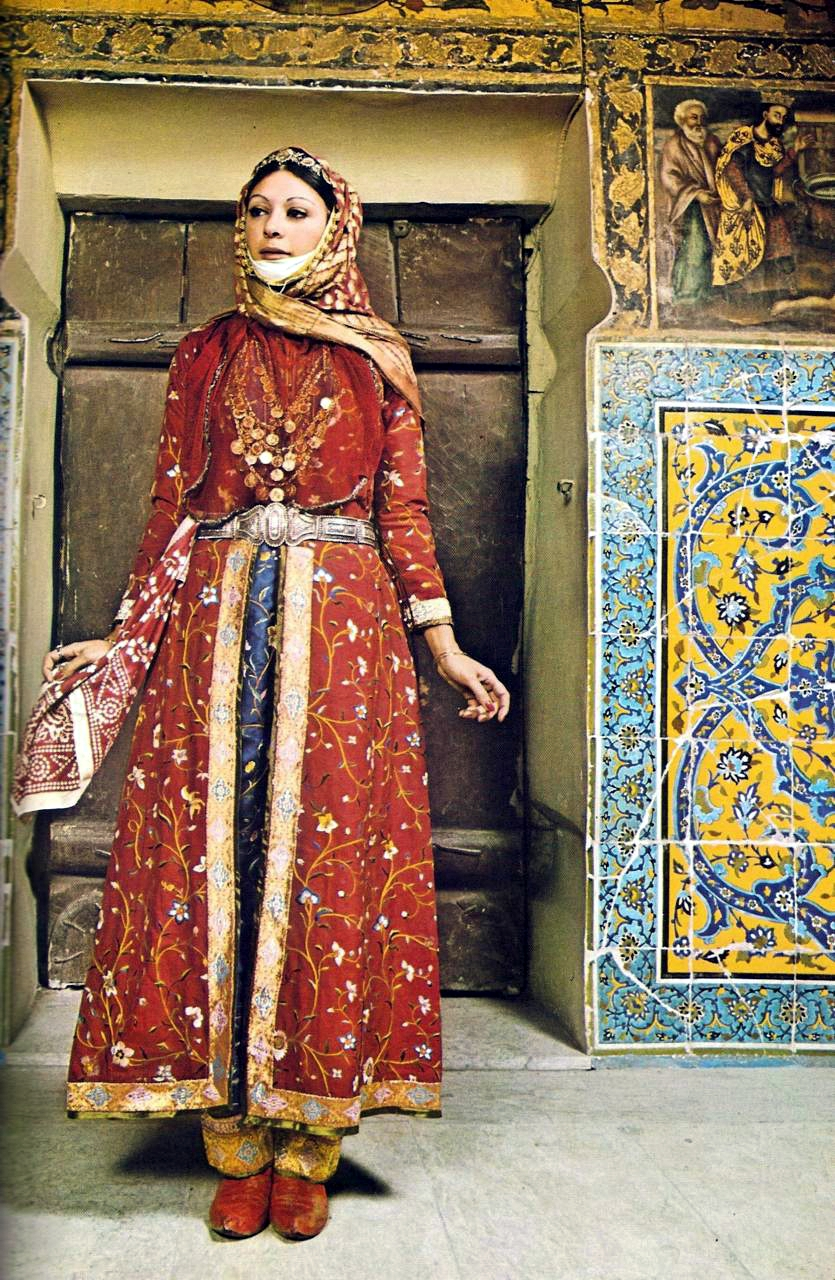
- An Armenian woman from New Julfa in national costume. From The Costumes of Armenian Women by Gregory Lima (Tehran, 1974)

General statistics
- Maternal mortality (per 100,000): 26 (2017)
- Women in parliament: 35.51% (2023)
- Women over 25 with secondary education: 94.1% (2010)
- Women in labour force: 69% (2022)

Gender Inequality Index
- Value: 0.216 (2021)
- Rank: 53rd out of 191

Global Gender Gap Index
- Value: 0.731 (2025)
- Rank: 59th out of 148

Women in Armenia have had equal rights, including the right to vote, since the establishment of the First Republic of Armenia. On June 21 and 23, 1919, the first direct parliamentary elections were held in Armenia under universal suffrage - every person over the age of 20 had the right to vote regardless of gender, ethnicity or religious beliefs. The 80-seat legislature, charged with setting the foundation for an Armenian state, contained three women deputies: Katarine Zalyan-Manukyan, Perchuhi Partizpanyan-Barseghyan and Varvara Sahakyan.

The constitution of the current Republic of Armenia was adopted in 1991 and officially guarantees gender equality. This has enabled women to actively participate in all spheres of Armenian life. Armenian women have attained prominence in entertainment, politics and other fields.

== Work and business ==
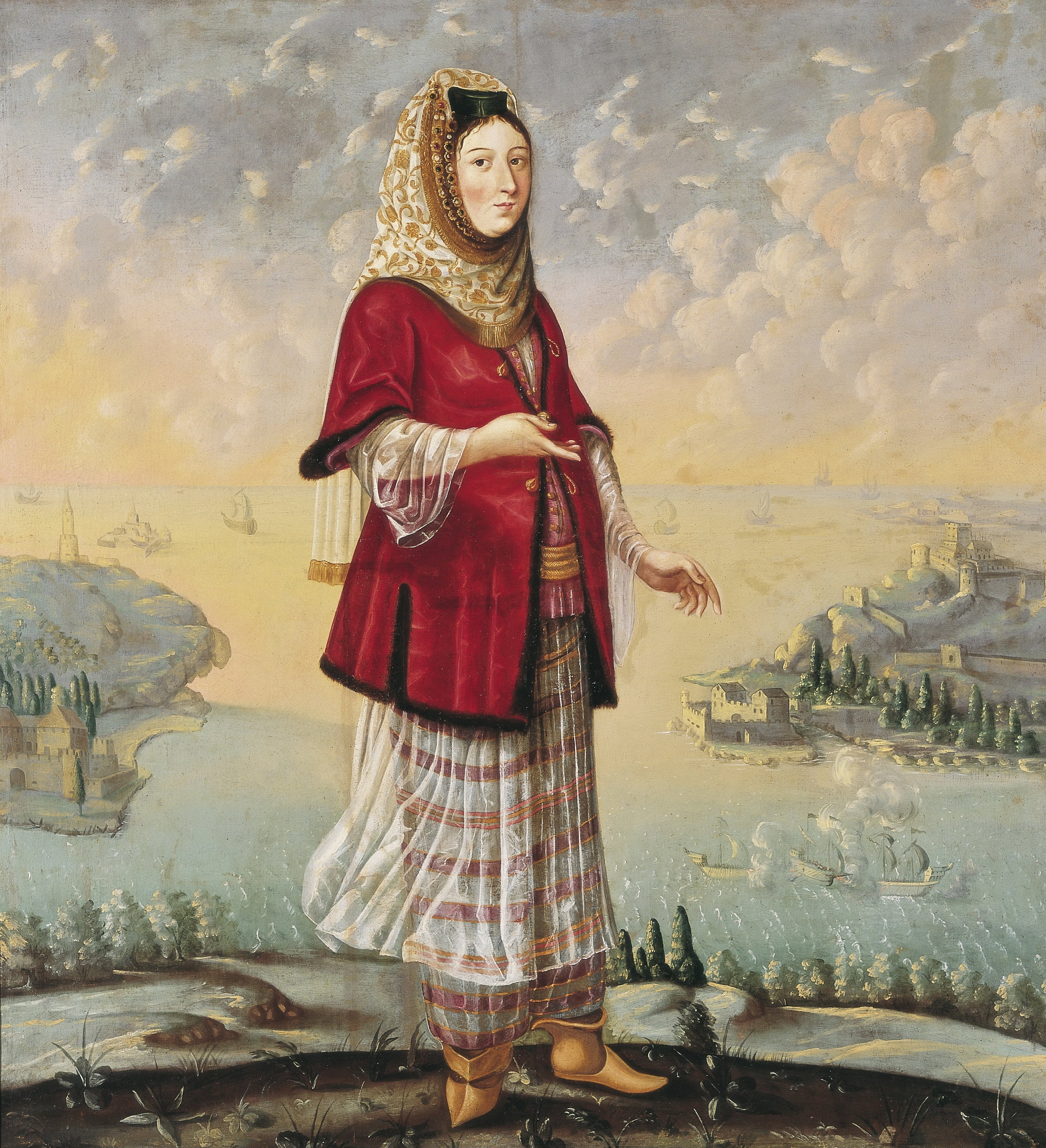
Painting of an Armenian woman (circa 1682)

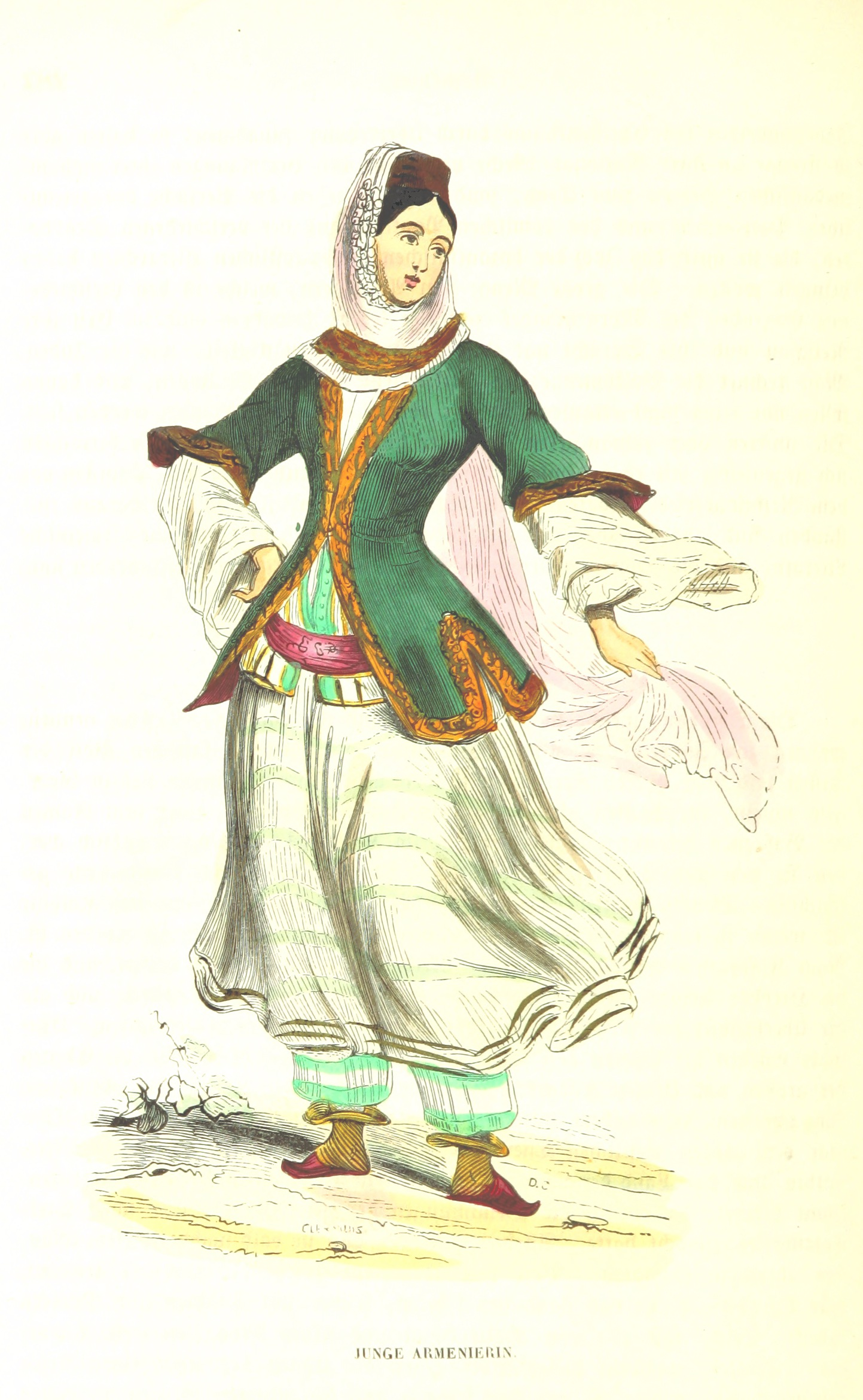
Armenian women painting (1845)

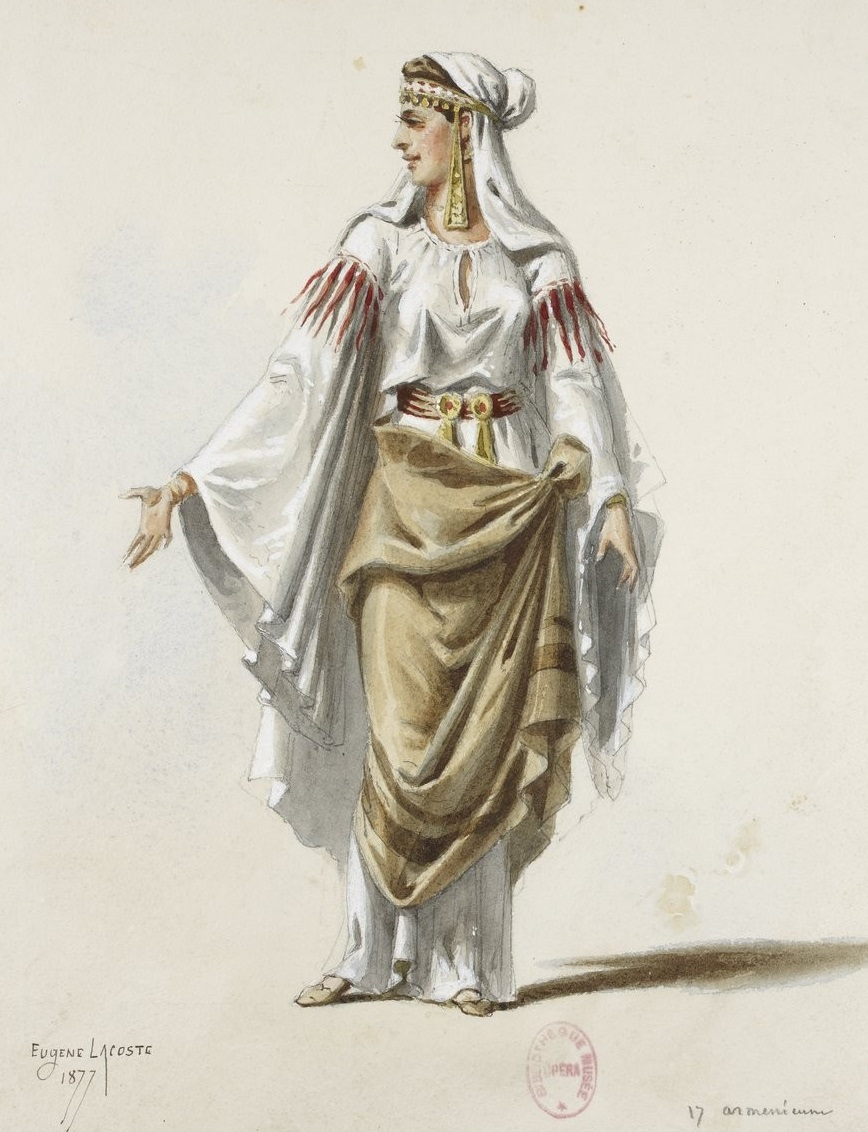
Ancient Armenian women by Eugène Lacoste (circa 1877)

In 2022, Armenia ranked 1st worldwide for having the highest percentage of women as percentage of the workforce (52.76%).

According to the 2018 Grant Thornton International business survey, the proportion of senior roles held by women in Armenia went slightly up from 31% to 32%. However, no improvement was recorded among the surveyed Armenian businesses in diversity in management positions: 17% having no women in senior roles (10% in 2017)".

Based on 2021 data provided by Georgetown Institute for Women, Peace and Security, among countries in Central and Eastern Europe, Armenia’s performance on women’s financial inclusion in business has been at 40.9%, compared to the minimum score in the region assigned to Azerbaijan (27.7%) and the maximum score in Estonia (98.4%).

Based on a report by the United Nations, there were 24 female mayors and community leaders in Armenia in 2011; a further 50 women held lower-level administrative positions.

President Nikol Pasinyan, elected 8 May 2018, has shown support for social programs including women’s rights.

== Traditional status ==
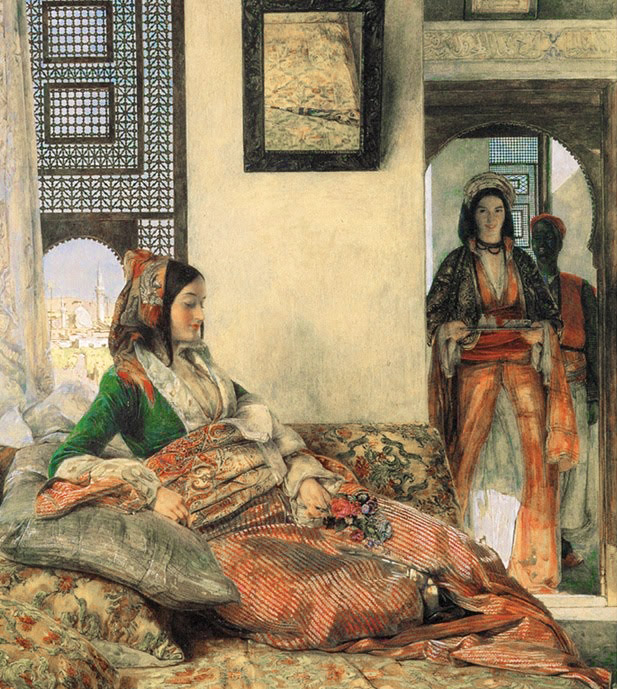
Armenian lady from Cairo, 1855

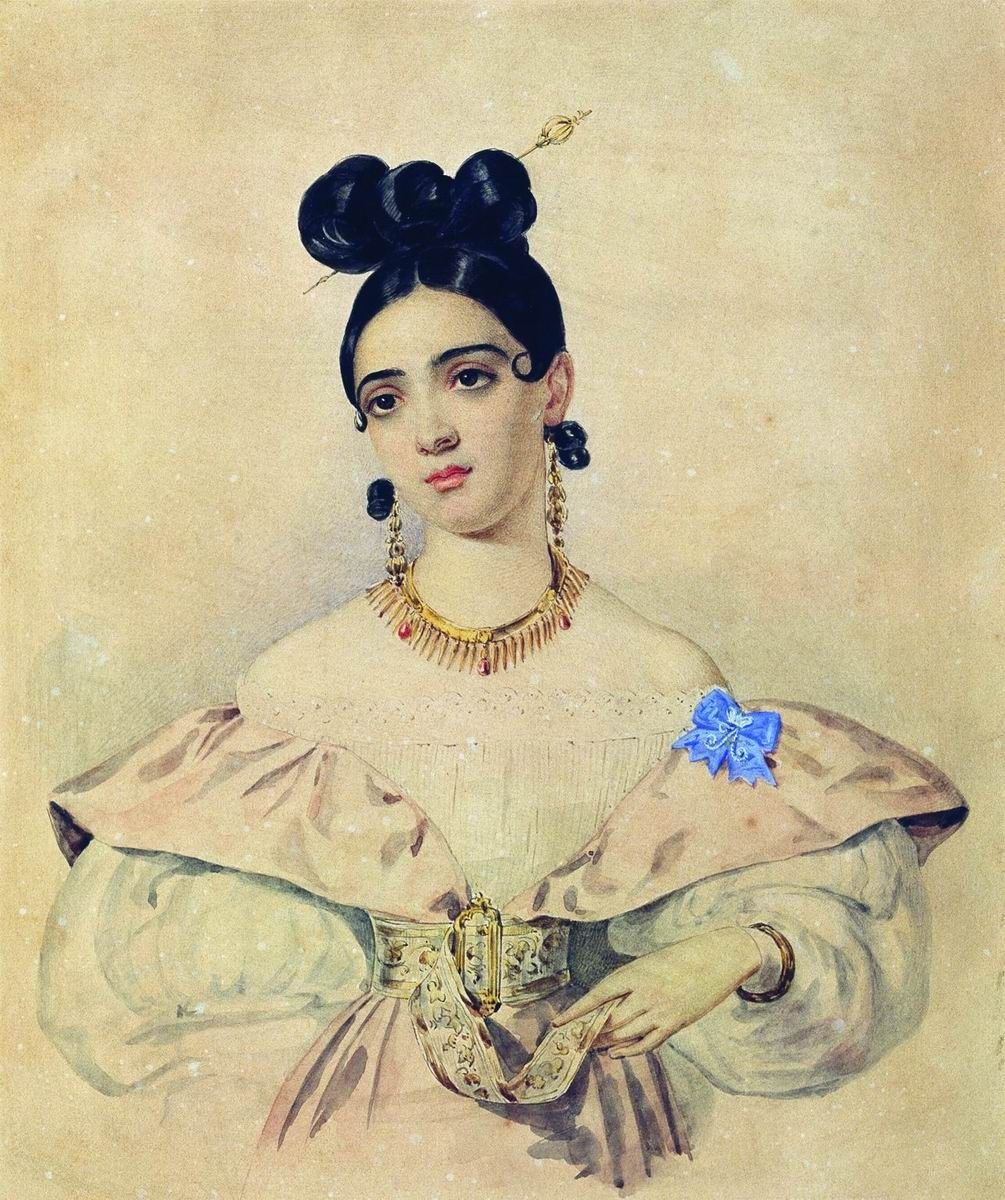
Anna Davidovna Abamelik-Lazareva, was recognized as one of the most beautiful women of Russia of her times

Some Armenian intellectuals, like Sibil, viewed ancient Armenian society and laws as woman-centric in line with the common trend of 19th century reformers who saw women as guardians of ancient, national culture, "many reformers idealised the civilization of a distant past, speaking of the need to regain the lost freedom that women were once said to have possessed in their societies”. The law code of Mkhitar Gosh, dating to the 12th century, sought to raise women's status from its former level, however the code explicitly enshrined male domination and forbade divorce, even in the case of domestic violence or marital rape. Its most progressive elements seem to have never been applied in society at large, and in the 18th and 19th centuries both outsider and insider reports overwhelmingly commented on the low status of women in traditional Armenian society. Armenian families were traditionally patrilocal, labor in the house was divided based on gender and generation. The rigidity of this hierarchy was best illustrated by the subordinate position of the new bride.

In some regions of Armenia, after marriage, brides initially had restrictions placed on their speech, like not being permitted to speak to some anyone except their husbands, or being forbidden to speak in the presence of their husband or inlaws; they might also be forbidden from leaving the house. Families would often physically attack women breaking the taboos. Young Armenian brides created a sign language called Harsnerēn, which translates to "Language of the Bride." It is a gesture based sign language that developed against the rule of silence imposed on married Armenian women. Not all women constrained to silence used it. Speech restrictions varied in extent and length; the extent and length might be set by local tradition (for instance, until the birth of the first child, or the death of parents-in-law), but could also be set by familial permission. In some cases, these restrictions could last decades; some women died before their inlaws gave them permission to speak again.

In the beginning of the 18th century among the Armenian population in Transcaucasia female suicide was more common than male suicide, in contrast to the situation in the West, where male suicides were 3 to 4 times more common.

In spite of the inferior position of women in Armenian society, the Armenian Apostolic Church allowed women greater opportunities for assuming clerical roles than most other Christian traditions. Unlike the Eastern Orthodox, however, they were strongly opposed to divorce, and as a result the divorce rate in traditional Armenia has always been among the lowest in the Christian world.

== Violence against women ==
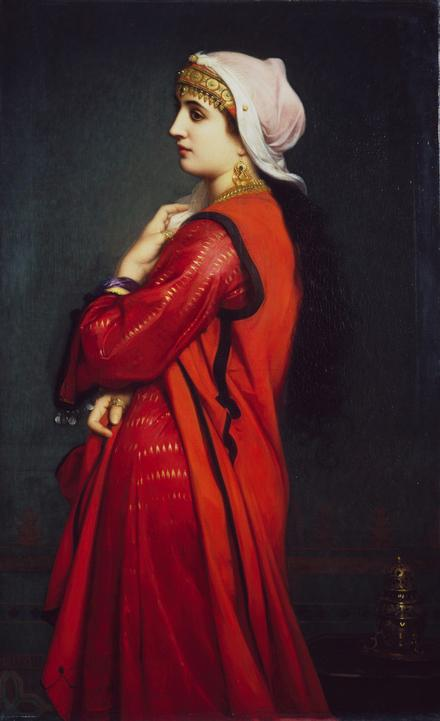
An Armenian Woman (19th century, author Charles Landelle)

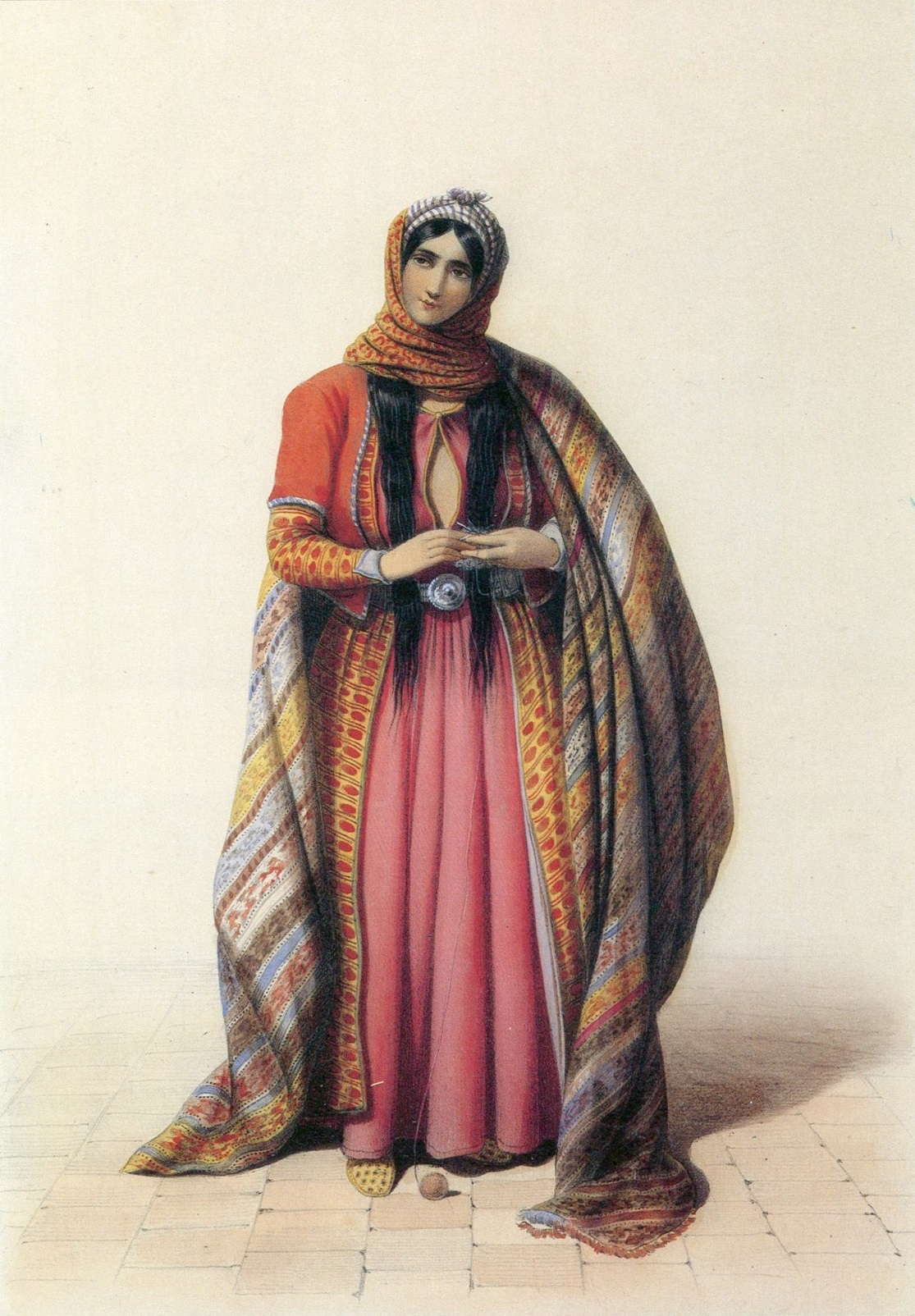
Armenian lady from Isfahan, 1850

According to the United Nations Global Database on Violence against Women, 8.2% of Armenian women suffered domestic abuse and violence in 2021.

Armenia has been lacking well-established laws against domestic aggression and gender-based prejudice as noted by UHCR in 2010.

Following the Velvet Revolution, the new government has taken some steps to combat domestic violence. In 2018, the Ministry of Social Affairs and Labour established the Domestic Violence Council, in order to develop bylaws and regulations to enforce the Law on Domestic Violence and develop response mechanisms to handle cases of domestic violence. In 2019, decrees were signed to establish shelters, develop regional crisis centres and establish clear protocols to address cases in each province, and create a support fund for survivors.

== Political status ==
The First Republic of Armenia established in 1918 held elections under universal suffrage, electing three women deputies: Katarine Zalyan-Manukyan, Perchuhi Partizpanyan-Barseghyan and Varvara Sahakyan to its first parliament of 80 seats. In 1920, Diana Abgar was appointed Honorary Consul of the First Republic of Armenia to Japan, making history as the 1st woman diplomat in the country & one of the 1st-ever women in the world to occupy a diplomatic post.

During the Soviet years the true political power was held by the Politburo of the Communist Party, with the Supreme Soviet functioning more like a rubber stamp. It had a quota for women - on average one-third of deputies at the all-union and union republic levels were women, however in reality they had no significant political power. After the collapse of the Soviet Union in 1991 and establishment of independent states with free elections the quota system was abolished, which brought to a significant drop in the number of women elected in post-soviet years.

In May 2007, through the legislative decree known as "the gender quota law", more Armenian women were encouraged to get involved in politics. That year, only seven women occupied parliamentary positions. Among these female politicians was Hranush Hakobyan, the longest-serving woman in the National Assembly of Armenia. The relative lack of women in Armenia's government led to Armenian women being considered "among the most underrepresented" and "among the lowest in the world" by foreign observers in 2007. In addition, Armenian women's place in politics was often located in the private sphere - their entry in the public sphere only valued when they reflected the image of the feminine ideal based on social expectations, which continue to put a barrier on the political, social, and economic accessibility for women. In 2015, Arpine Hovhannisyan, became the first female Justice Minister in Armenia, a role she held until 2017. Anna Vardapetyan became the first female Prosecutor General of Armenia in 2022.

Female representation in the Parliament has been growing steadily in Armenia in the last decade and currently represents the highest percentage in the South Caucasus (35.51%) compared to neighbouring Georgia (18.44%) and Azerbaijan (18.64%).

== Health and welfare ==
In 2010 and 2011, during Women's Month and as part of the "For You, Women" charitable program, the Surb Astvatcamayr Medical Center in the Armenian capital of Yerevan offered free gynecological and surgical services to the women of Armenia for a full month. Women from across the country arrived seeking treatment.

== Sex-selective abortion ==
Sex-selective abortion is reported as being a problem in the country, due to patriarchal social norms which consider having a son preferable to having a daughter. Nevertheless, due to strong emigration under the form of "brain drain", where young Armenian men go abroad in search of work, there are more young women than men in the country, especially among those in their 20s: women make up 55.8% of the population aged 15–29.

== Literature ==
The oldest literary expression by Armenian women available to us today in writing is the poetry of two 8th-century CE women, Khosrovidukht of Goghtn and Sahakdukht of Syunik. Following the Armenian literary renaissance of the 19th century, and the spread of educational opportunities for women, a number of other writers emerged, among them the 19th-century feminist writer Srpouhi Dussap, considered the first female Armenian novelist. She, like her contemporary, Zabel Sibil Asadour, is generally associated with Constantinople and the Western Armenian literary tradition. Zabel Yesayan, also born in Constantinople, bridged the gap with Eastern Armenian literature by settling in Soviet Armenia in 1933. The literary renaissance and its accompanying voice of protest also had its representatives in the East with poet Shushanik Kurghinian(1876–1927) of Aleksandrapol (today, Gyumri). Sylvia Kaputikyan and Maro Markarian are probably the best-known women poets from the Republic of Armenia of the 20th century, and continued the tradition of political speech through poetry.

== Soviet Armenia ==
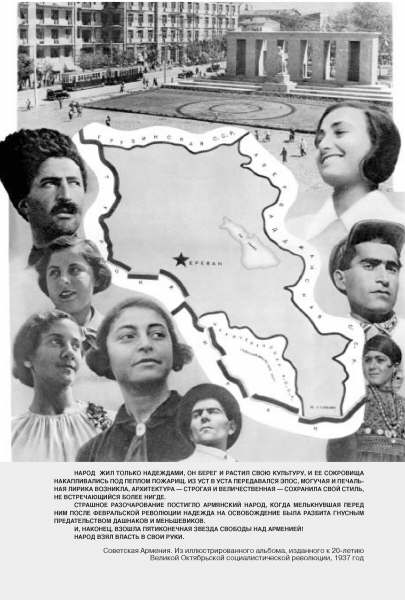
A 1937 propaganda poster glorifying Soviet Armenia prominently depicts Armenian women.

Upon the formation of the Soviet Union, the new government wished to radically reconstruct society by tackling economic, social, and political questions. In this attempt, Party leaders brought up the “woman question.” Many argued that the emergence of the woman from the private sphere of the home into the economic and political world was an essential change necessary for building towards a communist future.

Thus, Soviet legislation was adopted during the early 1920s that established civil marriage, easy divorce, abortion services, maternity pay, and childcare facilities. Women were given equal rights to hold land, act as heads of households, be members in rural communes, and perform paid labor.

=== Labor ===
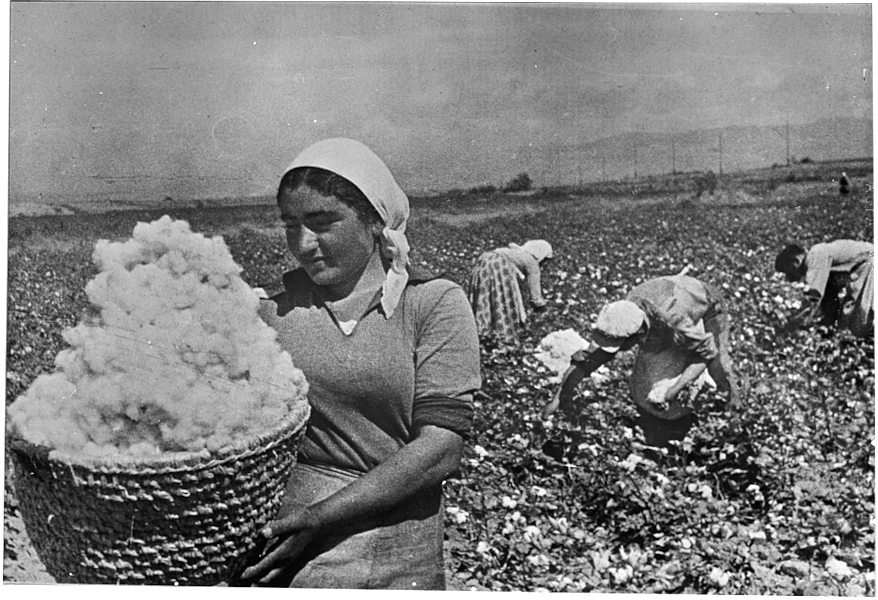
Women harvesting cotton in Armenia in the 1930s.

Although there were equal pay laws set in place, this did not translate into true labor equality for women. Women were laboring under the “double burden” — the responsibility to perform paid labor was simply added on top of their existing responsibility to perform unpaid domestic labor.

Gender-based segregation in labor also proved to become a persistent issue. Men dominated positions in heavy industry — metallurgy, mining, high-level positions in government, the army, and the police. Women, on the other hand, populated spheres like textiles, electronics, food-processing, service, health, education, and culture industries. Even in those spheres, women were rarely given managerial positions. By the 1980s women comprised 50.9% of all workers in the Soviet Union. But even so, in the late 1980s in Armenia, this gendered division of labor caused a pay difference of 500-700 rubles a month for most men and 120-130 rubles a month for most women.

=== Education ===
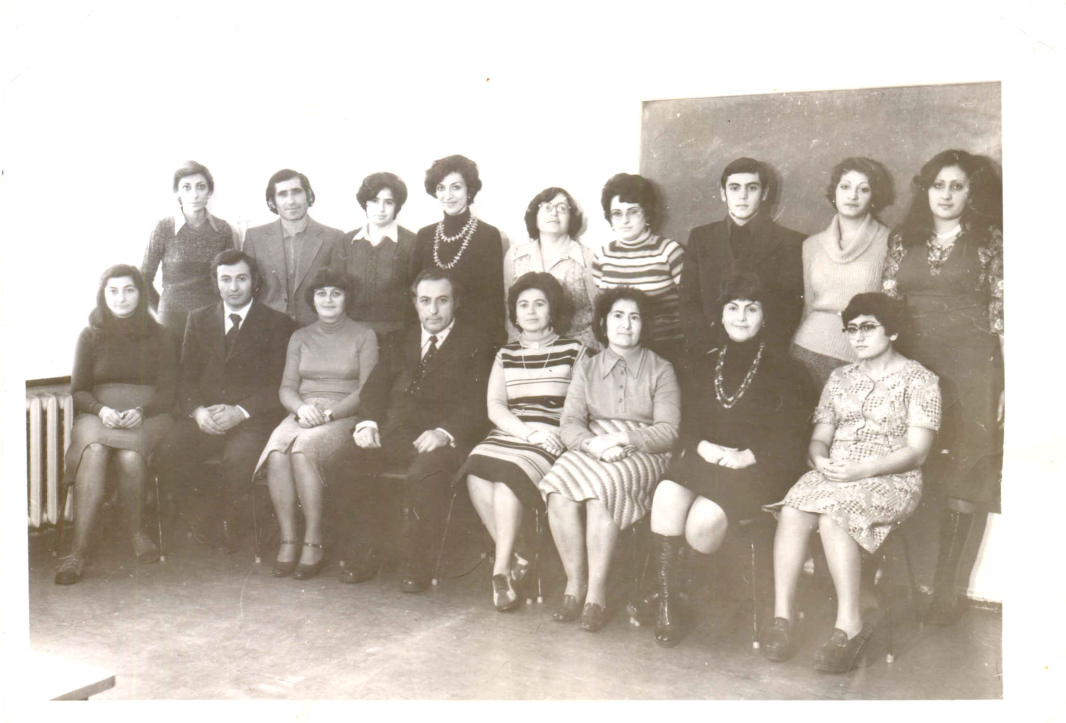
Students? and neurologist Gabriel Khachatryan, 1981

The Soviet Union introduced free universal primary education in the 1930s, universal eight-year education in the 1950s, and universal secondary education in the 1970s.

Furthermore, throughout Central Asia and the Caucasus, the Soviet government established women’s clubs, workers’ clubs, tea-houses, workshops, and “illiteracy liquidation centers,” which were all intended to “integrate” women into public life.

As a result of these changes, women quickly became universally literate and were oftentimes slightly “better” educated than men — in the 1980s, 61% of specialists with higher or secondary specialized education and 54% of students in higher education were women.

In Armenia specifically, by the 1980s, 51% of women received high education, 28% were awarded the “candidate degree,” and 35% of the people working at the Academy of Sciences were women.

=== Family ===
However, despite their accomplishments in higher education, not many Armenian women challenged gendered divisions of labor or the assumptions that constructed them. Most Soviet Armenian women continued to give precedence to their families. Some left their paid jobs to raise young children and then went back to work. Others chose less demanding jobs with fewer hours and lower pay in order to be able to have time to do both. This then contributed further to the gendered division of labor.

While the “double burden” was still ever-persistent, the Soviet government made a number of different attempts to regulate the traditional Armenian structure of a family — these attempts were of course aimed at women.

The Party leaders considered the traditional Armenian family structure to be “backwards.” In 1920s Armenia, Kinbazhin (the Armenian chapter of the Zhenotdel) representatives would visit homes with an intention of giving women “scientific” advice on raising children. During their visits, they would also attempt to build a relationship with the children and encourage them to report cases of child beating, wife beating, and forced marriages. Additionally, one of the many responsibilities of the Commission for the Improvement of the Way of Life of Women in Armenia, which was created in 1923, was to “see that Soviet legislation regarding the family and traditional offenses was put into effect.”

Even though Party leaders placed tremendous importance on dismantling the traditional family institution in Armenia, Armenian — and all Soviet — women were highly encouraged to have children. In the 1940s and 1950s (during and after WWII), couples were encouraged to have four or more children and those who did were rewarded with things like free milk, living stipends, and better homes. Women who had 10 or more children were also awarded a medal of honor, alongside the title of Heroine Mother of the Soviet Union.

=== Politics ===
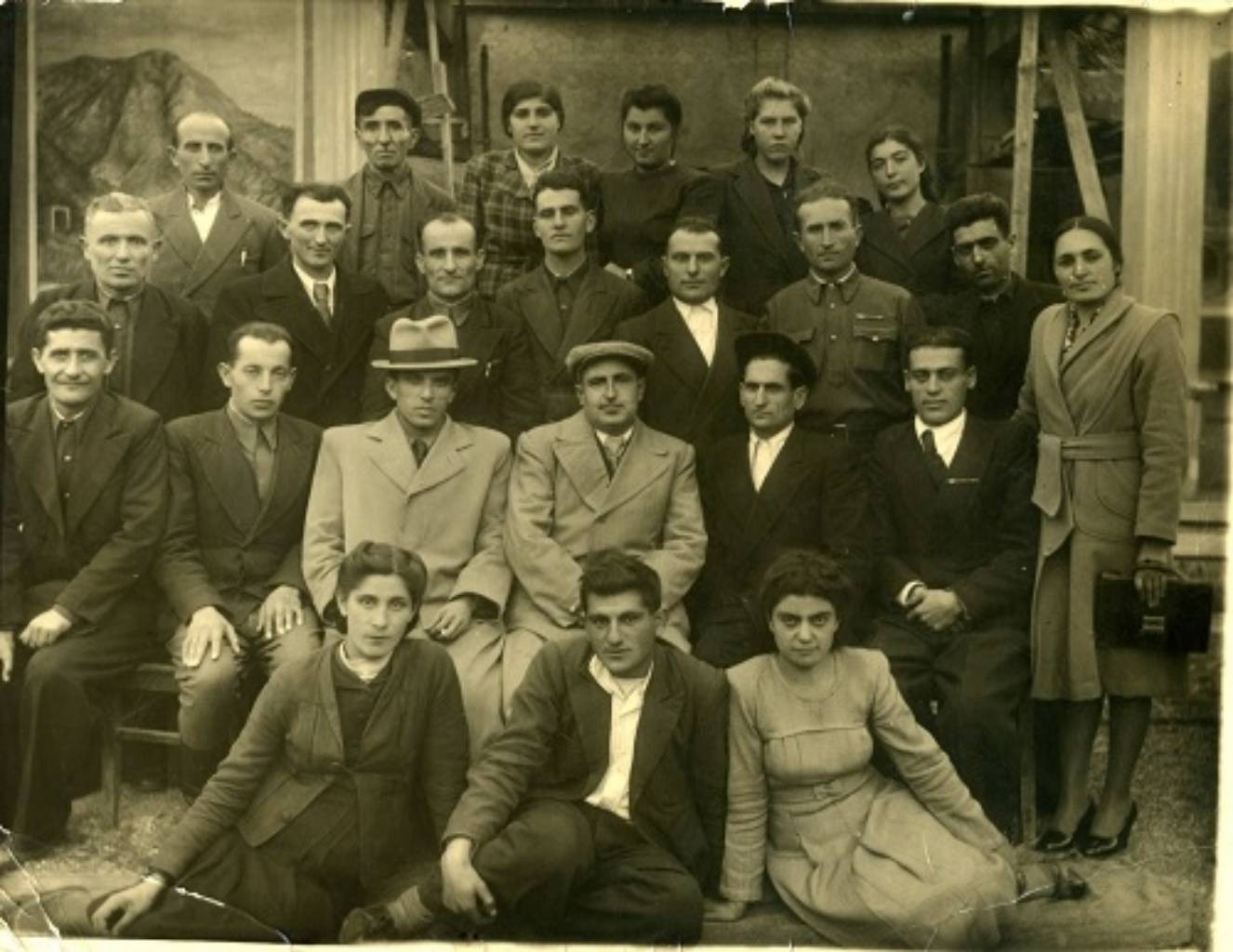
Kapan, 1949

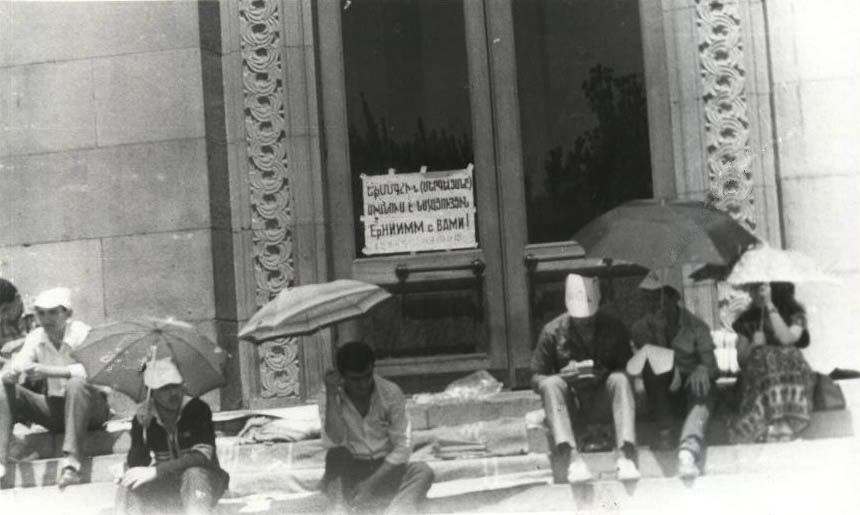
Protesting as part of the Karabakh movement in Yerevan in 1988

Alongside their attempts to weaken the traditional Armenian family institution, Soviet Party leaders developed many different methods through which they tried to get women educated in their rights and their responsibilities to the Party and to the state.

The above-mentioned Commission for the Improvement of the Way of Life of Women in Armenia was also tasked with advising government organs, conducting propaganda campaigns, and offering legal advice to women.

In 1956, during the 20th Party Congress, Khruschev spoke of the absence of women in prominent positions in government. During his time as Secretary of the Communist Party, he created the Zhensovety (women’s councils) which were intended to serve the needs and interests of women by developing the “New Communist Women” educated in the “high moral principles needed for building communism.”

A quota system was introduced by the state to maintain a representation of women at all levels of government. Despite this, women rarely ever held leadership positions at higher levels of government. Almost immediately after the fall of the Soviet Union, women completely withdrew from political positions in Armenia and most other formerly Soviet Republics, the quota systems not having done much to actively change pre-conceived notions about women being involved in politics. Armenian women have expressed their contempt for the Soviet quota system, stating that it was harmful to the women’s movement, as it appointed “compliant rather than capable women.”

Armenian women’s involvement in the Karabakh Movement of 1988 cannot be overlooked. During this time of national distress, women marched out onto the streets alongside men to demonstrate in support of political change, in a display of a “genderless festival of goodwill and optimism.” One of the most prominent women deputies during the Perestroika and later the post-soviet Russia, Galina Starovoitova, was first elected as a representative from Armenia in the Supreme Soviet and pursued several initiatives to help solve the problem of Nagorno Karabakh.

== See also ==
- Armenians (ethnic group)
- Mother Armenia
- Politics of Armenia
- Crime in Armenia
- Union of Producers and Women
- Armenia women's national football team
- Women in Europe
- Women in Asia
