= Artemis (magazine) =

Armenian women's literary journal

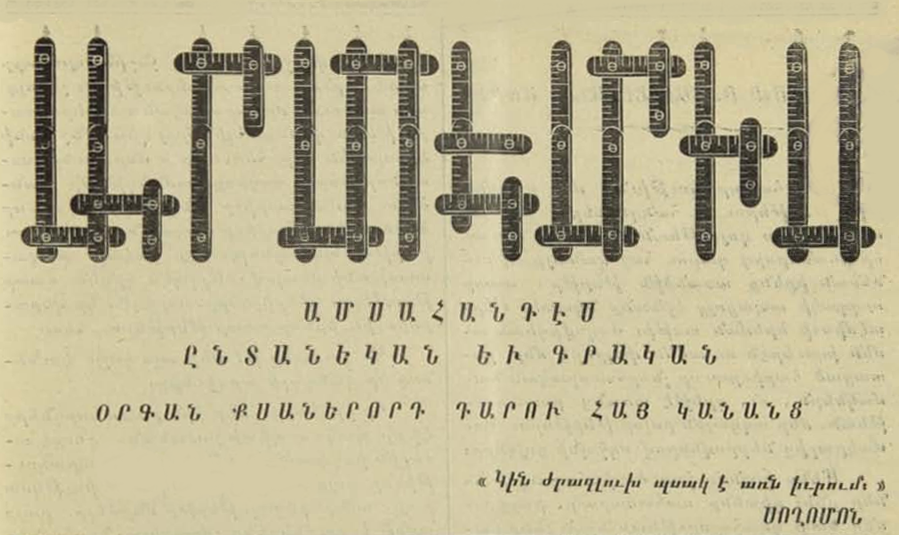
- Editor: Marie Beylerian
- Publisher: Marie Beylerian
- Founded: January 1902
- Final issue: December 1903
- Country: Egypt
- Based in: Alexandria
- Language: Armenian language

Artemis was one of the first Armenian women's literary magazines. It was published and edited in Alexandria, Egypt by Marie Beylerian from January 1902 to December 1903. For Beylerian, the publication was the realization of a lifelong dream of creating a magazine where Armenian women could freely express themselves. At a time when women were beginning to enter the public sphere, Artemis provided a platform where women could publish their own opinions about the contemporary lives of Armenian women. Contributions were sent to Artemis from all corners of the diaspora, including Kars, Nor Jugha (in Isfahan), Tbilisi, Moscow, Paris, and New York City. The magazine was praised throughout the Armenian diaspora and attracted many contributors from the diaspora's ranks.
