= Ofoase-Kokoben =

Ofoase-Kokoben O.K
- District Capital
- Nickname: O.K
- Location in Ghana
- Coordinates: 6°30′N 1°35′W
- Country: Ghana
- Region: Ashanti Region
- District: Atwima Kwanwoma District

Ofoase-Kokoben is a town in the Bekwai Municipal District district in the Ashanti Region of Ghana. This small town emanated from two different towns: Ofoase which was in the North and Kokoben in the South. They were separate communities with their leaders, but had a very cordial relationship. They decided to settle close to the main road when the Kumasi to Bekwai route was redirected from Senfi via Dominasi to Anwiankwanta, which are also communities within the same District. These two communities decided to come together under one umbrella with the twin name OFOASE-KOKOBEN, nicknamed as O.K.
