= Kinbazhin =

Kinbazhin (Armenian: Կինբաժին), was a women's organization in Armenia, founded in 1920. It was the Armenian chapter of the Zhenotdel, and had the task to introduce the new role of women in Armenian SSR. While it did not fully achieve the ideal Communist society, it did achieve a revolutionary change in the life of women in Armenia.

== History ==
When Armenia belonged to Russia, the Armenian women's movement was very weak. While secondary education school for girls existed in Armenia from 1850, the majority of women lived a very traditional life, and when Armenia became a part of the Soviet Union in 1920, the situation of women in Armenia was seen as among the lower among the soviet republics. As in other soviet republics, the authorities introduced a woman's chapter of the Zhenotdel to introduce the reforms in women's position.

=== Policy and activity ===
The Soviet vision was that Armenian women should leave the traditional gender segregation, stop covering their faces, educate themselves, became politically schooled and start to work and contribute to the economy, and the policy was to provide women with day-care for children and encourage men to share household work to make this possible. The Kinbazhin made home visits and informed women of their role in society and the new rights afforded to them in order to fulfil them and assisted them in order to use them; among these rights being women's rights to education, professional rights, the right to be promoted, day-care for children, contraception and abortion.

=== Dissolution ===
In 1930, the Zhenotdel was abolished because it was the official opinion of the Soviet State that gender equality had now been successfully introduced in the Soviet Union, which also resulted in abolition of its equaivalents in the separate soviet republics, such as the Kinbazhin of Armenia.
