= Tabitha Sybil Quaye =

Ghanaian politician

Hon. Tabitha Sybil Quaye

Member of the Ghana Parliament for Takoradi
- In office January 1992 – January 1997
- President: Jerry John Rawlings
- Preceded by: William N. Gram
- Succeeded by: Gladys Asmah

Personal details
- Born: September 20, 1938 (age 87)
- Party: National Democratic Congress
- Education: Hotel and Catering Institute
- Occupation: Politician
- Profession: Hotelier and Caterer

Tabitha Sybil Quaye (born 20 September 1938) is a Ghanaian politician and a former member of parliament for Takoradi in the Western region. She was a member of the first parliament of the fourth republic of Ghana.

== Early life and education ==
Tabitha Sybil Quaye was born in 1938 in the Western Region of Ghana. She has a Diploma in Catering from the Hotel and Catering Institute.

== Career ==
She is a former member of parliament for Takoradi from January 1992 to January 1997 and also a Hotelier and a Caterer.

== Politics ==
Tabitha Sybil Quaye was elected during the 1992 Ghanaian parliamentary election as member of the first parliament of the fourth republic of Ghana on the ticket of the National Democratic Congress. She succeeded William N. Gram of the Action Congress Party (ACP) who represented the constituency in 1979 Ghanaian parliamentary election. She was succeeded by Gladys Asmah member of New Patriotic Party during the 1996 Ghanaian general election who won the seat by polling 26,431 votes which represented 73.50% of the share. She defeated Esther Nkansah a National Democratic Congress (NDC) member who polled 10,342 votes which represented 23.00% of the share, Alex Fosu Blankson an Independent who polled 1,323 votes which represented 2.90% of the share, Timothy Norbert Kublenu of National Convention Party(NCP) who also polled 792 votes which represented 1.80% and Crosby Mochia of Convention People's Party (CPP) who had no vote.

== Personal life ==
She is a Christian.
