= Eli Jones (Quaker) =

American Quaker preacher

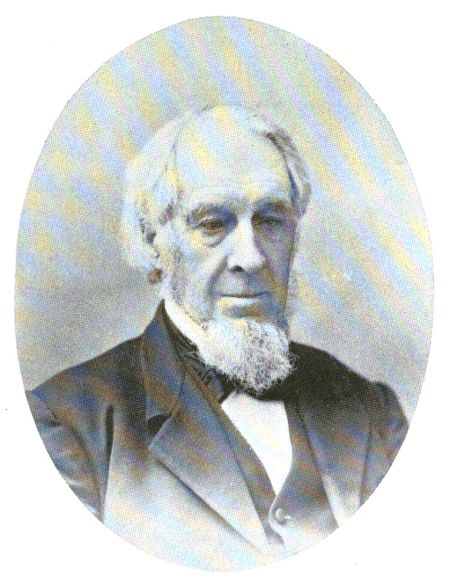
Eli Jones.

Eli Jones (1807–1890) was an American Quaker preacher.

== Lineage ==
Eli Jones was born at China Lake, about twelve miles from Augusta, Maine, in 1807, the son of Abel and Susannah (Jepson) Jones, a descendant of Captain Jones, who commanded the Mayflower, a trading man in the colony of the "Pilgrim Fathers" and a "convinced Friend". The genealogical table of the family of Jones would in itself fill a volume. For generations they held their position and worked among the Welsh Hills, Welsh John succeeding Welsh John and being called John's Son, until in the course of time the name narrowed down into that of Jones, and the first of the family, who emigrated to America, was the commander of the Mayflower in 1620, and subsequently, when the Pilgrim and Puritan colonies were in a prosperous condition, three brothers, bearing the name Jones, settled in America—one on the Androscoggin River, six miles from Brunswick, in the township of Durham, District of Maine; he was the father of Abel Jones. A large number of Friends were collected in this vicinity and a meeting-house was built near by, and great numbers of Friends from a distance attended the quarterly and monthly meetings at this place. When Abel Jones had attained manhood he resolved to settle farther north, and left his father's estates and made a home for himself at "Twelve-Mile Pond", now China Lake, which was first settled in 1774 by a family of four brothers named Clark. Two of these brothers were Friends. The first meeting of this society held in China was about 1803, in the private house where, in 1806, Abel Jones married Susannah Jepson.

== Life ==
Eli Jones, their son, had but poor educational advantages; in China books were not to be had, and the Bible was almost the only book attainable wherewith he could gratify his thirst for knowledge, and from constant reading of the Bible at an early age he consequently became a proficient Biblical scholar. He attended a school near his home, but the terms were short, and the teachers themselves hardly proficient in the rudiments—as, for instance, one of the teachers after working two days on a problem of long division gave the result to Eli Jones, saying, "I know that is right now, but I can't explain it to you or tell you why it is done that way." In the winter of 1827 he was given the benefit of the charitable fund at the Friends' School in Providence, Rhode Island. He had only three months there, however, as he divided the half-year with another scholar, and also lost much of his time by a serious attack of typhoid fever. Soon after this he returned home, and at the Chadwick Schoolhouse in China first began to speak in the public assemblies of the Society of Friends. He was at the time less than fourteen years of age, but was afterward often heard, and encouraged by the older Friends to deliver his message when impressed. About this time he also organized a temperance society, of which he was secretary, which organization was established two years before the Washington movement was started, and it exerted a marked influence in the state, and no doubt its force was felt in the enactment of the "Maine Law". He died in 1890.

== Personal life ==
In 1833 Eli Jones was married to Sybil Jones, and henceforth his life and works were so closely united with hers that their record in history is one.

== See also ==
- Eli and Sybil Jones House

== Sources ==
- Jones, Rufus M. (1899). Eli and Sibyl Jones, Their Life and Work. Philadelphia, PA: Porter & Coates.

Attribution:
