= Sahakdukht =

8th-century Armenian hymnographer, poet and pedagogue

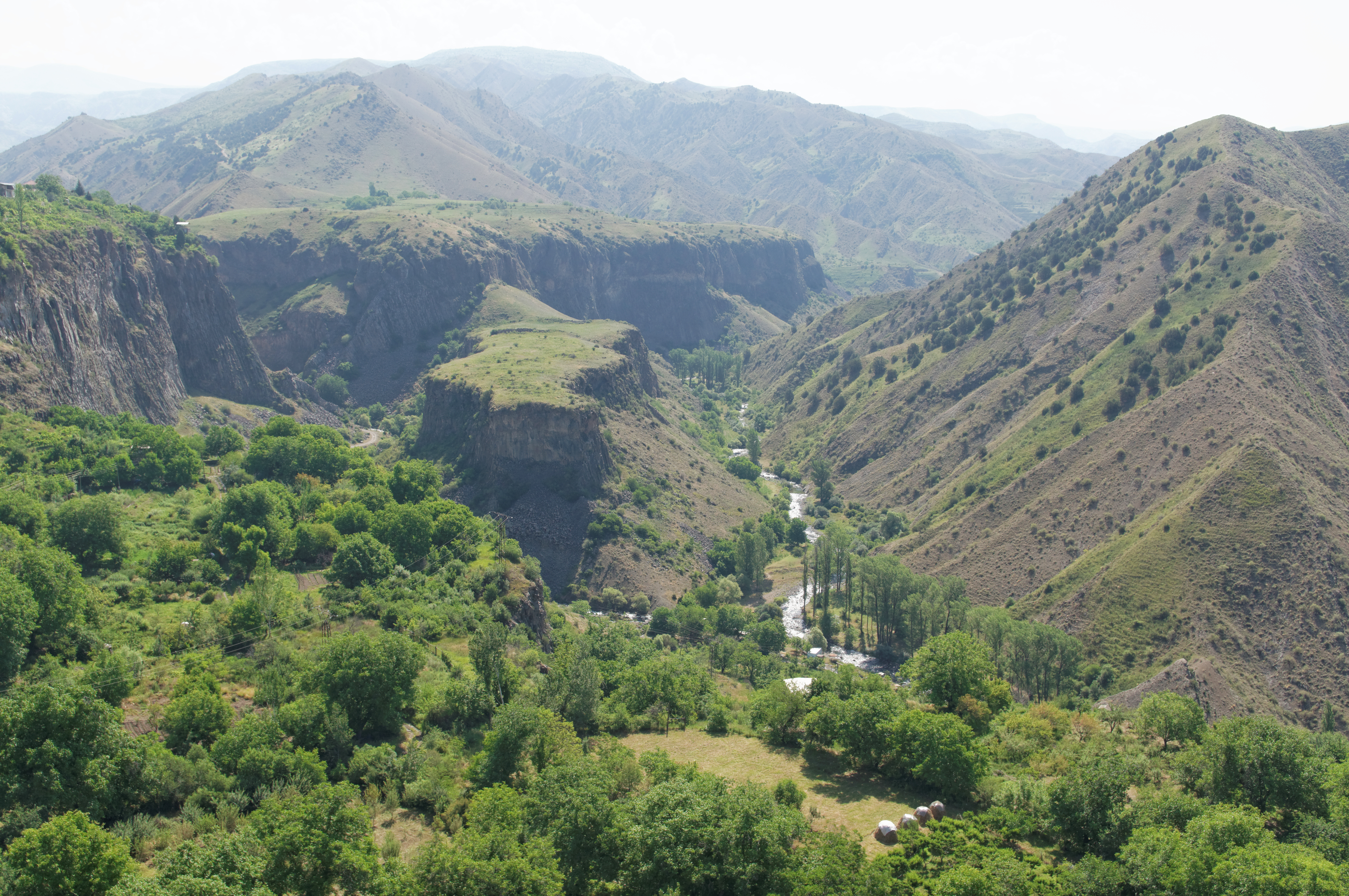
The Garni valley, where Sahakdukht spent much of her life as an ascetic living in a cave.

Sahakdukht (Note: Sahakdukht's name is also spelled as Sahakdoukht, or Sahakduxt. Some sources refer to her as Sahakdoukht Siunetsi in reference to her brother Stepanos Siunetsi; 'Siunetsi' means "of Siunik".) (Armenian: Սահակադուխտ, lit. 'daughter of Sahak'; fl. early 8th century) was an Armenian hymnographer, poet and pedagogue who lived during the early 8th century. She is the first known woman of Armenian literature and music. Along with her slightly later contemporary Khosrovidukht, she is among the earliest woman composers in history.

Sahakdukht and her brother Stepanos Siunetsi, who became a noted composer and music theorist, were educated in Dvin. She then spent her life as an ascetic, living in a cave (a grotto) of the Garni valley where she wrote and taught music. Though she is said to have written much Christian music, particularly for the Virgin Mary, only a single sharakan (canonical hymn) survives, the acrostic "Srbuhi Mariam" ("Saint Mary"). The work shows considerable stylistic connections to contemporaneous Byzantine theotokions and kanons. Though her piece did not join the general sharakan liturgy, Sahakdukht's oeuvre as a whole is thought to have exerted considerable influence on subsequent sharakans; they introduced certain phrases into popular use and according to ethnomusicologist Şahan Arzruni they "helped to shape the development of the genre during subsequent centuries".

== Life ==
Extremely little is known about the life of Sahakdukht, also spelled as Sahakdoukht, or Sahakduxt. The information available is chiefly from an account of 13th-century historian Stepanos Orbelian. Active in the early 8th century, her brother was the composer and music theorist Stepanos Siunetsi, known for his sharakans (canonical hymns). Both Sahakdukht and her brother were educated at a cathedral school in the city of Dvin. She then spent her life as an ascetic, living in a cave (a grotto) of the Garni valley, near present-day Yerevan. (Note: 'Garni' is also spelled 'Karni'.) There she produced ecclesiastical poems as well as liturgical chants. Sahakdukht is said to have taught music to children and amateur adults from Garni. Due to the conventions of her time, Sahakdukht gave such instruction while seated behind a curtain. In 1909, the Armenian poet and writer Sibil used Sahakdukht's role as a teacher to promote education for women, saying in a speech that:

1200 years ago the Armenian took great interest in women's education. It may come as a surprise when I say that Stephan Siunetsi's sister, Sahakdukht, established a music school in eighth-century Armenia; today such schools, which are the mark of a civilized nation, do not exist.

— Sibil, 1909

== Works ==
External audio
- A brief introduction and reading of "Srbuhi Mariam" by Sargis Najaryan
- "Srbuhi Mariam"

Sahakdukht is recognized as the first known woman composer and poet of Armenia, followed by her slightly later contemporary Khosrovidukht. She purportedly wrote many now-lost Christian religious compositions, including ktsurds (antiphons and anthems), sharakans and other melodies. The poetry for such genres included both rhyme and fixed verse. Sources say that such works were often written for the Virgin Mary, making them roughly equivalent to the contemporaneous Byzantine tradition of theotokions.

The only composition by Sahakdukht to survive is the sharakan "Srbuhi Mariam" ("Saint Mary"), an homage to Mary. It is a nine-stanza acrostic verse, where the first letter of each quatrain spells out 'Sahakdukht'. This piece is aligned stylistically with sharakans of the 'Metzatsustse' (Magnificat) type. In addition, "Srbuhi Mariam"—and presumably much of Sahakdukht's lost oeuvre—is modeled after the Byzantine kanon like the works of her brother. This may be explained by the fact that Stepanos lived in Constantinople for many years, where Germanus I, an important proponent of early kanons, was active. See Hovanessian & Margossian (1978, pp. 45–47) for an English translation of "Srbuhi Mariam". Some scholars, including Ghevont Alishan, Malachia Ormanian and Grigor Hakobian attribute Khosrovidukht's sharakan "Zarmanali e indz" to Sahakdukht instead.

Like the sole surviving work of Khosrovidukht, Sahakdukht's sharakan has not garnered a position in the official collection of sharakans. It is not found among the apocryphal sharakans either. Nevertheless, Sahakdukht's sharakans are thought to have had a considerable impact on subsequent generations; ethnomusicologist Şahan Arzruni notes that they "helped to shape the development of the genre during subsequent centuries". In addition, according to historian Agop Jack Hacikyan, phrases appearing in "Srbuhi Mariam" such as "incorruptible temple," "ray of divine light," and "tree of life" have since become standard and popular in Armenian religious poetry and music.

"Srbuhi Mariam" ("Սրբուհի՜ Մարիամ")

Սըրբուհի՛ Մարիամ,
Անապական տաճար
Եւ կենարար բանին ծընող և մա՛յր.
Օրհնեա՛լ ես դու ի կանայս,
Բերկրեալ տիրամայր և կո՛յս։

Անդաստան հոգևոր և համապայծառ ծաղիկ,
Որ ի հոգեհոս անձրևէն՝ հովանաւորեալ ի քեզ,
Պըտղաբերեցեր ի հօրէ՝ յայտնեալ մարդկան.
Օրհնեա՛լ ես դու ի կանայս,
Բերկրեալ տիրամայր և կո՛յս։

Հաստատութիւն երկնի և երկրի,
Կենդանութեանց բաշխող,
Որ աստուածային լուսով ճառագայթիւքըն վայր իջեալ՝
Վերականգնեաց ըզնախահայրն ի գլորմանէ.
Օրհնեա՛լ ես դու ի կանայս,
Բերկրեալ տիրամայր և կո՛յս։

Աստանօր երկինք ի յերկրի երևեցար
Եւ վեհագոյն քըրովբէից,
Որ զերկնային զօրացն ըզտէրն
Ի գիրկըս քո բարձեալ կրեցեր.
Օրհնեա՛լ ես դու ի կանայս,
Բերկրեալ տիրամայր և կո՛յս։

Կենացն փայտիւն հորդեցեր մեզ ճանապարհ
Ի սրովբէափակ պահպանութենէ
Եւ զբոցեղէն ըզսուրըն կապտեցեր.
Օրհնեա՛լ ես դու ի կանայս,
Բերկրեալ տիրամայր և կո՛յս։

Դո՛ւռն երկնից և է՛ջք աստուծոյ,
Խաղաղութեա՛նց միջնորդ,
Որ զնախամօրըն զԵւայի բարձեր զերկունըս՝
Տիրացեալ մահուն.
Օրհնեա՛լ ես դու ի կանայս,
Բերկրեալ տիրամայր և կո՛յս։

Ուրա՛խ լեր, բերկրեա՛լ, տէր ընդ քեզ ասելով
Էլ բազմութիւնք հոգեղինացըն
Հրաշալի ձայնիւ երգեն քեզ ըզբերկրումըն.
Օրհնեա՛լ ես դու ի կանայս,
Բերկրեալ տիրամայր և կո՛յս։

Հիւթական, եղական, անեղ բանին բընակարան,
Որ ըզհուրն աստուածութեան
Յորովայնի քում ընկալար և ոչ բոցակիզար
Որպէս որմըն ըզմորենին,
Այլ ծնար զաստուածըն բոլորից.
Օրհնեա՛լ ես դու ի կանայս,
Բերկրեալ տիրամայր և կո՛յս։

Խորհուրդ կենաց և փըրկութեան
Վերաթևող եղեր աշխարհի.
Երազապէս բարձրացուցեր ըզհողեղէնքս ընդ հոգեղէնսըն,
Ի բնակութիւնըս հրեշտակաց.
Օրհնեա՛լ ես դու ի կանայս,
Բերկրեալ տիրամայր և կո՛յս։

Տո՛ւք ըզփառըս ի բարձունըս
Թագաւորին յաւիտենից,
Որ եկն և մարմնացաւ ի սուր կուսէն
Եւ փըրկեաց զարարածըս ի մեղաց.
Օրհնեա՛լ ես դու ի կանայս,
Բերկրեալ տիրամայր և կո՛յս։

– Sahakdukht (8th century)
