= Shevawn Lynam =

Irish novelist and journalist (1914–1998)

- Born: Sybil Mary Joan Lynam; 16 April 1914; Dublin, Ireland
- Died: 4 November 1998 (aged 84); St Columcille's Hospital, Loughlinstown, County Dublin

Shevawn Lynam (born Dublin, 16 April 1914 - 4 November 1998) was an Irish novelist and journalist. She was the Spanish-language specialist with the BBC and Ministry of Information during World War II.

== Early life ==
Shevawn Lynam was the pen name of Joan Lynam (Shevawn is the anglicisation of 'Siobhan', the Gaelic version of 'Joan').

She was born Sybil Mary Joan Lynam in Dublin, Ireland on 16 April 1914. Her parents were Charles, engineer, and Margaret "Mai" Lynam (née Moran), both from Galway. She had one brother, Robert. When her parents separated, custody of the children was awarded to their father. Lynam moved around a lot as a child, living with her paternal grandmother, Agnes Lynam, in Connemara, County Galway, and later in France. She lived in Spain in her early twenties, probably working as a governess. She suffered from tuberculosis and was sent to a sanatorium in Switzerland for two years.

== Career ==
As a journalist, she covered the Spanish Civil War for The Irish Times. She worked as a secretary for various prominent artists and writers, including Alfred Hitchcock and John Betjeman. In the late 1940s, she wrote and hosted her own radio programme, called 'Hither and Yon', for the Irish national broadcaster Radio Éireann. She lived in Paris for ten years, working as the editor of the NATO Newsletter international affairs. Lynam also worked for the Marshall Plan and UNESCO. In 1963, she returned to Ireland to be the editorial publicity officer at the Irish Tourist Board until 1971.

She published an acclaimed biography of the eighteenth-century pioneer of animal rights Richard Martin, nicknamed the 'King of Connemara'. Her best-known work is her novel The Spirit and the Clay, a choral story which follows the lives of several Basque men and women working in the underground resistance against the Franco dictatorship, in the Basque Country. The novel is based on real-life stories retold to Lynam by a Basque priest in exile. It was translated to several languages. It was published in French as The Tree of Guernica.

== Death ==
She died in St Columcille's Hospital, Loughlinstown, County Dublin on 4 November 1998, and is buried at Shanganagh cemetery.
