= Sybil Baker Kelly =

Former North Dakota state legislator

Sybil Baker Kelly (August 27, 1896 - March 1, 1988) was a state legislator in North Dakota. She lived in Devils Lake, North Dakota. She attended the University of North Dakota. She married Milton Kelly and had five children. She served in the North Dakota House from 1959-1964. She was a Republican.

She served on the Governor's Commission on the Status of Women.
