= Gweneth Whitteridge =

British medical history scholar

Gweneth Whitteridge FRCP (20 October 1910 – 3 September 1993), a British scholar of medical history, was president of the History of Medicine Society of the Royal Society of Medicine of the United Kingdom from 1983 to 1985. She was an acknowledged authority on the English physician William Harvey and his works.

== Life ==
Gweneth Whitteridge was born on 20 October 1910 in London. Her father, Samuel Hutchings, was a corn merchant in London. Whitteridge was educated at City of London School for Girls, and then from 1929 studied mediaeval French at Lady Margaret Hall, Oxford. She then studied palaeography at the Sorbonne, returning to Oxford afterwards to complete her Bachelor of Arts, and then a DPhil on an Anglo-Norman text.

After lecturing in French at the University of Wales, Bangor and Oxford during the Second World War, Whitteridge was appointed as archivist to St Bartholomew's Hospital, London. She wrote a histories of the hospital in 1952 and again in 1963. Whitteridge became known as a world authority on English physician William Harvey. In 1953 Whitteridge was asked by Geoffrey Keynes to undertake the translation and transcription of an unpublished work of Harvey, De motu locali animalium. Her translation was published in 1959. She went on to translate other Harvey works, including Prelectiones anatomia universalis and De musculis. Whitteridge was elected a Fellow of the Academie Internationale de l’Histoire des Sciences and an honorary Fellow of the Royal College of Physicians. Whitteridge was president of the History of Medicine Society of the Royal Society of Medicine of the United Kingdom from 1983 to 1985.

Whitteridge died on 3 September 1993. She was survived by her husband, physiologist David Whitteridge, and three daughters. Her papers are archived at the Wellcome Collection in London.

== Works ==
- The Royal Hospital of Saint Bartholomew (1952)
- A brief history of the Hospital of Saint Bartholomew [with Veronica Stokes] (1963)
- William Harvey and the circulation of the blood (1969)
