= Sybil Trent =

American actress

- Born: Sybil Elaine Krinney; September 22, 1926; Brooklyn, New York, U.S.
- Died: June 5, 2000 (aged 73); Manhattan, New York, U.S.
- Occupation: Actress
- Known for: 19 years on Let's Pretend
- Spouse: Andrew Nieporent
- Children: 2, including Drew Nieporent

Sybil Trent (September 22, 1926 – June 5, 2000), also known professionally as Sybil Elaine and Sybil Elaine Krinney, was an American actress of stage, screen and, predominantly, radio.

== Early years ==
Trent was born Sybil Elaine Krinney on September 22, 1926, in Brooklyn, New York. She was an honor graduate of Public School 17 in the Bronx, New York City.

== Childhood career ==
In 1932 the precocious singer and celebrity impersonator made her radio bow at age six, hosting Baby Sybil Elaine and Her Kiddie Revue over station WHN in New York. That same year she appeared on Broadway (as Sybil Elaine Krinney) in the 10th edition of Earl Carroll's Vanities. She made her screen debut in one of Roscoe Arbuckle's Vitaphone shorts produced in New York.

In 1934 she enrolled in New York's School of Song, Dance, and Stagecraft, which instructor Mabel Horsey had established the previous year. Horsey staged a revue showcasing her students, and Billboard columnist Eugene Burr attended the show: "The high spot of the program was a replica of one of the broadcasts of The Stars of Tomorrow, which Miss Horsey presents Saturday mornings at 11:30 over station WEVD. Outstanding in this section -- and in the show, for that matter -- was the work of Sybil Elaine Krinney, a tiny lass who has an amazing stage presence and who sings, dances, and handles herself with the ease and ability of a veteran."

She was also featured in the New York-produced musical short Vaudeville on Parade (Universal, 1934), followed by appearances in two Hollywood features, Keep 'Em Rolling (1934) and The People's Enemy (1935), both for RKO Radio Pictures.

In 1935 she rode an elephant in the Broadway musical Jumbo (1935) at the Hippodrome Theatre. Also in 1935, she joined the cast of the children's program Let's Pretend, produced by Nila Mack. In 1938 Mack cast Sybil in a spinoff show, the juvenile quiz program The March of Games.

Vitaphone shorts producer Sam Sax, assisted by vaudeville impresario Gus Edwards, assembled a troupe of juvenile performers to appear in the musical short subject Trouble in Toyland (1935). Sybil Elaine Krinney, as she was billed, sang "I Can Sew a Button (Just Think What I Could Do for You)" and did impersonations of Greta Garbo, Mae West, Joe Penner, and other popular personalities. Film Daily singled out her specialty act, praising her as "a surefire star of the future, this kid."

== Radio ==
Changing her professional name to Sybil Trent, she settled into a steady career on network radio, appearing on dramas, serials, and children's shows. She played Countess Marla Darnell in Stella Dallas, and she had roles in Under Arrest, David Harum, Front Page Farrell, Gang Busters and The Story of Phyllis Wheatley.

Her chief contribution to radio was as a featured performer on Let's Pretend, which she joined in 1935, and she remained with the production until its final broadcast in 1954.

== Later life ==
In 1964 Trent became a talent agent, working for nine years at the Fifi Oscard agency in New York City. In 1973 she joined a major advertising agency, Young & Rubicam, where she was a casting director for the agency's television commercials. She stayed with Young & Rubicam until she retired in 1994.

== Personal life and death ==
Trent was married to multiple restaurateur Andrew Nieporent, and after she retired from business she sometimes took telephone reservations for her husband's restaurants. In 1994 columnist Ruth Reichl of the New York Times wrote, "The woman on the phone has the most delicious voice: low, slightly husky, completely inviting. Just calling for a reservation makes you eager to eat at the Montrachet." The Nieporents had two children, including restaurateur Drew Nieporent.

Sybil Trent died of lymphoma at her home in Manhattan, New York, on June 5, 2000, at age 73.
