= Khosrovidukht =

8th-century Armenian hymnographer and poet

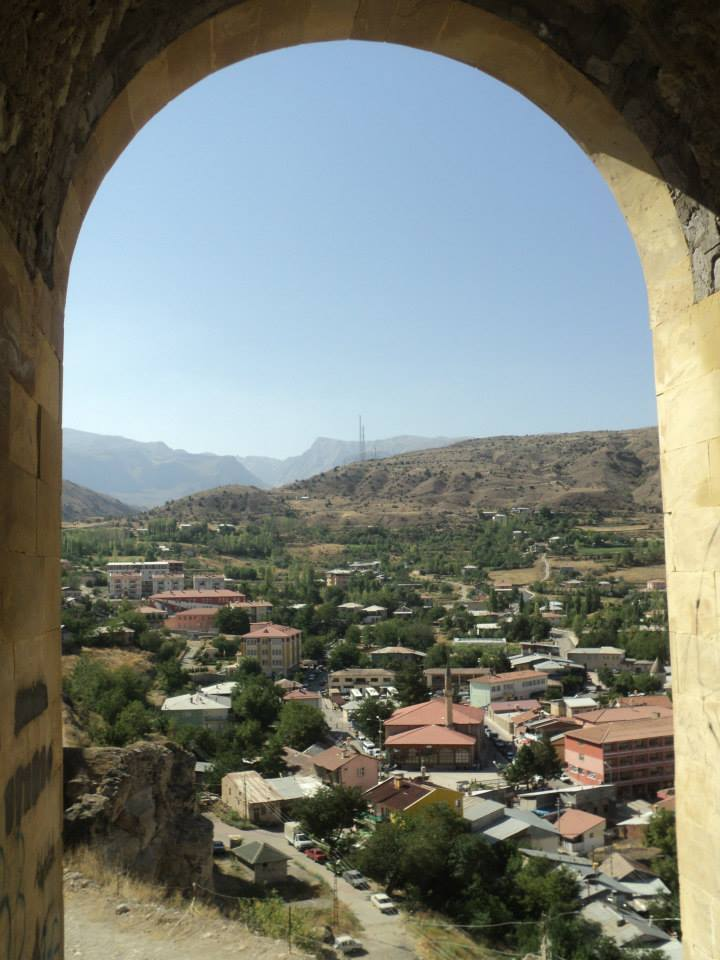
Modern-day Kemah, Turkey, where the ancient city Ani-Kamakh was in which Khosrovidukht was imprisoned

Khosrovidukht (Note: Also transliterated as Xosroviduxt. She is also known as Khosrovidukht Goghtnatsi (Khosrovidukht of Goghtn), or Khrosovidoukht Koghtnatsi.) (Armenian: Խոսրովիդուխտ, lit. 'daughter of Khosrov'; fl. early 8th century) was an Armenian hymnographer and poet who lived during the early 8th century. After her slightly earlier contemporary Sahakdukht, she is the first known woman of Armenian literature and music, and among the earliest woman composers in the history of music.

Daughter of the ruler of Goghtn, Khosrov Goghtnatsi, her father was killed and she was imprisoned in a fortress of Ani-Kamakh (modern-day Kemah) for twenty years. Her brother was imprisoned and eventually killed; Khosrovidukht's only surviving work, the sharakan (chant) "Zarmanali e indz" (More astonishing to me) was dedicated to him. Its authenticity has occasionally been doubted, with some scholars attributing it to Sahakdukht. The work did not enter the general repertory of sharakan liturgy but was eventually approved by the Armenian Church for religious use.

== Life ==
Extremely little is known about Khosrovidukht. Active in the 8th century, she is recorded as being a member of the royal family. Her father was Khosrov Goghtnatsi, who ruled Goghtn, a province of Vaspurakan. Her given name is unknown; the 'dukht' of Khosrovidukht means 'daughter of'. She is also known as Khosrovidukht Goghtnatsi (Khosrovidukht of Goghtn). (Note: Also spelled Khrosovidoukht Koghtnatsi.)

Khosrovidukht's father was killed in 706, when the local Muslim governor gathered many Armenian nobles in Nakhjavan and Goghtn and massacred them. Khosrovidukht's brother, Vahan Goghtnatsi, was then abducted by Muslim Arabs and brought to Syria, while she was taken to the fortress of Ani-Kamakh, now known as Kemah. She remained there in isolation for twenty years. Her brother converted to Islam, before gaining his freedom years later and returning to Armenia. Vahan then converted back to Christianity and the same Muslims, who considered his abjuration a crime, had him killed. (Note: Modern sources differ over the exact nature of the Vahan Goghtnatsi's death: Hacikyan (2000, p. 161) reports that he was kidnapped and taken back to Syria to be killed, while Der Hovanessian & Margossian (1978, p. 43) says he willingly went on a trip to Damascus and was killed there upon flaunting his Christian faith.) His death was in either 731 or 737. The 1978 Anthology of Armenian poetry reports that Khosrovidukht died in 737 as well, though this is not corroborated in other sources.

== Works ==
External audio
- A modern interpretation of "Zarmanali e Ints" performed by the Sharakan Early Music Ensemble
- "Zarmanali e Ints"

The work of Khosrovidukht was not known to scholars until the 19th century. After its discovery, she was recognized as the second (after her earlier contemporary Sahakdukht) woman composer and poet of Armenia. A modern recording of the piece exists, performed by the Sharakan Early Music Ensemble.

The only work attributed to Khosrovidukht is "Zarmanali e indz" (Զարմանալի է ինձ), a sharakan, or a canonical hymn. The title is variously translated as "More astonishing to me", "Wondrous it is to me", and "It is amazing to me". The piece has been described by historian Agop Jack Hacikyan as evidencing "a great deal of literary skill", and by ethnomusicologist Şahan Arzruni as "florid". Like the work of Sahakdukht, Khosrovidukht's piece was not included in the collection of official sharakans; however, despite its secular nature, "Zarmanali e indz" eventually became approved by the Armenian Church for use in services. Later sources record that the work is dedicated to her brother, following his death. Some scholars, including Ghevont Alishan, Malachia Ormanian and Grigor Hakobian attribute the work to Sahakdukht instead. See Der Hovanessian & Margossian (1978, pp. 43–44) for an English translation of the piece.

"Zarmanali e Ints" ("Զարմանալի է ինձ")

Զարմանալի է ինձ,
Քան զերգս երաժշտականաց,
Ձայնս ողբոց քոց հնչմունք,
Ո՜վ երանելի տէր Վահան, ընտրեալ յաստուծոյ։

Առաւել յորդորէ այս զհոգւոյս մասունըս,
Յօրինել քեզ երգս ո՛չ զղջականըս,
Այլ հոգևորըս, և ուրախարարըս,
Յորդորականըս, և ներբողեանըս,
Ո՜վ երանելի տէր Վահան, ծառայ Քրիստոսի։

Զարհուրեցուցանէ զքոյ ճգնութիւնդ
Զմարմնոյս բնութիւնըս.
Իսկ դու առաւել գտար.
Ո՜վ երանելի տէր Վահան, սիրող Քրիստոսի։

Արտաքնոցըն ըզգաստքըն
Ստեղծիչ բանք սնոտեացն ի պատրութիւն.
Իսկ քոյդ սիրայնոյ՝ աստուածարեալ և ոգեշահ․
Ո՜վ երանելի տէր Վահան, ընտրեալ յազատաց։

Որպէս քաջ նահատակ,
Պատրաստեալ ի պատերազմ,
Կատարեցեր զընթացըս քոյ,
Արիաբար՝ յազգացն հարաւայնոյ,
Դասաւորեալ ընդ անմարմնականսն.
Ո՜վ երանելի տէր Վահան, Գողթնեացն իշխեցող։

– Khosrovidukht (8th century)
