= Sybil Jones =

American Quaker minister

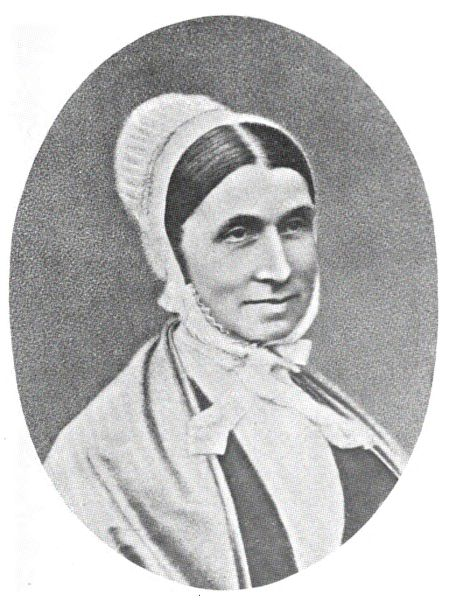
Sybil Jones.

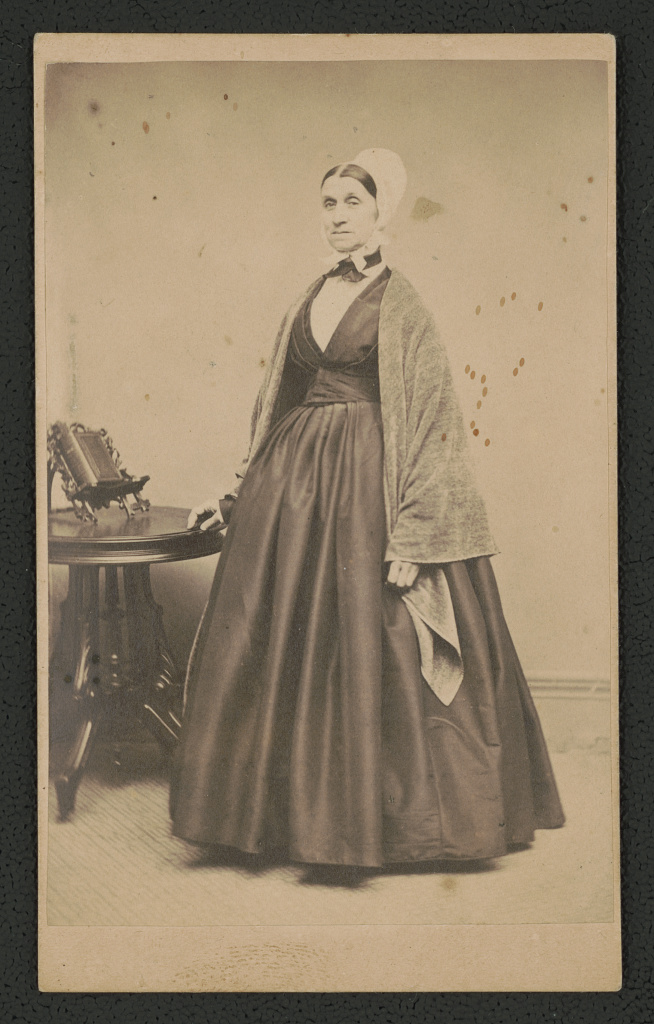
Sybil Jones, Maine, U.S.A. (c. 1860–73)

Sybil Jones (1808–1873) was an American Quaker preacher and missionary.

== Lineage ==
Sybil Jones was born in Brunswick, Maine, in 1808, the daughter of Ephraim and Susannah Jones. Her mother was a daughter of Micajah Dudley, son of Samuel Dudley, a great grandson of Samuel Dudley, of Exeter, New Hampshire, the eldest son of Governor Thomas Dudley, the Pilgrim of Plymouth, who laid claims to a lineal descent from the Earls of Leicester. Her father, Ephraim Jones, was a man of strong character, and, like all her ancestors, was prominent in the Society of Friends.

== Life ==
Her early life was passed in Augusta, Maine, where she was for a time strongly attached to the Methodist faith, but she soon passed under the influence of the Friends, and early grew to recognise the simplicity, sincerity and spirituality of their faith. In 1824–25 she was a pupil at the Friends' School in Providence, and was subsequently engaged in teaching for a period of eight years. She wrote considerably during this time, both in prose and poetry of a high order. Unfortunately but few of her manuscripts are now extant.

She was married to Eli Jones at the age of twenty-five, and they settled on a farm at South China. They attended all the meetings at the Friends' meeting-house, three miles distant from their home, and soon "their gifts were acknowledged" by the society. After residing for a few years at South China, they removed to Dirigo and settled on a farm near the Friends' meeting, where they lived until 1886.

In 1840 Sybil Jones was "liberated" by the society to do religious work in the provinces of Nova Scotia and New Brunswick; in this, as in all her trying journeys, she was accompanied by her husband. Success attended their efforts, and they met with much consideration. They prosecuted their work throughout the North, South, East and West of America, and subsequently went on an extensive religious visit to Great Britain, Ireland, various parts of the continent of Europe, including Norway and Sweden, and also went to Sierra Leone, Liberia, and some of the islands on the coast of Africa and in the West Indies. She is probably the first person who ever spoke in England publicly on total abstinence. Eli Jones always enforced the necessity for total abstinence whenever he spoke. In 1854 he was elected by the town of China to represent it in the house of the legislature, where he was given a prominent place on the committees, especially the temperance committee. Sybil Jones did much work in the hospitals and among the soldiers during the Civil War, and, besides, she addressed a large number of meetings in Washington and its vicinage, and was favorably received by many of the prominent men of the time.

In 1870 Sybil and Eli Jones were liberated to carry their faith into the Holy Land, where they were the means of starting schools and doing other good work. During all her missionary labors she had to constantly contend with feeble health, and was frequently barely able to go from one point to another to address the meetings. All this she bore with her characteristic sweetness of disposition. She was a woman of rare sweetness and strength of character, and possessed great magnetism over the audiences she addressed. Her active work in the ministry began with her first visit to the provinces, and between that time and her death she went as a herald through her own land to Liberia, to England, Ireland, Norway, Denmark, Germany, Switzerland, France, Scotland, Greece. Egypt, and the Holy Land. Few women, if any, before her had been summoned to so many widely separated places. She was well received by every nation and race. She addressed them boldly and powerfully, standing often where woman never stood before.

Shortly after her return from the East her health entirely failed her, and she died at her home on December 4, 1873.

== See also ==
- Eli and Sybil Jones House

== Sources ==
- Frost, J. William (2000). "Jones, Sybil (1808-1873), Quaker minister". American National Biography. Oxford University Press. Retrieved July 30, 2022.
- Jones, Rufus M. (1899). Eli and Sibyl Jones, Their Life and Work. Philadelphia, PA: Porter & Coates.

Attribution:
