= James Patrick Mulvaney =

American politician

Member of the U.S. House of Representatives from Missouri's 61st district

Missouri House of Representatives
- In office 1967–1975

Personal details
- Born: 1933 St. Louis, Missouri
- Died: 2012 (aged 78–79) St. Louis, Missouri
- Party: Democratic
- Spouse: Betty Neubauer
- Children: 6
- Occupation: salesman, lobbyist

James Patrick Mulvaney (October 30, 1933 - April 3, 2012) was a Democratic politician who served as an alderman for Flordell Hills in St. Louis County for 6 years and in the Missouri House of Representatives for 8 years. He was born in St. Louis, Missouri and was educated at De Andreis High School in St. Louis. Mulvaney served 3 years in the U.S. Marine Corps.
