= Eli and Sybil Jones House =

Historic house in Maine, United States

- U.S. National Register of Historic Places
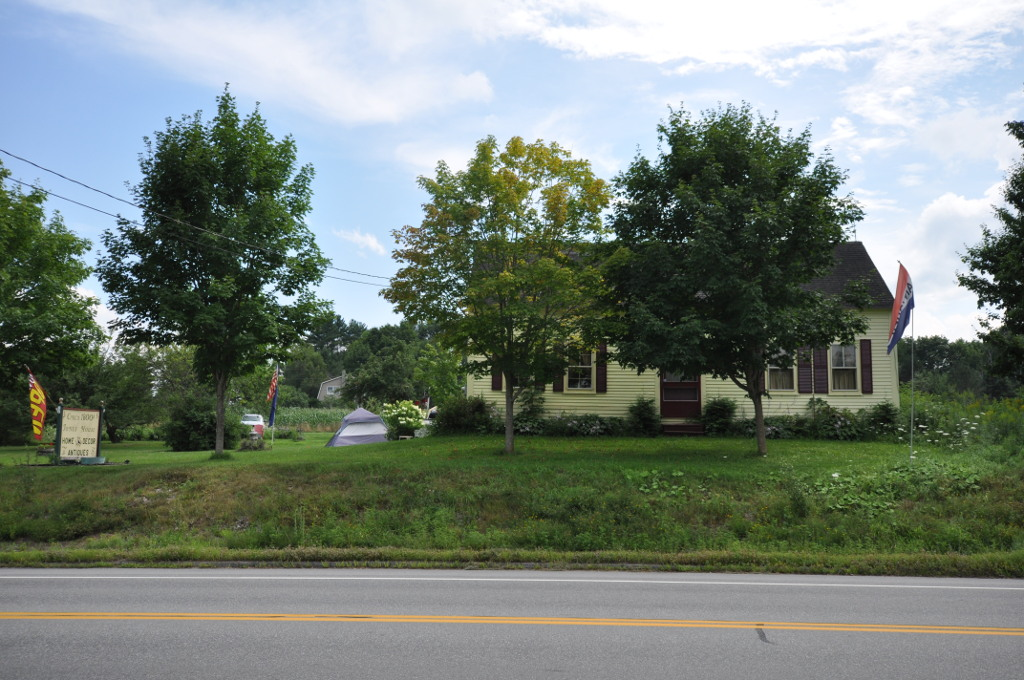

- Location within Maine Location within the United States
- Location: ME 3 at Dirigo Rd., South China, Maine
- Coordinates: 44°24′33″N 69°31′17″W
- Area: 0.5 acres (0.20 ha)
- Built: 1831
- NRHP reference No.: 84001376
- Added to NRHP: March 22, 1984

The Eli and Sybil Jones House is a historic house at Maine State Route 3 and Dirigo Road in South China, Maine. Built in 1833, this modest house was the home of Quaker missionaries Eli Jones and Sybil Jones, who gained international renown for their travels in Europe, the Middle East, and West Africa. The house was listed on the National Register of Historic Places in 1984.

== Description ==
The Eli and Sybil Jones House stands at a rural crossroads east of the village South China. It is set at the southwest corner of Maine State Route 3 and Dirigo Road. It is a 1 1/2-story wood-frame Cape style house, with a side-gable roof, clapboard siding, and a granite foundation. Its main facade, facing north toward SR 3, is five bays wide, with a simply trimmed center entrance. A similar-sized ell extends to the rear of the main block.

== History ==
Eli Jones was a member of the locally prominent Jones family, and uncle to the Quaker writer and historian Rufus Jones, who was raised in South China. Jones and his wife Sybil moved into this house, newly built, after their marriage in 1833. The couple traveled widely performing missionary work, at a time when travel could be quite difficult, visiting the places as diverse as the Middle East and the rural coast of Norway. They traveled frequently to New Brunswick and Nova Scotia, and were received by the President of Liberia. Eli Jones was also active in local affairs, serving as principal of a local Quaker preparatory school, and in the state legislature. A collection of papers relating to Eli Jones is held at Haverford College.

== See also ==
- National Register of Historic Places listings in Kennebec County, Maine
