= Anwia-Nkwanta =

- Village
- Location within Ghana
- Coordinates: 6°28′N 1°38′W
- Country: Ghana
- Region: Ashanti Region
- District: Bekwai Municipal District
- Elevation: 581 ft (177 m)
- Time zone: GMT
  - Summer (DST): GMT

Anwia-Nkwanta is a village in the Bekwai Municipal district, a district in the Ashanti Region of Ghana.
