= Sybil Cooper =

British physiologist

- Born: January 1900; London, England
- Died: 1970 aged (69–70)
- Education: Girton College, Cambridge (B.A.); University of Cambridge (Ph.D)
- Spouse: R. S. Creed
- Scientific career
- Fields: Physiology
- Workplaces: University of Cambridge; St Hilda's College, Oxford; University of Oxford

Sybil Cooper (January 1900 – 1970), was a British physiologist.

== Life and work ==
Sybil Cooper, daughter of the distinguished architect Sir Edwin Cooper, was born in London, England, in January 1900. She attended Girton College, Cambridge and took the Natural Sciences Tripos in 1922. She became a research assistant upon graduation to Edgar Adrian, studying nerve and muscle physiology, before receiving her Ph.D in 1927. Cooper then became a research student and then a research fellow at St Hilda's College, Oxford with the physiologist Charles Scott Sherrington while working as a demonstrator in anatomy for the University of Oxford. During this time, she married R. S. Creed in 1933; he was a demonstrator in physiology. She resigned her position in 1934 and had the first of her four children the following year. Able to afford household help, she took an unpaid position as a lecturer in natural science at St. Hilda's in 1940 and received a paid position as a research fellow there in 1946 that she maintained until her retirement in 1968. She was killed in an automobile accident in 1970.

She collaborated with her husband on muscle reflexes before and after the birth of her children. "Demonstrating great ability in dissecting minute sense organs with intact nerves, she recorded nerve activity. As an excellent histologist, Cooper fixed, stained, and examined the microstructure of the sense organs. Alone and with colleagues, she made advances in understanding how the muscle spindles functioned relative to their structure."
