= Josephine and Sybil Mulvany =

New Zealand weavers

Josephine Mulvany and Sybil May Mulvany were New Zealand weavers. They established the first commercial hand weaving studio in New Zealand. A large quantity of their work is held at Te Papa, in Wellington and the Auckland War Memorial Museum.

== Early life ==
Josephine Mulvany was born on 7 May 1899 and Sybil Mulvany was born on 6 March 1901. Both sisters were born in Parnell, Auckland to parents Thomas John Mulvany and Mary Reilly. In 1909 they were part of the first intake of students at Baradene College of the Sacred Heart, a Catholic boarding school. Their mother died of uterine cancer in 1912 but left money for her children to finish their education. Their father died in 1916 leaving them the family property.

After finishing school Josephine found employment at a photography studio in Auckland and Sybil trained as a nurse.

== Career ==
In 1926 the sisters left for the United Kingdom. They spent a year touring around England, Ireland, France and Italy in a new Renault open tourer. For two women to travel without a chaperone was quite significant in the 1920s. The following year they began a three-month course at the London School of Weaving. After graduating they purchased looms and other equipment required for starting a hand weaving studio and returned to New Zealand.

In 1928, they opened their first studio 'Taniko Weavers' in New Castle, Auckland. The name, Tāniko, refers to the traditional Māori method of weaving however, the weaving produced by the sisters contained no Māori influences. The next year the sisters moved their business to a larger more central location on Darby Street. The second studio had two storeys, allowing for a shop on the first level and a separate workspace of 6 looms on the second. Two more assistant weavers were employed and trained to help with demand. They were Betty Crombe, who was employed from 1929 until 1935, and Zoe Pabst, who was employed at the beginning of the 1930s for two years. Through training these two women the sisters expertise that they had gained in England was passed on to further weaving in New Zealand that had yet to encounter their more proficient techniques.

Part of the Arts and Crafts movement of the 1930s the business was designed to showcase the value of handcrafts and their authenticity. A small loom was placed in the store window to be used by the shop keeper and attract customers. The studio produced fashion goods, household linen and religious items. Both sisters taught weaving at the studio on the loom in their front window and published a series of articles on weaving in local newspapers. Among their pupils was Florence Atkins who went on to begin the first weaving class in New Zealand at the Canterbury University College School of Art.

In 1932, an Auckland branch was established. However, this closed after 18 months. This set back led to the Wellington studio moving to smaller premises. This move saw the studio name change to 'Taniko Loom-Craft Weavers' in order to distinguish the business from producers of machine knitting. In July 1935, Sybil married Selwyn Wright and sold her interest in the business to her sister. The business continued for another year until Josephine married William Glasgow in July 1936.

Both Josephine and Sybil continued to weave professionally and exhibit their work, but they never opened another business.

Josephine died on 6 October 1967 in Christchurch, New Zealand.

Sybil died on 28 March 1983 in Whangārei, New Zealand.

== Legacy ==
Although commercially successful the sisters did not inspire a widespread practice of European weaving during their business operation. However, the knowledge and teachings they brought to New Zealand from England were key in developing the weaving skills of women who would go on to have a wider impact on the practice of weaving in New Zealand. Zoe Pabst was heavily involved in the establishment of weavers guilds following the second world war. Florence Aitkins, used the teachings of the Mulvany sisters to form the weaving curriculum at the University of Canterbury and passed on that knowledge to hundreds of students.

== Awards and recognition ==
1933, Kohn medal, 'Best Exhibit in the Craft and Applied Art Category' Spring Exhibition of the Auckland Society of Arts

1999, Auckland Museum exhibition 'The Mulvany Sisters: WeaReng and Other Adventures'
