= Takoradi (Ghana parliament constituency) =

Constituency in Ghana

Sekondi
- constituency for the Parliament of Ghana
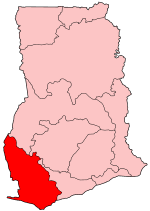
- District: Shama Ahanta East Metropolitan District
- Region: Western Region of Ghana

Current constituency
- Party: New Patriotic Party
- MP: Kwabena Okyere Darko-Mensah

Takoradi is one of the constituencies represented in the Parliament of Ghana. It elects one Member of Parliament (MP) by the first past the post system of election. Kwabena Okyere Darko-Mensah is the member of parliament for the constituency. He was elected on the ticket of the New Patriotic Party (NPP) won a majority of 11,043 votes to become the MP. The former MP for the constituency was Hon. Madam Gladys Asma. Who retired from active politics before the 2008 parliamentary elections.

== See also ==
- List of Ghana Parliament constituencies
