= Zabel Sibil Asadour =

Ottoman Armenian poet, writer and publisher

Zabel Asadour
- Born: Zabel Khanjian; 23 July 1863; Üsküdar, Constantinople, Ottoman Empire
- Died: 19 June 1934 (aged 70); Istanbul, Turkey
- Occupations: Novelist, poet, writer, publisher, and philanthropist.
- Writing career
- Pen name: Sibil

Zabel Asadour (Armenian: Զապէլ Ասատուր; born Zabel Khanjian, Armenian: Զապէլ Խանճեան; July 23, 1863 – June 19, 1934), better known by her literary pseudonym Sibil (Armenian: Սիպիլ), was an Ottoman Armenian poet, writer, publisher, educator and philanthropist.

== Biography ==
She was born and educated at the Üsküdar Jemaran Lyceum in Constantinople where she graduated in 1879. She was one of the founders of the Society of Nation-Dedicated Armenian Women (Ազգանուէր հայուհեաց ընկերութիւն), an organization that supported the construction, maintenance, and operation of Armenian girl schools throughout the Armenian populated districts of the Ottoman Empire. She taught in the provinces and then in Constantinople.

In 1879, she wrote the textbook Practical Grammar for Contemporary Modern Armenian (Գործնական քերականութիւն արդի աշխարհաբարի), a classical grammar book that has been revised and republished many times with help of her husband Hrant Asadour. Sibil also wrote general articles about education and pedagogy, as well as poems for children.

Writer and political figure Krikor Zohrab, Hrant Asadour, together with Sibil collectively re-established the literary publication Massis, where Sibil wrote portraits of many renowned Western Armenian literary figures. The articles were collected in 1921 in a joint book which Hrant Asadour entitled Profiles (Դիմաստուերներ).

Sibil was best known for her literary works. In the 1880s she published her poems in Massis and Hairenik. In 1891, she published her novel The Heart of a Girl (Աղջկան մը սիրտը) and a collection of poems, Reflections (Ցոլքեր), in 1902, mostly romantic and patriotic poems. She also wrote short stories, particularly about women. She also wrote for theater and one of her most famous works is the play The Bride (Հարսը). In 1901, she married writer, journalist, and intellectual Hrant Asadour. She and Hrant Asadour exchanged numerous love letters over the course of their courtship, a handful of which have been translated into English by Jennifer Manoukian.
