= Russian legislative elections =

Elections that determine the composition of the Russian lower house

Russian legislative elections refer to Russian elections that determine the composition of the State Duma, the lower house of the Federal Assembly. The State Duma convenes for a maximum term of five years before elections must be called, and all 450 deputies are elected concurrently via universal suffrage.

As of 2026, elections have been held nine times:

- 1st State Duma: 12 December 1993
- 2nd State Duma: 17 December 1995
- 3rd State Duma: 19 December 1999
- 4th State Duma: 7 December 2003
- 5th State Duma: 2 December 2007
- 6th State Duma: 4 December 2011
- 7th State Duma: 18 September 2016
- 8th State Duma: 17-19 September 2021
- 9th State Duma: 18-20 September 2026

According to current Russian electoral law, 225 of the 450 seats in the State Duma are elected via Party-list proportional representation with a 5% electoral threshold. The remaining 225 seats are elected via single member constituencies. The elections of 1993–2003 and 2016–2021 were held according to this scheme.

In 2007 and 2011, the threshold was 7% and all 450 members of the Duma were elected by party lists.

== Procedure ==
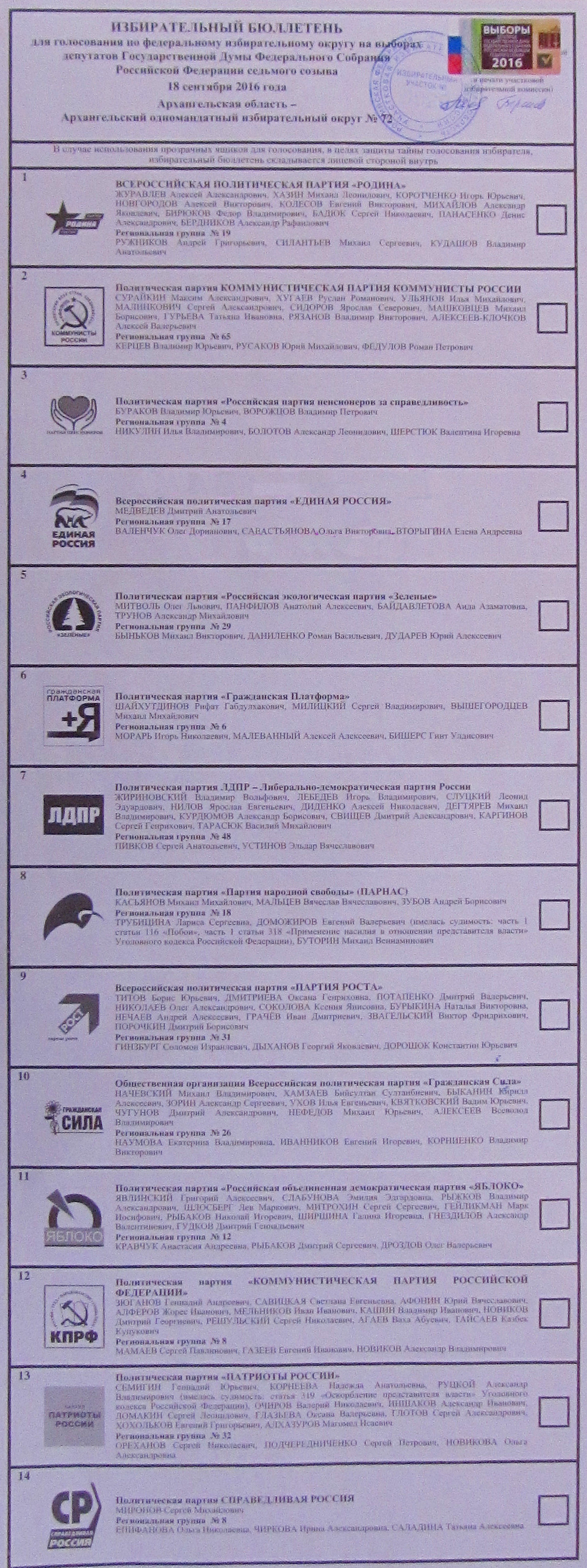
Ballot paper in the State Duma of Russia, 2016

The layout and number of single-mandate districts are established in federal law by the State Duma in agreement with the Central Election Commission. The district's boundaries may not coincide with the boundaries of the constituent entities of the Russian Federation, but at the same time, each subject must have at least one district. To register a candidate in a single-mandate constituency, it is necessary to overcome the 3% threshold of signatures from the number of voters in the respective constituency. The candidate with the most votes wins.

The federal list of candidates must contain between 200 and 400 candidates from a party (with a proportional system, the vote is cast for the list, not for an individual candidate). To pass the list for elections, it is necessary to collect more than 200,000 signatures, but not less than 7,000 in one subject of the Russian Federation. The following do not require signatures: lists that overcame the 3% threshold for the federal district in the previous elections; and the list of candidates nominated by a political party that was admitted to the distribution of deputy mandates in the legislative body of at least one subject of the Russian Federation. Parties that do not pass the 5% threshold on the lists are not allowed to distribute deputy mandates.

== Results ==
=== 1st State Duma (1994—1996) ===
- Liberal Democratic Party of Russia — 64;
- Russia's Choice (Political Movement "Russia's Choice", Movement "Democratic Russia", Democratic Initiative Party, Peasant Party of Russia) — 64;
- Communist Party of the Russian Federation — 42;
- Women of Russia (Union of Women of Russia, Association of Women Entrepreneurs of Russia, Union of Women of the Navy) — 23;
- Agrarian Party of Russia — 37;
- Yavlinsky-Boldyrev-Lukin (Russian Christian Democratic Union - New Democracy, Social Democratic Party of the Russian Federation, Republican Party of the Russian Federation) — 20;
- Party of Russian Unity and Accord — 22;
- Democratic Party of Russia — 14;
- Civic Union (Russian Union of Industrialists and Entrepreneurs, All-Russian Union of Renewal, Russian Social Democratic Centre, Association of Industrialists and Entrepreneurs of Russia, Trade Union of Forestry Workers of the RSFSR, Trade Union of Construction Workers and Building Materials Industry of the RSFSR, Movement "War Veterans for Peace") — 10;
- Russian Democratic Reform Movement — 5;
- Dignity and Mercy — 3;
- Future of Russia–New Names (Youth movement in support of the People's Party Free Russia - Political Movement "Young Social Democrats of Russia", Political and Economic Association "Civil Union") — 2;
- Constructive-ecological movement of Russia "Kedr" — 1;
- Independent — 130;

=== 2nd State Duma (1996—2000) ===
- Communist Party of the Russian Federation (CPRF, Spiritual Legacy) — 157;
- Liberal Democratic Party of Russia — 52;
- Our Home – Russia — 55;
- Yabloko (Yabloko, Democratic Alternative) — 41;
- Agrarian Party of Russia — 20;
- Power to the People (Russian All-People's Union, Mothers' Movement for Social Justice) — 9;
- Democratic Choice of Russia – United Democrats (Democratic Choice of Russia – United Democrats, Peasant Party of Russia, Russian Party of Social Democracy, Congress of National Associations of Russia) — 9;
- Congress of Russian Communities — 5;
- Ivan Rybkin Bloc (Regions of Russia, Union of Realists) — 3;
- Forward, Russia — 3;
- Women of Russia — 2;
- Pamfilova-Gurov-Lysenko (Republican Party of the Russian Federation) — 2;
- Stanislav Govorukhin Bloc (Andrei Golovin's People's Alliance, Russian Christian Democratic Movement) — 1;
- Bloc 89 — 1;
- Communists — Labour Russia — For the USSR — 1;
- My Fatherland — 1;
- Common Cause — 1;
- Party of Russian Unity and Accord — 1;
- Party of Workers' Self-Government — 1;
- Party of Economic Freedom — 1;
- Transformation of the Fatherland — 1;
- Trade Unions — Industrialists of Russia — Union of Labour — 1;
- Independent — 77;

=== 3rd State Duma (2000—2003) ===
- Communist Party of the Russian Federation — 113;
- Unity (National Patriotic Party of Russia, Frontier Generation, Union of Afghanistan Veterans, Russian Christian Democratic Party, Refah, My Family, Movement in Support of Voters) — 64;
- Fatherland – All Russia (Fatherland, Regions of Russia, For Equality and Justice, Union of Russian Christian Democrats, Agrarian Party of Russia) — 75;
- Union of Right Forces (New Force, Russia Young, Peasant Party of Russia) — 29;
- Zhirinovsky Bloc — 17;
- Yabloko — 20;
- Our Home – Russia — 7;
- Russian All-People's Union — 2;
- Movement in Support of the Army — 2;
- Spiritual Legacy — 1;
- Andrei Nikolayev and Svyatoslav Fyodorov Bloc (Party of Workers' Self-Government, Workers' Socialist Party, Realists) — 1;
- Congress of Russian Communities — Yury Boldyrev Movement — 1;
- Pensioners' Party — 1;
- Russian Socialist Party — 1;
- Independent — 107;

=== 4th State Duma (2003—2007) ===
- United Russia — 308;
- Communist Party of the Russian Federation — 46;
- Liberal Democratic Party of Russia — 35;
- Rodina (Party of Russian Regions, People's Will, Socialist United Party of Russia) — 29;
- People's Party of the Russian Federation — 17;
- Yabloko — 4;
- Union of Right Forces — 3;
- Agrarian Party of Russia — 3;
- Russian Party of Pensioners and Social Justice Party — 1;
- Independent — 67;

=== 5th State Duma (2007—2011) ===
- United Russia — 315;
- Communist Party of the Russian Federation — 57;
- Liberal Democratic Party of Russia — 40;
- A Just Russia — 38;

=== 6th State Duma (2011—2016) ===
- United Russia — 238;
- Communist Party of the Russian Federation — 92;
- A Just Russia — 64;
- Liberal Democratic Party of Russia — 56;

=== 7th State Duma (2016—2021) ===
- United Russia — 344;
- Communist Party of the Russian Federation — 42;
- Liberal Democratic Party of Russia — 39;
- A Just Russia — 23;
- Rodina — 1;
- Civic Platform — 1;

=== 8th State Duma ===
- United Russia — 324;
- Communist Party of the Russian Federation — 58;
- A Just Russia – For Truth — 28;
- Liberal Democratic Party of Russia — 21;
- New People — 15;
- Rodina — 1;
- Civic Platform — 1;
- Party of Growth — 1;
- Independent — 1;

== Next legislative election ==
- 2031 Russian legislative election

== See also ==
- Elections in Russia
