= All-Russian Sociopolitical Movement of Women of Russia =

Russian feminist political group

- Ideology: Feminism

The All-Russian Sociopolitical Movement of Women of Russia (MWR) was a Russian feminist civic and political organisation founded by Ekaterina Lakhova in November 1996.

A split from the Women of Russia voting bloc, MWR was a more far-reaching reformist movement than the Women's Union of Russia, aiming for a complete democratic reform of Russia and the creation of a civil society. They took their lead to increase women's voices and rights from the World Conference on Women, 1995.
