= Pukhov =

Pukhov (Russian: Пухов, from пух meaning feather) is a Russian masculine surname, its feminine counterpart is Pukhova. It may refer to:

- Ilya Pukhov (born 1992), Belarusian football player
- Nikolai Pukhov (1895–1958), Soviet military commander
- Pavel Pukhov (1983–2013), Russian street artist
- Roman Pukhov (born 2000), Russian football player
- Rufina Pukhova (1932–2021), Russian memoir writer
- Ruslan Pukhov (born 1973), Russian defense analyst
- Stanislav Pukhov (born 1977), Russian badminton player
- Timur Pukhov (born 1998), Russian football player
- Zoya Pukhova (1936–2016), Soviet politician
