= Antifascist Committee of Soviet Women =

Antifascist Committee of Soviet Women (AKSZh) (Russian: Антифашистский комитет советских женщин) also known as the Committee of Soviet Women (Комитет советских женщин), was a state women's organization in Soviet Russia, founded in 1941. It was renamed to Committee of Soviet Women in 1956.

It was a state organization and a branch of the Communist Party of the Soviet Union.

In 1930, the Zhenotdel had been dissolved because women's issues were officially regarded to have been solved in Soviet Russia. In 1941, however, the Antifascist Committee of Soviet Women was founded to promote the Soviet women's model internationally, specifically the Soviet woman's capacity to successfully combine the role of mother, worker and citizen: on a congress in Paris in 1945, it took the initiative to found the Women's International Democratic Federation for the same purpose.

It was dissolved in 1992 and succeeded by the Union of Women of Russia.

== Chairwomen ==
- Valentina Grizodubova (1941–1945)
- Nina Popova (1945–1968)
- Valentina Tereshkova (1968–1987)
- Zoya Pukhova (1987–1991)
- Alevtina Fedulova (1991–1992)
