= Renita Grigoryeva =

Russian film director (1931–2021)

- Born: 13 July 1931; Moscow, USSR
- Died: 19 January 2021 (aged 89)
- Occupations: Director; actress; writer; screenwriter
- Awards: USSR State Prize (1983)

Renita Andreevna Grigorieva (Russian: Рени́та Андре́евна Григо́рьева; 13 July 1931 – 19 January 2021) was a Russian director, actress, writer, and screenwriter of both documentary and feature films. She was a 1983 laureate of the USSR State Prize.

== Biography ==
She was born in Moscow to Andrei Semyonovich Shamshin (1903–1972), a scientist-agronomist, and Nina Vasilievna Popova (1908–1994), a Soviet party and social activist.
