= VOKS =

USSR cultural organization

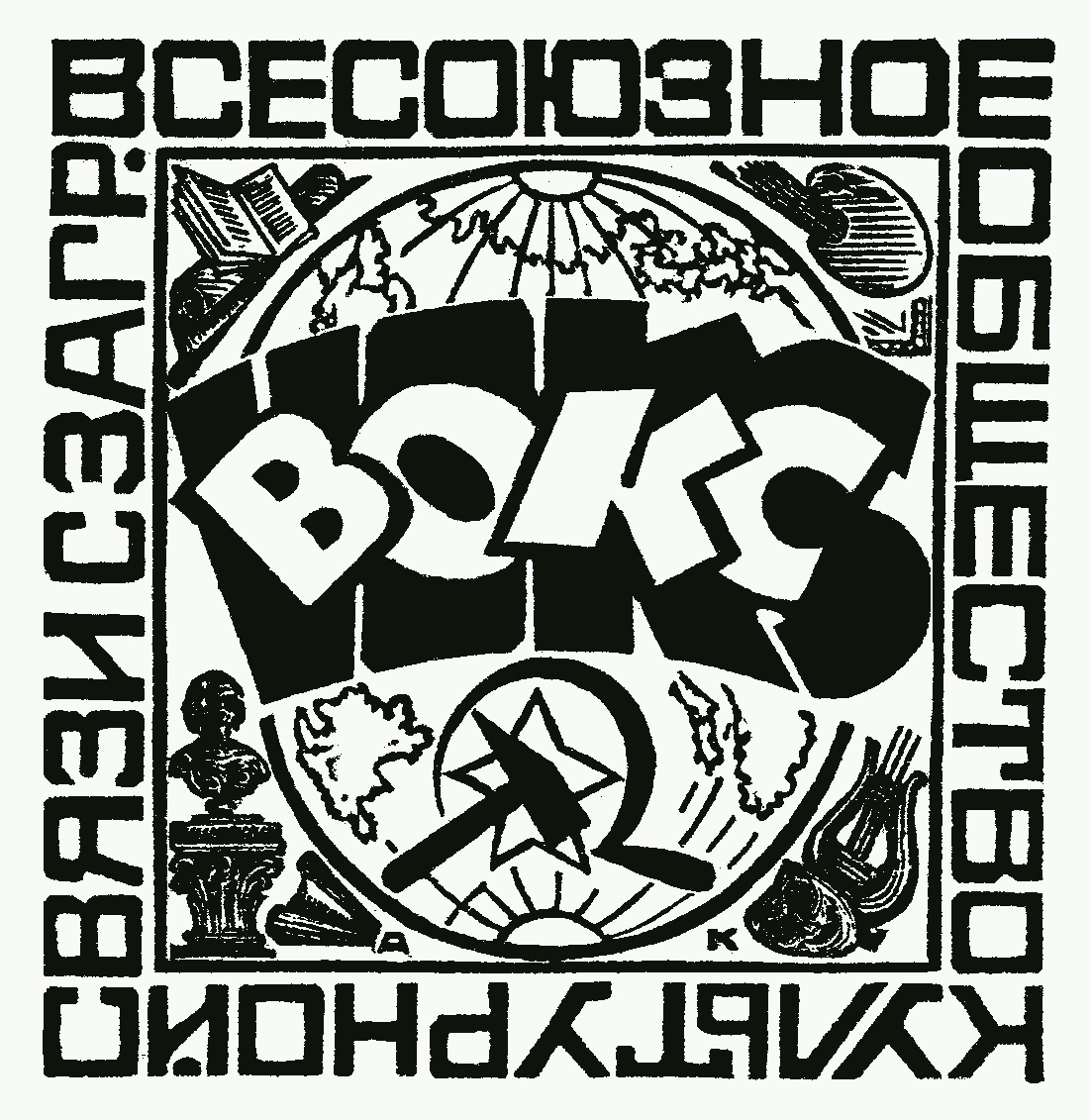
Logo of the All-Union Society for Cultural Relations with Foreign Countries, prominently featuring the acronym VOKS in both Cyrillic and Latin characters.

VOKS (an acronym for the Russian Vsesoiuznoe Obshchestvo Kul'turnoi Sviazi s zagranitsei — Всесоюзное общество культурной связи с заграницей, All-Union Society for Cultural Relations with Foreign Countries), or the Society of Cultural Relations with the Soviet Union, was an entity created by the government of the Soviet Union (USSR) in 1925 to promote international cultural contact between writers, composers, musicians, cinematographers, artists, scientists, educators, and athletes of the USSR with those of other countries. The organization conducted tours and conferences of such cultural workers.

Although of Soviet origin, VOKS was in fact an international organization, with parallel national branches around the world, such as the American Society for Cultural Relations with Russia (established 1926) and the Society for Polish-Soviet Friendship (established 1944). VOKS was frequently criticized by Western government officials, public intellectuals, and the press for functioning as a de facto communist propaganda organization. VOKS was restructured and renamed in 1958, replaced by a new friendship organization known as the Union of Soviet Societies for Friendship and Cultural Relations with Foreign Countries, which continued to exist until 1992.

== Organizational history ==
=== Establishment and structure ===
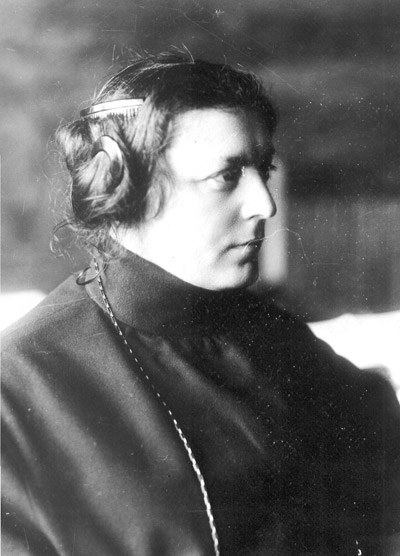
Olga Davidovna Kameneva, sister of Leon Trotsky, was the first chief of VOKS, holding the post of chair (predsedatel) from 1925 until 1930.

VOKS, the All-Union Society for Cultural Relations with Foreign Countries, was established in Moscow in 1925 as a mechanism to coordinate cultural contact between Soviet cultural workers and intellectuals and their peers in the capitalist countries of the West. Planning for the organization seems to have begun in May 1925, with a formal constitution for the society approved by a decree of the Council of People's Commissars dated 8 August. According to this formal public document, VOKS was intended "to cooperate in the establishment and development of scientific and cultural relations between institutions, public organizations and individual scientific and cultural workers in the USSR and those of other countries."

VOKS was subdivided by field of interest into a number of sections, including a Literary Section concentrating upon publishers and authors; a Musical and Theatrical Section for composers, musicians, actors, and playwrights; a Cinema Section for cinematographers and those concerned with film production; a Juridical Section dealing with matters of interest to jurists; and an Exhibition Section to deal with the presentation of international expositions relating to art and literature. VOKS also maintained a Press Department, which published an organ called the Weekly News Bulletin in Russian, English, French, and German.

=== Official function ===
The organization had both international and domestic functions, managing the activities of a growing number of "societies of friends of the Soviet Union" around the world as well as gathering information about cultural trends in the West and sponsoring direct contract between Soviet and non-Soviet cultural workers and intellectuals.

From its earliest days VOKS coordinated cultural, scientific, and literary exchanges and was the organization which frequently received prominent visitors to the Soviet Union from the West and arranged their contacts with Soviet peers. Inside the USSR, the organization facilitated the importation and translation of foreign scientific and literary texts and organized public presentations by artists and scholars returning from trips to the West. The society also helped with currency transfers to enable Soviet scholars to join foreign academic societies, expedited the acquisition of travel visas, and assisted with the difficult process of receiving foreign books and journals through the USSR's tight net of internal censorship.

Although officially launched by the Council of People's Commissars and maintaining close connections with both the People's Commissariat of Foreign Affairs and the secret police, VOKS consistently maintained the pretext of being an independent "society" rather than an official appendage of the Soviet state apparatus. This semi-independent status was accentuated by the inclusion of significant numbers of non-Party intellectuals within its membership ranks.

=== Propaganda function ===
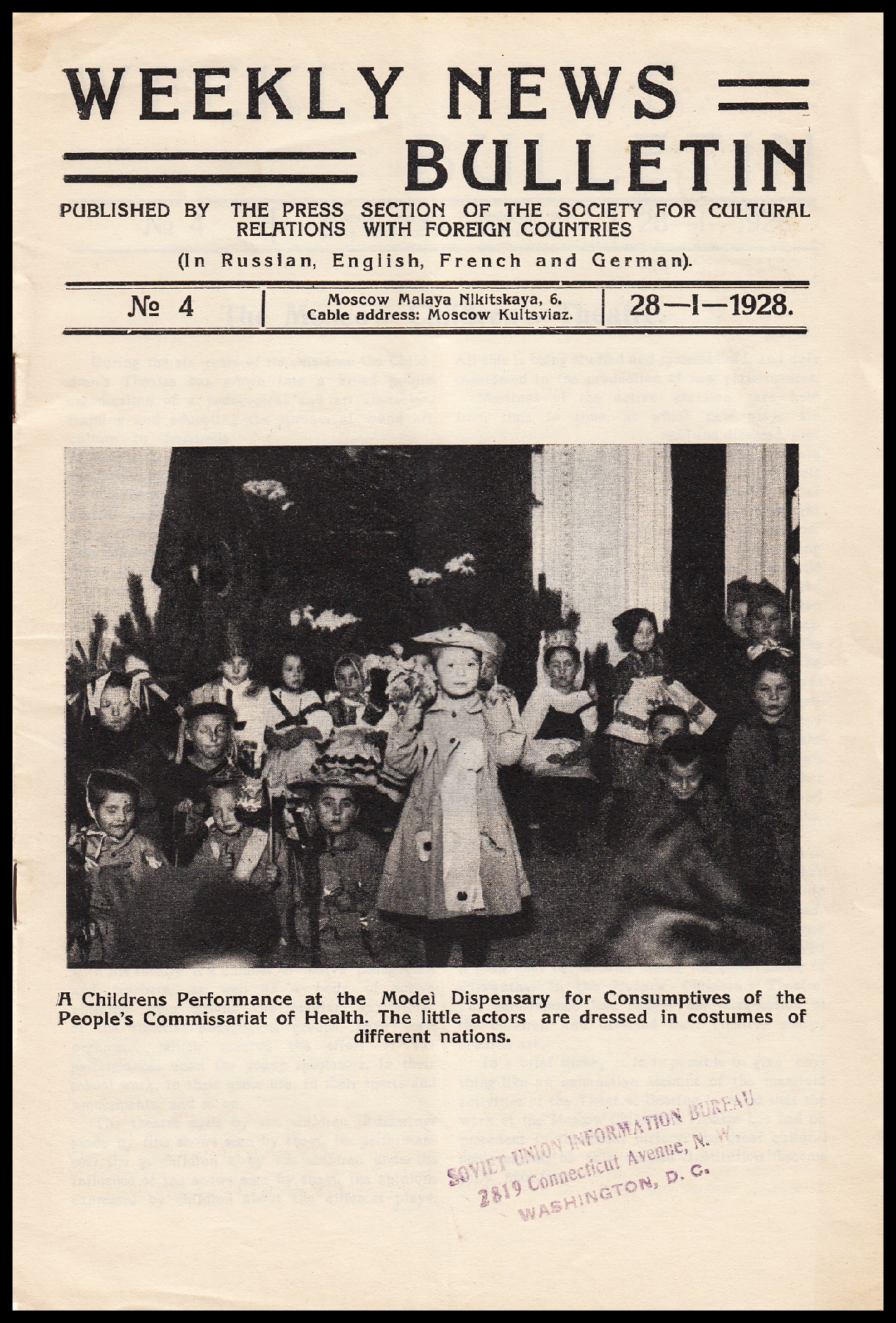
As part of its propaganda efforts, VOKS published a Weekly News Bulletin in Russian, English, German, and French which featured stories about the positive achievements of Soviet medicine, literature, art, and science.

A key aspect of VOKS was its ability to put forward articulate intellectuals to defend the Russian revolution and the Soviet system in an international setting. VOKS-sponsored scientists, artists, and educators reached the general public through lectures, exhibitions, and other forms of public interaction, and were also instrumental in maintaining Moscow's influence over the network of so-called "friendship societies" across Europe and around the world, putting a learned and cultured face on a sometimes brutal revolutionary reality.

VOKS sponsored artistic exhibitions, cultural exchanges, concerts, tours, lectures, and sporting events which helped to cast the USSR in a positive and humane light. The society also published travel guides in English, German, and French and made efforts to solve problems and expedite contacts for foreigners traveling in the Soviet Union. The successes and prestige of VOKS abroad seem to have additionally had a positive impact on shaping the attitudes of the Soviet intelligentsia during the 1920s, building support among the sometimes feisty artistic community for the new regime.

The organization also served as an effective front for the Soviet Union's foreign intelligence operations, as historian Svetlana Chervonnaya notes:

However, VOKS also often served as a convenient 'roof' for operations of both branches of Soviet intelligence, whose residents and operatives used opportunities provided by VOKS to establish and maintain contacts in intellectual, scientific and government circles. These contacts were, for the most part, unaware that they were dealing not with 'cultural representatives' and diplomats, but with intelligence officers.

=== Leadership ===
The leading figure in VOKS from the time of its establishment until 1930 was Olga Kameneva, the sister of prominent Bolshevik Leon Trotsky and wife of Soviet leader Lev Kamenev. Kameneva was followed in 1930 by Fedor Nikolaevich Petrov, a college educated Old Bolshevik scientist who had worked previously in the Soviet bureaucracy as the head of the Main Directorate for Scientific, Artistic, Museum, Theatrical, and Literary Institutions and Organizations (Glavnauka), under the People's Commissariat for Education.

In 1934 Petrov was replaced as head of VOKS by Alekander Arosev, a writer and former Ambassador to Czechoslovakia who was a longtime acquaintance of Joseph Stalin's right-hand man, V.M. Molotov. Arosev would run afoul of the secret police in 1937 during the Terror of 1937-38. He was replaced by Viktor Fedorovich Smirnov, who remained as head of VOKS until 1940.

Viktor Smirnov would be followed by just three other chairs of VOKS and its successor organization during the 1940s, 1950s, and 1960s, and the first half of the 1970s — Vladimir Kemenov (1940 to 1948), Andrei Denisov (1948 to 1957), and Nina Popova (1957 to 1975).

=== VOKS in the 1950s ===
By 1957 so-called "friendship societies" had been established in 47 countries, all of which were coordinated by VOKS.

In America, VOKS gained new notoriety in the 1950s when U.S. Senator Joseph McCarthy accused journalist Edward R. Murrow of colluding with the organization on the CBS television program See It Now.

=== From VOKS to SSOD ===
In 1958, VOKS was reorganized as a new entity called the Union of Soviet Societies for Friendship and Cultural Contacts (SSOD). The new SSOD continued to fulfill the role previously played by VOKS until it was disbanded in 1992, in the aftermath of the dissolution of the Soviet Union in December of the previous year.

An official government agency for international cultural affairs followed in the post-communist period, called since 1994 the "Russian Center for International Scientific and Cultural Cooperation of the Government of the Russian Federation."

== Overseas counterparts ==
=== Society for Cultural Relations (UK) ===
Known as the SCR, the Society for Cultural Relations between the Peoples of the British Commonwealth and the Union of Socialist Soviet Republics was founded in London in 1924 by leading intellectuals of the time. It may have served as a prompt for the USSR to found VOKS in response to their initiative.

OBJECTS OF THE S.C.R. 1. To collect and diffuse information in both countries on developments in Science, Education, Philosophy, Art, Literature, and Social and Economic Life. 2. To organise lectures and an interchange of lecturers, conferences, exhibitions, etc., and to arrange for the publication and translation of papers and books. 3. To provide opportunities for social intercourse. 4. To take any action deemed desirable to forward the intellectual and technical progress of both peoples.

The initial officers were: PRESIDENT: Prof. L. T. Hobhouse, Litt.D., LL.D.

VICE-PRESIDENTS: Prof. Lascelles Abercrombie, E. M. Forster, David Garnett, Julian Huxley, Prof. A. A. Ivanov, J. M. Keynes, Prof. A. N. Kriloff, Dr. V. P. Lebedeff, Dr. Albert Mansbridge, N. M. Minsky, Prof. M. N. Pokrovsky, Prof. W. A. Stekloff, H. G. Wells, Mrs. Virginia Woolf, Prof. O. J. Schmidt

EXECUTIVE COMMITTEE: Chairman: Miss Llewelyn Davies. Vice-Chairman: Miss A. Ruth Fry. Hon. Treasurer: Henry J. May. Hon. Secretary: Mrs. Catherine Rabinovich. Members: Ashley Dukes, L. F. Gueruss, Dr. V. N. Polovtsev, A. F. Rothstein, Mme. Z. Vengerova, Leonard S. Woolf.

The Society is still in existence, although political changes have caused a change of name to: Society for Co-operation in Russian and Soviet Studies (SCRSS). It has its own building, and houses several specialized libraries, archives and picture collections. It organizes regular lectures and Russia-themed events. The website is: http://www.scrss.org.uk/index.htm

=== American Society for Cultural Relations with Russia ===
The American Society for Cultural Relations with Russia was established 1926 and organized in 1927, with offices at 49 East 25th Street, New York, NY.

In the exchange of books on cultural and technical subjects with learned societies, universities and Government departments in foreign countries has reached considerable proportions, the USA sent more than 48,000 volumes, representing some 60 percent of the exchange.

As of 1928, members included:

- Officers:
  - President: William Allan Neilson
  - Vice Presidents: John Dewey, Stephen P. Duggan, Floyd Dell, Leopold Stokowski, Lillian D. Wald
  - Treasurer: Allen Wardwell
  - Secretary: Lucy Branham
- Board:
  - Chairman of the Executive Committee: Graham R. Taylor
  - Members: Thomas L. Cotton, Jerome Davis, Ernestine Evans, Mrs. Norman Hapgood, Arthur Garfield Hays, Horace Liveright, Underhill Moore, Ernest M. Patterson, James N. Rosenbeg, Lee Simonson, Edgard Varese, above-mentioned officers
- Executive Committee: Thomas L. Cotton, Stephen P. Duggan, Ernestine Evans, Mrs. Norman Hapgood, Lee Simonson, Graham R. Taylor, Lillian D. Wald, Allen Wardwell
- Advisory Council: Jane Addams, Carl Alsberg, Franz Boas, Phillips Bradley, Stuart Chase, Haven Emerson, Zona Gale, Frank Goler, Mrs. J. Borden Harrison, David Starr Jordan, Alexander Kaun, Susan Kingsbury, Julia Lathrop, William Allen White, Eva Le Gallienne, Howard Scott Liddell, E. C. Lindeman, Robert Littell, H. Adolphus Miller, Boardman Robinson, Clarence C. Stein, Lucy Textor, Wilbur K. Thomas, Harry Ward, Lucy Wilson

=== Polish–Soviet Friendship Society ===
The Society for Polish-Soviet Friendship (in Polish, Towarzystwo Przyjaźni Polsko-Radzieckiej or TPPR) was established 1944.

== Legacy ==
The papers of VOKS are housed in Moscow at the State Archive of the Russian Federation (GARF).

== See also ==
- Intourist
- Vladimir Kemenov
