= Nina Popova (official) =

Soviet civil servant (1908–1994)

- Нина Васильевна Попова
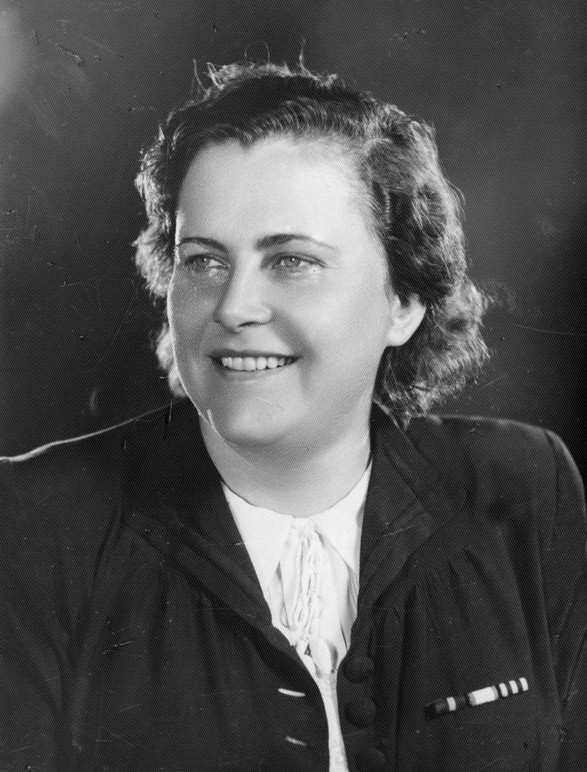
- Popova and her daughter Renita Grigoryeva observing the linotype machines at the Detroit Free Press, 1960
- Born: Nina Vasilyevna Popova; 22 January 1908; Yelets, Oryol Governorate, Russian Empire
- Died: 30 May 1994 (aged 86); Moscow, Russia
- Occupations: Civil servant, women's rights activist
- Years active: 1924–1977

Nina Vasilyevna Popova (Russian: Нина Васильевна Попова; 22 January 1908 – 30 May 1994) was a Soviet civil servant and women's rights activist. Orphaned at the age of twelve, she lived for two years in an orphanage before being reunited with her brother. She did not complete her secondary education because she needed to work. After training youth for the pioneer movement, she moved to Tambov, where she attended the Soviet Party School, after which she taught trade union officials and worked in the regional museum. She was sent to Leningrad to continue her education in 1930, but left after one year to join her husband who was studying in Moscow. After completing studies at the Moscow Institute of Philosophy, Literature, and History in 1934, she became a vice rector at the Moscow Marxist–Leninist University for Science, Technology, and Engineering Workers.

In 1937, Popova began working as a secretary for the Communist Party. She worked for the Committee of the Krasnopresnensky District, the most important in Moscow. She was appointed chair of the district in 1941 and during World War II was responsible for maintaining district functions and security. Her efficiency in preparing the district for war resulted in her being honored in 1941 with both the Order of the Badge of Honor and Order of the Red Star. Also in 1941, she was one of the founders of the Antifascist Committee of Soviet Women (AKSZh), serving as its chair from 1945 to 1968. Popova was also a founding member of the Women's International Democratic Federation (WIDF) and served as a vice president of the organization from 1945 to 1967. From 1945 to 1957, she was secretary of the All-Union Central Council of Trade Unions. Elected as a deputy of the Supreme Soviet of the Soviet Union in 1950, she served consecutive terms from the third to ninth sessions.

Popova was chair from 1957 to 1976 of the executive council of the All-Union Society for Cultural Relations with Foreign Countries (VOKS), and a full member of the Central Committee of the Communist Party from 1961 to 1976. She was known for supporting policies and actions which improved international relations and for her skill in utilizing her networks and party positions to press for legislation to improve the status of women. In recognition of her work, she was honored with the Lenin Peace Prize for Strengthening Peace among Nations in 1953, received the Order of Lenin and the Order of the Red Banner of Labour twice, and was recognized with the Order of the October Revolution. Gender studies scholar Alexandra Talavar stated that Popova's role in the fight for women's agency in the era between Stalin and Brezhnev was pivotal. She also believed that study of Popova's life confirmed that women's advances in the period resulted from the significant efforts of women activists.

== Early life and education ==
Nina Vasilyevna Popova was born on 22 January 1908 in Novokhopyorsk, Russian Empire. (Note: Official documents show the birth was recorded in Novokhopyorsk, now in the Voronezh Oblast, on 9 (22) January 1908), but according to writer Natalia Borisova, Popova stated this was an error and that she was born in Yelets. Alexandra (Sasha) Talavar, a gender studies scholar at Central European University, stated that it is "impossible currently to establish which version is correct", as official files submitted to the Central Committee show Novokhopyorsk, but her daughter recalled the birth occurred in Yelets and it may be that Popova had reasons to obscure her origins. Popova was born on 9 January 1908 O.S., before the Russians changed from the Julian calendar to the Gregorian calendar on 1 February 1918.) According to writer Natalia Borisova, her parents were Lyubov Aleksandrovna (née Borisova) and Vasily Petrovich Popov. Her mother was related to Ivan Alekseyevich Borisov, Archbishop Innocent of Kherson. Her father worked in construction, building houses, mills, and the first grain elevator in Yelets. The couple had thirteen children, but only four survived: Alexey, Nikolai, Nina, and Olya. Borisova states that Vasily died in July 1920, during the Russian Civil War, and Lyubov began working as a laundress to provide for the children and her sister, who lived with the family. During the famine in 1921–22, the daughters gathered goutweed, acorns, and nettles for soup, but there was insufficient food for the family and their mother died from illness and malnutrition soon after their father. At the time, the eldest brother was away fighting in the war, and per Borisova their aunt was sent to the poorhouse, while the girls went into the orphanage in Yelets. Despite the lack of food, Popova enjoyed her time in the orphanage, where she made friends and learned about communal living. The matron, Aleksandra Ivanovna Ryazantseva taught them how to do housework.

In 1922, Alexey returned from the war and took a position as a machinist in Borisoglebsk, (351 kilometres (218 mi) to the south east of Yelets). He brought his sisters there to live with him and his family and enrolled them in school. Popova was a good student and especially enjoyed math, but at fourteen she left school to go to work. In 1924, she was sent to the estate of the former privy counselor Kondondi to train children for the pioneer movement, a communist party youth organization. That year, she met Andrey Semenovich Shamshin and the couple married. Popova began serving as the head of the local Pioneer Bureau in 1925. For the next two years, she was a student at the Soviet Party School, a party school that trained party members assigned to organize rural workers. After her training, she taught social science courses to trade union officials in Tambov until 1929, when she started working as the director of revolutionary history at the Tambov Museum of Regional Studies. In September 1930, Popova moved to Leningrad and began studying at Leningrad State Pedagogical Institute, but was separated from her husband who had been sent to study at the Timiryazev Academy in Moscow. After a year of separation, loneliness, and illness, Popova joined her husband in Moscow, where she began studying at the Moscow Institute of Philosophy, Literature, and History. In 1931, they had a daughter, Renita, whom they named by combining the first letters of "'revolution' [revoliutsiia], 'science' [nauka], 'art' [iskusstvo], and 'labor' [trud]". In 1932, Popova joined the Communist Party of the Soviet Union, and over the next two years she completed two courses at the Moscow Institute.

== Career ==
=== Early period (1934–1945) ===
Popova began working as the vice rector of the Moscow Marxist–Leninist University for Science, Technology, and Engineering Workers in 1934. In 1937, her husband Shamshin was arrested in the Stalinist party purge. Popova sent letters to various officials in the Communist Party and worked with the editor of Pravda to prove his innocence and secure his release the following year. Earlier in 1938, she was promoted as third secretary of the Communist Party for the Krasnopresnensky District Committee. This district was a key area, and the largest and most prestigious district in Moscow, having been headed by Nikita Khrushchev in 1931. She worked as an instructor in the ideology department and was promoted within a short period to second secretary. After his release, Shamshin was sent to Dmitrov to work as an agronomist. Popova and her daughter moved into a prestigious address on Gorky Street, where their neighbors included Sergei Lemeshev, Konstantin Rokossovsky Aleksandr Tvardovsky, among other celebrities and politicians. When she discovered that her husband was involved with another woman, the couple divorced. In 1940, she served on the Moscow City Committee. Popova was appointed to serve as chair of the Council of the Krasnopresnensky District in 1941 and the following year, she became first secretary for the district's Party Committee. Shortly after she had accepted the appointment, the commander of the 107th Tank Regiment of the Leningrad Front, Vasiliy Fedorovich Orlov, came to her office for assistance with some delayed repairs on tanks. They began a relationship and married later that year.

During the early years of World War II, Popova became responsible for functioning and security in the Krasnopresnensky District. She organized the underground resistance and city patrols, made arrangements for the evacuation of residents, and developed schemes for camouflaging key facilities. She also took care of the provision of uniforms and munitions, made plans for food distribution, and established an air raid alert system to prepare for German bombing raids. Her efficiency and long working hours resulted in her being awarded both the Order of the Badge of Honour and Order of the Red Star in 1941. That year, she participated in the first meeting of the Antifascist Committee of Soviet Women (Antifashistskii Komitet Sovetskikh Zhenshchin, AKSZh). The committee worked with the Soviet Information Bureau, encouraging the public to oppose Nazi Germany and Japan and work towards peace. Throughout the war, Popova and Orlov exchanged letters and met briefly when they could. Orlov was wounded in a battle near Opole, Poland, and died in March 1945. Deeply grieving his loss, Popova devoted herself to work. That month, she was elected to serve as the secretary of the All-Union Central Council of Trade Unions, a post she held until 1957. The Council of Trade Unions was part of the Soviet Union's socio-economic welfare system. In June, she flew to France to meet with French activists from the Union des Femmes Françaises to plan an upcoming world congress aimed at organizing progressive women in the fight against fascism. In October she was chosen to lead the AKSZh, and in November 1945 she was among the Russian delegates attending the founding conference of the Women's International Democratic Federation (WIDF). She served as a WIDF vice president until 1968.

In 1949, Popova published an English-language book, Women in the Land of Socialism. Giving a glowing account of women's advances under socialism, she asserted that discrimination against women no longer existed in the Soviet Union. That year, she became a target of the Committee on Un-American Activities of the United States House of Representatives (HUAC). The HUAC report claimed that Popova, head of the Russian delegation and a vice president of the WIDF, was the most powerful member of the organization and controlled its activities. The report deemed WIDF to be a communist front, using its initiatives to spread Soviet propaganda. Gene Weltfish, a US Vice President of WIDF, was questioned about what she knew of Popova, but refused to give any information about her to HUAC attorney Robert Morris. Popova's response to attacks against herself and Soviet policies were to point out that they were meant to create discord, and ignore the facts that the Soviets had proposed an atomic weapons ban to the United Nations in 1946 and that its military had demobilized in 1947, at a time when both US and British forces were increasing militarization.

=== Activism (1945–1968) ===
Scholar Alexandra Talavar stated that Popova's activism for women's rights was rooted in the socialist framework in that she viewed gender inequality in terms of economic systems. In general, WIDF members believed and the organizational credo held that peace was a prerequisite for obtaining rights for women and children. They argued that pressure from the rich and the business community did not allow the colonial powers to introduce initiatives liable to improve the rights of working-class people. To maximize production and profitability, land and laborers were exploited, which was incompatible with their post-war vision that peace was not merely an absence of war, but a return to social justice among nations. In other words, for Popova, once peace was established private ownership could be abolished and individual lives would improve. The Antifascist Committee of Soviet Women, was renamed as the Komitet Sovetskikh Zhenshchin (Committee of Soviet Women, KSZh) in 1956. Its members were recommended by the Communist Party and the annual plans for the KSZh were subject to approval by the Central Committee of the Communist Party of the Soviet Union. The organizational funding came from the Soviet Ministry of Finance. However, Popova and the leadership chose the annual issues the organization was to focus upon, and implemented their agenda without direction from the Central Committee. As the leader of the AKSZh/KSZh, Popova laid the foundations for the activities of the organization and pushed the agenda to steer policymaking in directions that were favorable to women's advancement.

Despite claims that Popova was an "apparatchik", a derogatory label meaning that she was only a communist functionary, her positions did not always follow the party line and at times she was critical of Soviet policies. In a 1954 speech given to the Ninth Congress of Trade Unions of the USSR, Popova acknowledged that inequality in household responsibilities impacted women's advancement. In a 1956 presentation to international members of UNESCO, the United Nations Commission on the Status of Women, and the World Health Organization, she admitted that Soviet women did not have full equality because law and practice were not the same. The government position was that women had full equality, but Popova made it clear that the same opportunities were not offered to men and women. She identified access to education, anti-discrimination and labor protection legislation, child care and basic food services, economic development, and political will as areas that needed to be addressed if women were to gain equality. She also acknowledged that cultural attitudes would need to change for women to progress. Newspapers in the US in the 1960s, including an article carried in The Anniston Star in 1965, depicted Popova as friendly and frank, stating that she was not afraid to disagree with other Soviet officials who were anti-American. Popova's position, according to Talavar, was that as the leader of the Soviet women's movement, she was the face of Soviet policy to outside audiences and at times she had to be critical and recommend policy changes based on input from foreign participants in the activities of the AKSZh/KSZh.

Using her high positions in the Communist Party and her connections, Popova made proposals to the legislature to limit women's involvement in labor-intensive jobs, modify uniforms for women, expand childcare and welfare facilities and introduce training classes on hygiene and home economics to improve household and school maintenance. She also suggested that the government should study reports from the International Labour Organization, UNICEF and UNESCO and implement measures based on their evaluation to improve education, wages and working conditions, and children's well-being. AKSZh/KSZh's magazine, Sovetskaya zhenshchina (Soviet Woman), which by 1959 was published in ten languages, carried articles about leftist women and their global struggles. It was jointly published from 1945 by the All-Union Central Council of Trade Unions and AKSZh/KSZh, which were both headed by Popova. The journal focused on women's and children's issues and from the 1950s began to include broader multi-ethnic content to reflect the diversity of republics within the USSR and decolonizing countries. This change was made to turn focus away from Moscow and towards developing regions in an effort to show that the Soviet modernization model was adaptable to global markets. In other words, rather than monoculturalism, the new message was that socialism could provide a socio-economic system which allowed women and children to thrive and was respectful of traditional culture. To improve women's involvement, the KSZh, under Popova's leadership, provided funding for women to participate in its conferences, as well as those of the WIDF and United Nations. The organization also funded educational stipends for women and girls from developing countries.

=== Later career (1950–1977) ===
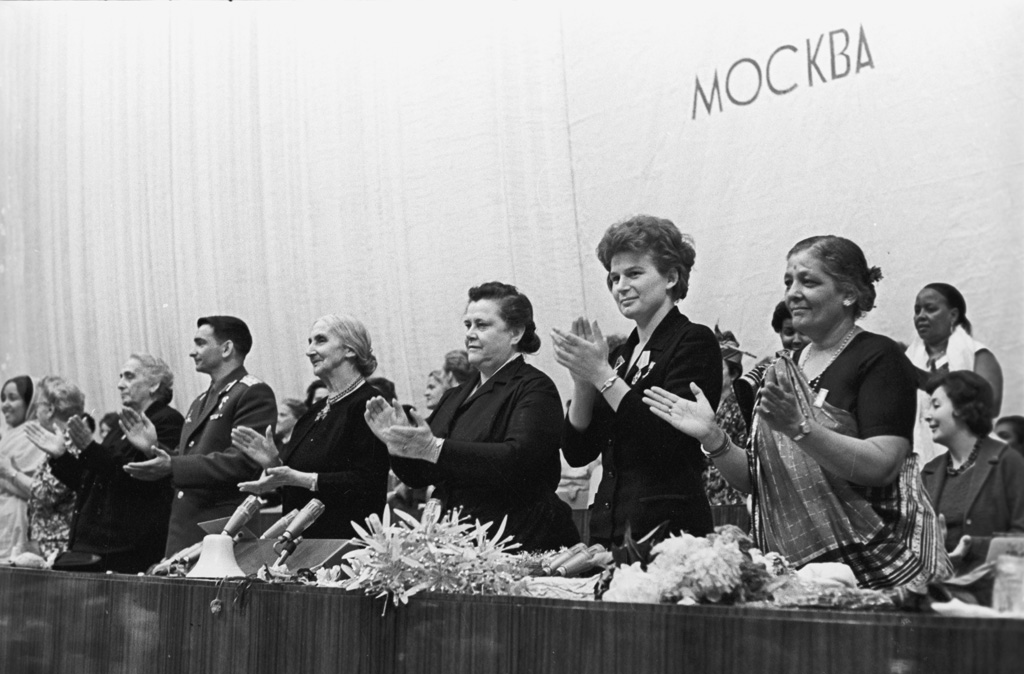
1963 World Women's Congress, at the Kremlin Palace: (Front row, l-r) Dolores Ibárruri (Spain), Valery Bykovsky (Soviet cosmonaut), Eugénie Cotton (France), Popova, Valentina Tereshkova (Soviet cosmonaut), and Kapila Khandwala (India)

Popova held numerous high positions in government and organizations of the Communist Party. In 1950, she was elected as a deputy of the Supreme Soviet of the Soviet Union. and re-elected as a deputy in 1954, 1958, 1962, 1966, 1970, and 1974. Elected as a candidate to the Central Committee of the Communist Party in 1956, she became a full member in 1961, a position she held until 1976. From 1957, Popova was chair of the executive council of the Vsesoiuznoe Obshchestvo Kul'turnoi Sviazi s zagranitsei (All-Union Society for Cultural Relations with Foreign Countries, VOKS), which in 1958 was renamed the Soyuz sovetskikh obshchestv druzhby i kul'turnoy svyazi s zarubezhnymi stranami (Union of Soviet Societies for Foreign Friendship and Cultural Relations, SSOD). VOKS was designed to foster the exchange of scientific and cultural knowledge and promote collaboration between Soviet and international organizations. Popova encouraged interaction between Soviet citizens and foreigners because she believed that engagement with others could overcome prejudices and the effects of negative propaganda, and thus strengthen peace. She served as its chair until 1975.

As the head of VOKS, Popova visited the United States in the 1960s and often visited with US citizens abroad. On a 1960 trip with her daughter, she arrived just days after a US U-2 spy plane was shot down by the Soviet Air Defence Forces. Despite the strain on diplomatic relations caused by the incident, she stressed the importance of continuing work to thaw the Cold War relations. Popova spent three weeks traveling throughout the country, visiting Washington, D.C., New York City, Detroit, Philadelphia, Boston, Phoenix, the Grand Canyon, and Los Angeles. Throughout her trip, she urged peace and cooperation between the two countries to foster friendship. She delivered the same message to visiting officials, women's group representatives, and astronauts, suggesting that cultural exchange would improve relations. She encouraged academics, students, and scientists to exchange information and cooperate with each other. Popova also served on the World Peace Council, the Soviet Afro-Asian Solidarity Committee, the Sovetskogo komiteta za yevropeyskuyu bezopasnost' i sotrudnichestvo (Soviet Committee for European Security and Cooperation), and the executive board of the Soviet Committee for the Defense of Peace. She received the Lenin Peace Prize for Strengthening Peace among Nations in 1953 and was honored twice with the Order of Lenin and the Order of the Red Banner of Labour, and once with the Order of the October Revolution.

== Death and legacy ==
Popova died 30 May 1994 in Moscow and was buried in the Novodevichy Cemetery. During her lifetime, she was known for her involvement in influential organizations, policymaking, and relationships with global leaders. Despite her prominence, no obituary for her was published in a major newspaper and the only commemorations of her life have been at events like an exhibit held in Yelets in 2018 for her 110th birthday. Both of the biographies that have been written about her focused on her relationships rather than her political career. She has rarely been mentioned in English-language works. Historian Francisca de Haan stated that Cold War perceptions of communist women being "aggressive and dangerous", led to little scholarship in the West on figures like Popova and Romanian activist Ana Pauker. The perception that women activists in the period between Stalin and Brezhnev were merely party operatives and did not genuinely engage in women's rights issues has curtailed research into the activities of Popova and other feminist actors who were engaged after the period of Bolshevik feminism. Official narratives in her time tended to stress the importance of collective action more than individual effort, which has created difficulty in assessing Popova's role. Talavar stated that Popova played a pivotal role in the fight for women's agency in the era. She concluded from researching Popova's archival record that studying her life confirms that women's advances in the period were not simply given by the state because of "women-friendly policies", but rather gained after significant struggle.

== Selected works ==
- Popova, Nina (1949). Women in the Land of Socialism. Moscow, USSR: Foreign Languages Publishing House. OCLC 1137064835.
- Popova, Nina (1966). Zhenshchiny Mira i Sovremennost [Women of the World and Modernity] (in Russian). Moscow, USSR: Znanie. OCLC 4186550.
- Popova, Nina (1967). The Part Played by Women in Socialist Society. Moscow, USSR: Komitet sovetskikh zhenshchin. OCLC 63549203.
