= Bereslavka, Ukraine =

Rural locality in Kirovohrad Oblast, Ukraine

Bereslavka Береславка Yanovka
- Village
- Location in Ukraine Bereslavka (Ukraine)
- Coordinates: 47°53′34″N 32°17′25″E
- Country: Ukraine
- Oblast: Kirovohrad Oblast
- Raion: Kropyvnytskyi Raion
- Hromada: Ketrysanivka rural hromada

Population (2001)
  - Total: 139
- Time zone: UTC+2 (EET)
  - Summer (DST): UTC+3 (EEST)
- Postal code: 27244
- Area code: +380 5257

Bereslavka (Ukrainian: Береславка), formerly known as Yanovka (Russian: Яновка) or Yanivka (Ukrainian: Янівка), is a village in Kropyvnytskyi Raion, Kirovohrad Oblast, Ukraine. The village has a population of 139 (2001). Bereslavka was part of the Vasylivka village council and belongs to Ketrysanivka rural hromada, one of the hromadas of Ukraine. It is the birthplace of Marxist theorist and politician Leon Trotsky as well as his sister, Olga Kameneva.

Until 18 July 2020, Bereslavka belonged to Bobrynets Raion. The raion was abolished in July 2020, as part of the administrative reform of Ukraine, which reduced the number of raions of Kirovohrad Oblast to four. The area of Bobrynets Raion was merged into Kropyvnytskyi Raion.
