= Vladimir Kemenov =

Soviet art historian and statesman

Vladimir Semyonovich Kemenov (Russian: Владимир Семёнович Кеменов; 2 June 1908 – 14 June 1988) was a Soviet art historian and statesman who was Director of the State Tretyakov Gallery, headed the VOKS for the USSR in the 1940s, was Deputy Minister of Culture in 1954-1956 and vice-president of the Academy of Arts in 1966-1988.

== Life and career ==
He was born in Yekaterinoslav (now Dnipro).

In 1938-1940 — Director of the State Tretyakov Gallery. Member of the All-Union Communist Party (bolsheviks) since 1939.

In 1940, he succeeded Viktor Smirnov as chairman of VOKS ("Vsesoiuznoe Obshchestvo Kul'turnoi Sviazi s zagranitsei" — Всесоюзное общество культурной связи с заграницей — All-Union Society for Cultural Relations with Foreign Countries), a propaganda organization created in 1925 and restructured in 1958.

VOKS also often served as a convenient 'roof' for operations of both branches of Soviet intelligence, whose residents and operatives used opportunities provided by VOKS to establish and maintain contacts in intellectual, scientific and government circles. These contacts were, for the most part, unaware that they were dealing not with 'cultural representatives' and diplomats, but with intelligence officers.

In 1944, Mihail Sadoveanu hosted official Soviet envoys Kemenov and Andrey Vyshinsky in Romania shortly before he became president of the ARLUS "Literary and Philosophical Section."

On June 23, 1945, Kemenov wrote the Soviet National Council of Foreign Affairs to request that the Soviet Union send artists to the United States and United Kingdom; the request met little interest. In 1947, Kemenov joined Alexander Fadeyev in asking the USSR to invite American writer John Steinbeck to visit; the Kremlin declined.

In 1948, Andrei Denisov succeeded Kemenov as chairman through 1957. In 1958, VOKS became the Union of Soviet Societies for Friendship and Cultural Contacts (SSOD), itself disbanded in 1992 following the dissolution of the Soviet Union in December 1991.

In 1939-1953 — Scientific Secretary of the Committee for Stalin Prizes.

In 1950, Kemenov was deputy director of the Institute of Art History.

In 1954, elected Full member of the Academy of Arts of the USSR.

In 1954-1956 — Deputy Minister of Culture of the USSR.

In 1956-1958 — Permanent Representative of the USSR to UNESCO.

Since 1960, he was nominated to direct the Contemporary foreign art sector at the Institute of Art History of the USSR.

Since 1966, he was nominated vice-president of the Academy of Arts. He worked for 22 years as vice-president of the Academy, and supervised the foreign department of the Academy and exhibitions of foreign artists in the USSR.

He died in Moscow, and was buried in the Kuntsevo Cemetery.

== Works ==
In 1947, Kemenov published an article "Features of Two Cultures" in English, French, German, and Russian that caught wide attention during early years of the Cold War. Arthur M. Schlesinger Jr. noted that Kemenov had attacked artists Pablo Picasso, Henry Moore, Georgia O'Keeffe, Paul Cézanne among others. In a 1950 article, Kemenov defended Socialist realism and Marxist–Leninist theory of history and attacked bourgeois art historians in a manner "lurid and angry."

Clement Greenberg answered Kemenov's article with "Greenberg, C. Irrelevance versus Irresponsibility // Partisan Review. 1948. Vol. 15. No. 5". Greenberg's main complaints were not only about Kemenov's aesthetic views, but also about his vivid anti-American attacks.

- V. Kemenov. Against Formalism and Naturalism in Painting (“Pravda”, March 6 and 26, 1936) // Against Formalism and Naturalism in Art: A Collection of Articles. — [Moscow]: OGIZ — IZOGIZ Editions, 1937.
- "Aspects of Two Cultures" (aka "Features of Two Cultures"), in Russian: «Черты двух культур», first in “Iskusstvo” magazine (журнал «Искусство»), Moscow, July-August 1947
- "Aspects of Two Cultures" (aka "Features of Two Cultures") (in English), Voks Bulletin (1947)
- "Against Reactionary Bourgeois Art and Art Criticism" ("Protiv burzhuazanogo iskusstiva i iskusstvozvnaniya") Moscow: Publishing House of the USSR Academy of Sciences (1951)
- On the Objective Nature of the Laws of Realistic Art. Moscow, “Knowledge”(“Znanie”) Editions, 1954
- Articles on Art (“Статьи об искусстве”). Moscow, 1956;
- Vladimir Kemenov. Reactionary aspirations under the flag of "innovation" // “Iskusstvo” magazine. 1963, No. 7. (Кеменов, Владимир Семёнович. Реакционные устремления под флагом «новаторства» // Журнал «Искусство». 1963. № 7
- “Against Abstract Art. Debates about Realism”. Leningrad, “Khudozhnik RSFSR”, 1963.
- "Surikov's Historical Painting. 1870-1880s". Moscow, 1963;
- "Against Abstract Art. Debates about Realism". Collection of articles, 2nd edition, Moscow, 1969;
- "Velázquez's Paintings", Moscow, 1969.
- Vasily Surikov, 1848–1916 (1970) about painter Vasili Ivanovich Surikov
- Velázquez in Soviet Museums: Analysis and Interpretation of the Paintings in the Context of His Oeuvre (1979)
