= Olga Kameneva =

Russian Bolshevik revolutionary (1883–1941)

- Ольга Каменева
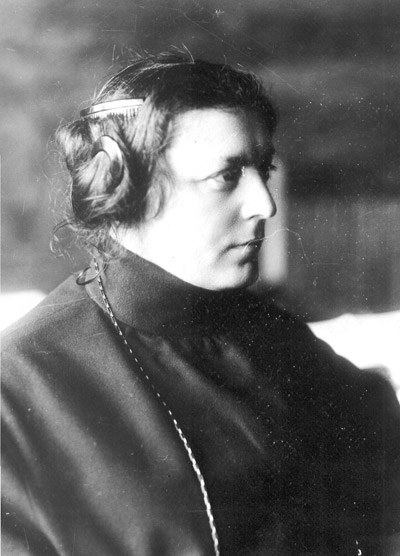
- Kameneva in 1926

Chairwoman of the Soviet Society for Cultural Relations with Foreign Countries
- In office 1926–28

Personal details
- Born: 19 November 1883 (N.S.) Yanovka, Kherson Governorate, Russian Empire
- Died: 11 September 1941 (aged 57) Medvedev Forest, Russian SFSR, Soviet Union
- Party: RSDLP (1902–1912); Bolsheviks (1912–1918); CPSU (1918–1936)
- Spouse: Lev Kamenev (m. 1902; div. 1928)
- Relations: Leon Trotsky (elder brother)
- Children: 2

Olga Davidovna Kameneva (Russian: Ольга Давыдовна Каменева, Ukrainian: Ольга Давидiвна Каменева; 19 November [O.S. 7 November] 1883 – 11 September 1941) (née Bronstein — Бронште́йн) was a Russian Bolshevik revolutionary and a Soviet politician. She was the sister of Leon Trotsky and the first wife of Lev Kamenev.

== Childhood and revolutionary career (1883–1917) ==
Olga Bronstein was born in Yanovka, Kherson Governorate, Russian Empire (present-day Kirovohrad Oblast, Ukraine), a small village 15 miles from the nearest post office. She was one of two daughters of a wealthy but illiterate farmer, David Leontyevich Bronstein (or Bronshtein, 1847–1922), a Jew, and Anna Lvovna (née Zhivotovskaya) (1850–1910). Although the family was of Jewish extraction, they were not religious and the languages spoken at home were Russian and Ukrainian, not Yiddish.

Olga joined the Russian Social Democratic Labour Party in 1902 and soon married Lev Kamenev, a fellow Marxist revolutionary. In 1908, after Kamenev's release from prison, the couple left Russia for Geneva and then Paris, where Kamenev became one of Vladimir Lenin's two deputies. The couple helped Lenin edit the main Bolshevik magazine Proletariy. In January 1914, the Kamenevs moved to St. Petersburg so that Lev could be in immediate control of the Bolsheviks' legal newspaper Pravda and their Duma faction.

== Theater and CPSU's Women's Section (1918–1920) ==
In early 1918, after the October Revolution of 1917, Kameneva was put in charge of the Theater Division (TEO) of the People's Commissariat for Education. Working with theatrical director and theorist Vsevolod Meyerhold, she tried to radicalize Russian theaters, effectively nationalizing them under Bolshevik control. However, Meyerhold came down with tuberculosis in May 1919 and had to leave for the South. In his absence, the head of the Commissariat, Anatoly Lunacharsky, secured Lenin's permission to revise government policy in favor of more traditional theaters and dismissed Kameneva in June.

From the time it was organized in October 1919, Kameneva was a member of the board of directors of the Soviet Communist Party's Women's Section. In 1920, she supported People's Commissar of Public Health Nikolai Semashko's opinion that contraception was "unquestionably harmful" and should not be advocated.

== Managing Soviet contacts with the West (1921–1928) ==
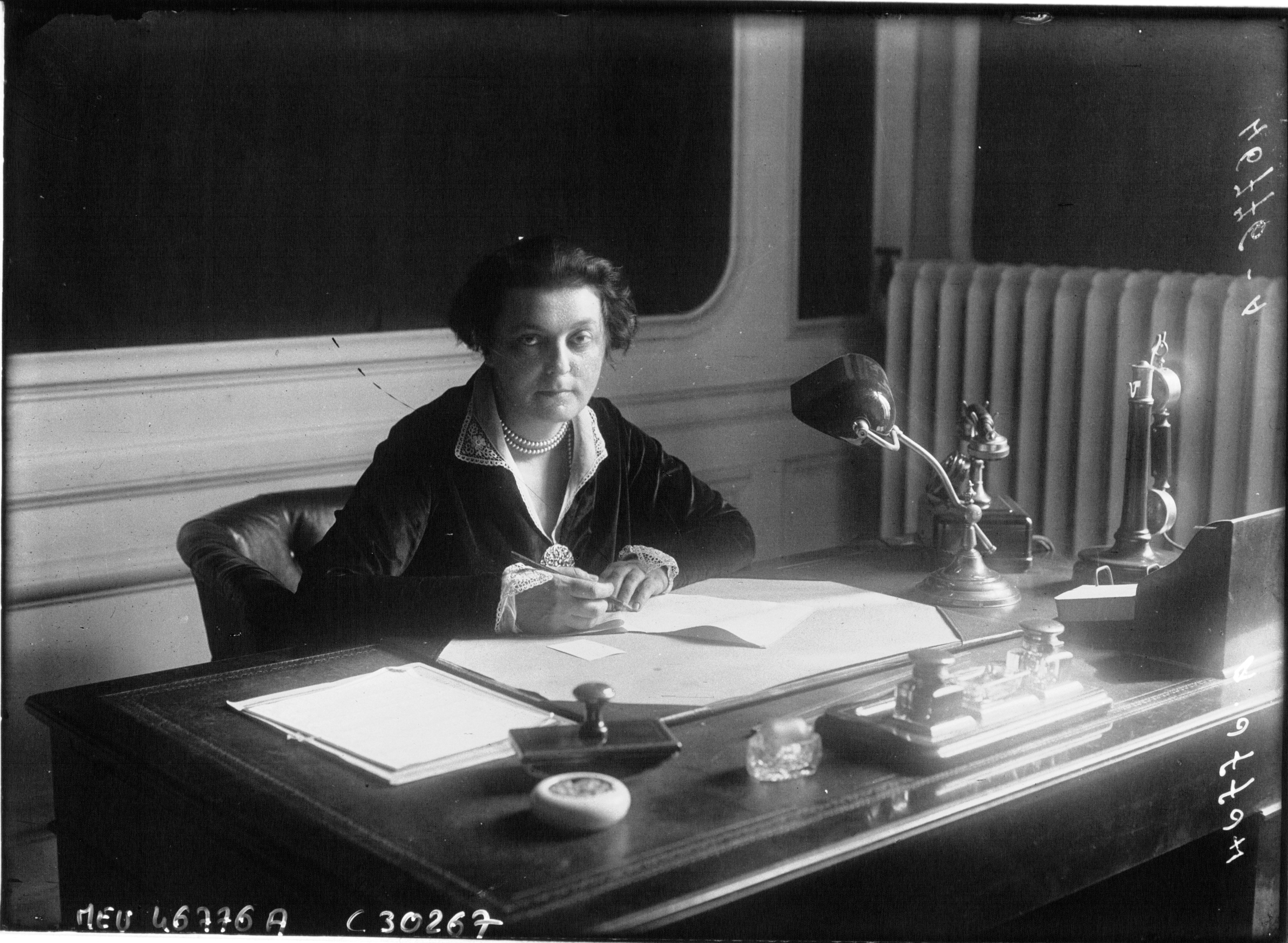
Kameneva in her office in 1927

Between 1921 and 1923, Kameneva was a leading member of the Central Commission for Fighting the After-Effects of the Famine and oversaw a propaganda campaign against the American Relief Administration (ARA) under Herbert Hoover in the Soviet press. Between 1923 and 1925, she was the head of the Commission for Foreign Relief (KZP), a Soviet governmental commission that regulated and then liquidated remaining Western charities in the Soviet Union. From 1926 to 1928, Kameneva served as chairman of the USSR Society for Cultural Relations with Foreign Countries ("Voks", Vsesoiuznoe Obshchestvo Kul'turnoi Sviazi s Zagranitsei) In that capacity she greeted many prominent Western visitors to the Soviet Union, e.g. Le Corbusier and Theodore Dreiser, and represented the Soviet Union at the festivities in Vienna commemorating the centennial of Ludwig van Beethoven's death in March–April 1927. Throughout the 1920s, she also ran a leading literary salon in Moscow.

In 1927, shortly before she was removed from office, the composer Sergei Prokofiev visited her in the Kremlin. He wrote in his dairy that "Olga Davidovna herself seemed to be a lively, agreeable, somewhat American-style lady" whose office was "an enormous room, quite comfortably appointed with magnificent armchairs, sofas, many bookcases and bookshelves."

In the early 1920s, Kameneva's family life began to disintegrate, starting with Lev Kamenev's reputed affair with the British sculptor Clare Sheridan in 1920. In the late 1920s, he left Kameneva for Tatiana Glebova, with whom he had a son, Vladimir Glebov (1929–1994).

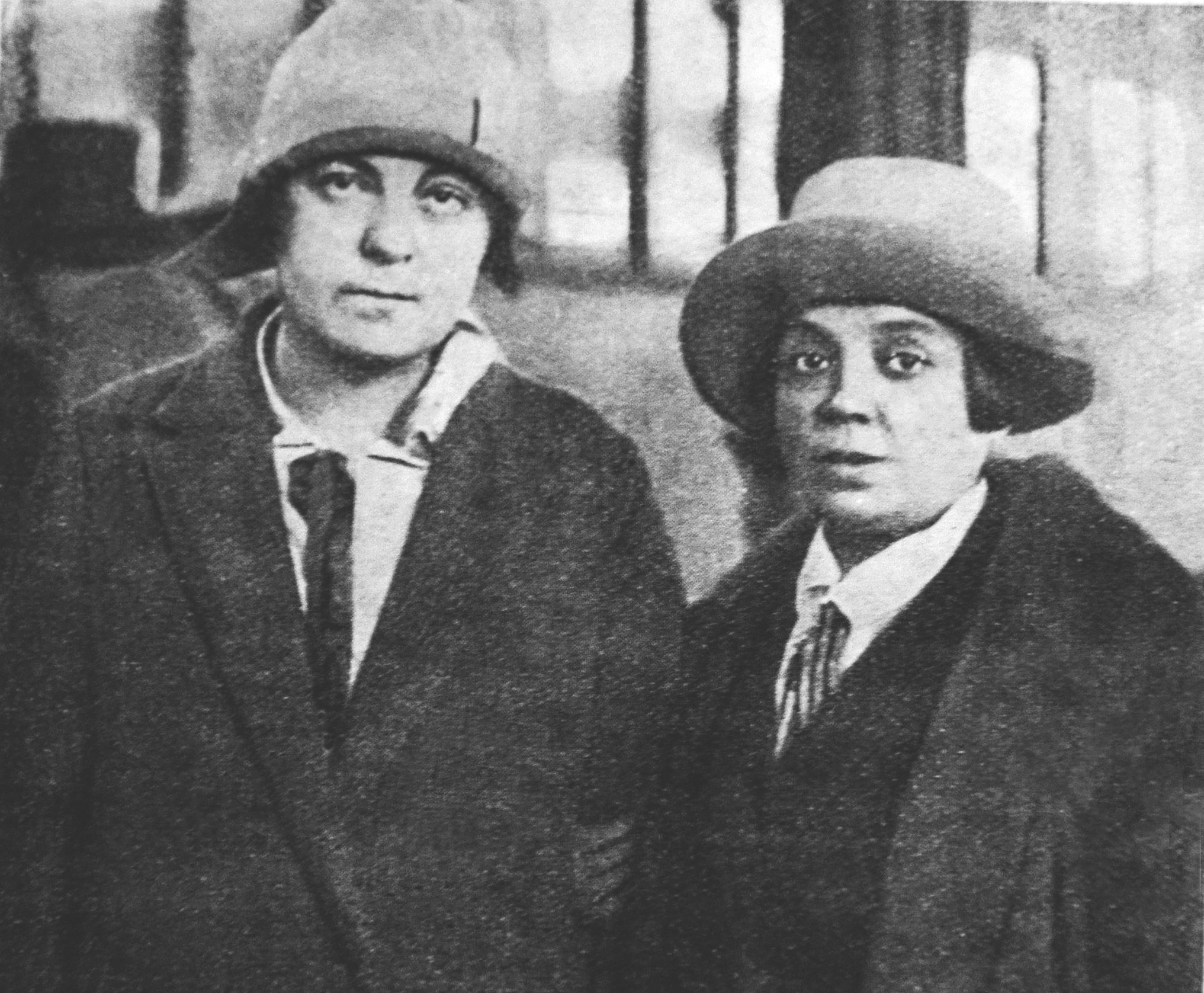
Olga Kameneva (left) and Lidiya Seifullina, in 1927

== Fall from power and execution (1928–1941) ==
Kameneva quickly lost her influence after Kamenev and Trotsky's defeat at the Communist Party Congress in December 1927. On 27 July 1935, the NKVD (Soviet secret police) Special Board banned her from Moscow and Leningrad for 5 years in connection with the Kremlin Affair. After Lev Kamenev's show trial and execution on 25 August 1936, she was arrested and imprisoned. Her younger son, Yuri Lvovich Kamenev, was executed on 30 January 1938 at the age of 17. Her older son, Air Force officer Alexander Lvovich Kamenev, was executed on 15 July 1939 at the age of 33. Her brother (Leon Trotsky) was attacked in Mexico City on 20 August 1940 and died the next day.

In 1941, Kameneva was in Oryol Prison. She was shot on 11 September in the Medvedev forest outside Oryol together with Christian Rakovsky, Maria Spiridonova and 160 other prominent political prisoners in the Medvedev Forest massacre. This execution was one of the many NKVD prisoner massacres committed in 1941.

== In popular culture ==
Kameneva is the main protagonist in the novel, The Impossible History of Trotsky's Sister by Maree F. Roberts, published in June 2021. In the novel, she is given a second, imagined life in Melbourne, Australia, after World War Two.

== See also ==
- Outline of the Russian Revolution and Civil War
- Bibliography of the Russian Revolution and Civil War
- Bibliography of Stalinism and the Soviet Union
- Index of Old Bolsheviks
- Index of articles related to the Russian Revolution and Civil War
