= Marina Dobrovolskaya =

Member of the State Duma (1st convocation)

- Марина Карамановна Добровольская
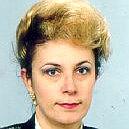
- Born: 9 August 1960 (age 66); Tianeti, Georgian SSR, USSR
- Citizenship: USSR, Russia
- Education: Moscow Pedagogical State University
- Occupations: Politician, member of the State Duma
- Movement: the Women of Russia political movement

Marina Karamanovna Dobrovolskaya (Russian: Марина Карамановна Добровольская; born 9 August 1960) is a Russian politician, a deputy of the State Duma of the Federal Assembly of the Russian Federation of the first convocation, Chair of the Russian Union of Women of the Navy, and Co-Chair of the political movement Women of Russia.

== Biography ==
In 1984, she received higher pedagogical education from the Moscow State Pedagogical Institute. She holds the degree of Doctor of Pedagogical Sciences.

From 1977 to 1981, she worked as an educational psychologist at a secondary school in Moscow. From 1981 to 1993, she worked at the Main Headquarters of the Navy as an assistant to the head of a department. She was a civilian employee.

In 1992, she founded and headed the Union of Women of the Navy. Since 1993, she has served as Co-Chair of the political movement Women of Russia.

In 1993, she was elected as a deputy of the State Duma of the Federal Assembly of the Russian Federation of the first convocation. In the State Duma, she was a member of the Committee on Defense and belonged to the Women of Russia faction.

From 1996 to 1999, she worked in the Apparatus of the State Duma as an adviser to the Analytical Directorate.

In 1997, she graduated from the Diplomatic Academy of the Ministry of Foreign Affairs of the Russian Federation.

On 26 April 1997, by Presidential Decree No. 419, M. K. Dobrovolskaya was awarded the civil service rank of State Councillor of the Russian Federation, 3rd class.

In the 2011 elections, she was nominated by A Just Russia, holding the second position in the Murmansk regional group.
