= 1993 Russian legislative election =

- 12 December 1993

All 450 seats to the State Duma 226 seats needed for a majority
- Turnout: 54.33% (▼22.07 pp)
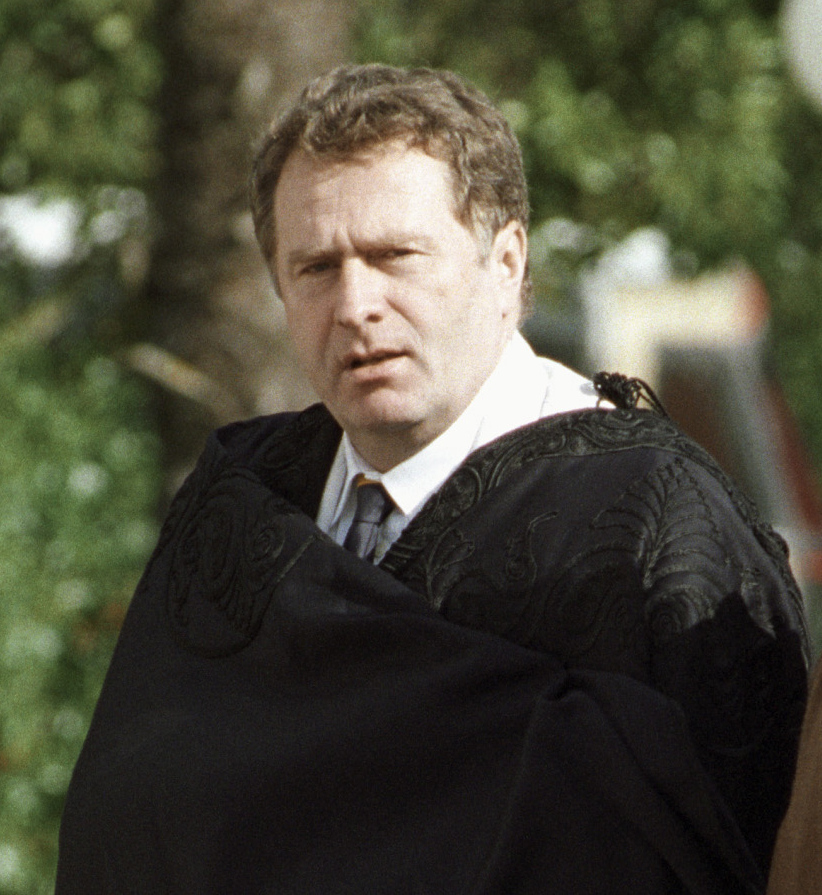

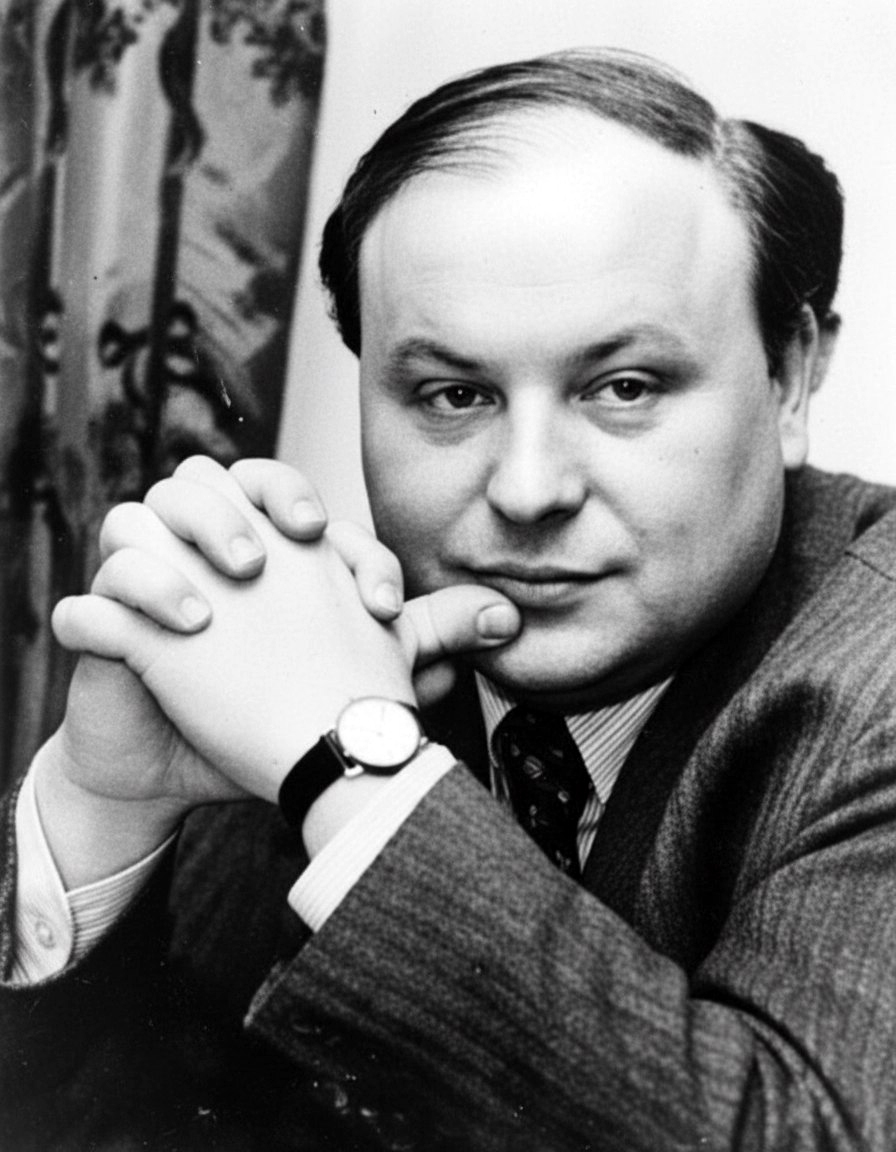

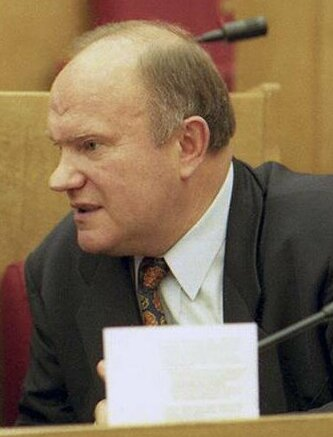

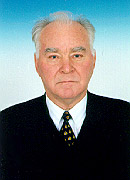

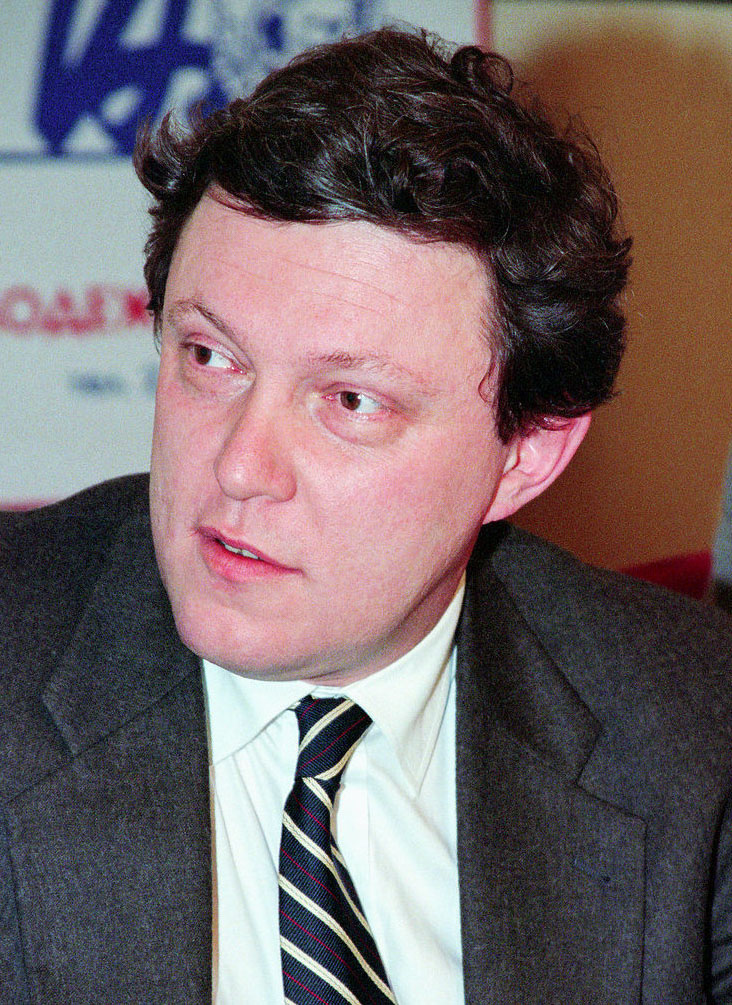

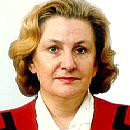

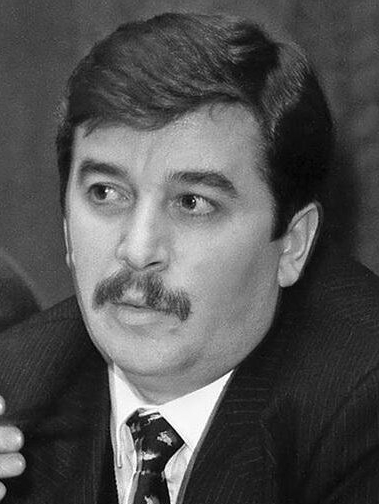

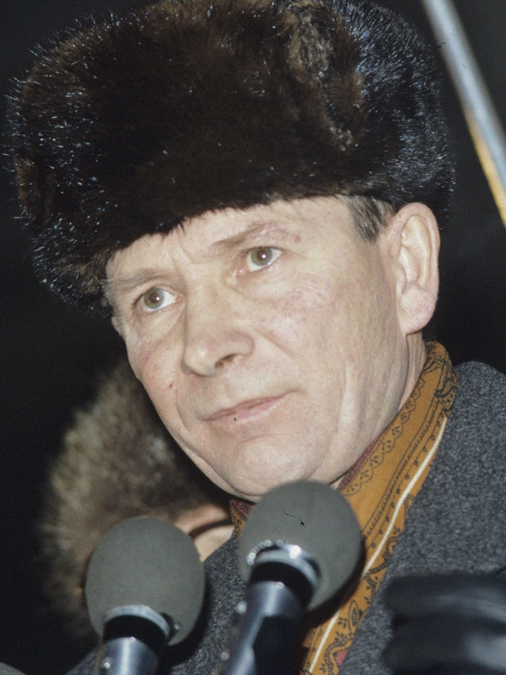

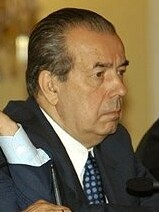
	First party	Second party	Third party
Leader	Vladimir Zhirinovsky	Yegor Gaidar	Gennady Zyuganov
Party	LDPR	Choice of Russia	CPRF
Leader since	13 December 1989	16 October 1993	14 February 1993
Leader's seat	Shchyolkovo	Federal list	Federal list
Seats won	64	62	42
Popular vote	12,318,562	8,339,345	6,666,402
Percentage	22.92% (Note: Party list vote)	15.51%	12.40%
	Fourth party	Fifth party	Sixth party
Leader	Mikhail Lapshin	Grigory Yavlinsky	Alevtina Fedulova
Party	APR	YaBL	Women of Russia
Leader since	26 February 1993	16 October 1993	1 October 1993
Leader's seat	Federal list	Federal list	Federal list
Seats won	38	27	24
Popular vote	4,292,518	4,223,219	4,369,918
Percentage	7.99%	7.86%	8.13%
	Seventh party	Eighth party	Ninth party
Leader	Sergey Shakhray	Nikolay Travkin	Arkady Volsky
Party	PRES	DPR	Civic Union
Leader since	17 October 1993	26 May 1990	21 October 1993
Leader's seat	Federal list	Federal list	Federal list (lost)
Seats won	22	15	7
Popular vote	3,620,035	2,969,533	1,038,193
Percentage	6.73%	5.52%	1.93%
Chairman of the Supreme Soviet before election
Ruslan Khasbulatov (Note: Until 4 October 1993)
Independent
Chairman of the State Duma after
Ivan Rybkin
APR

Parliamentary elections were held in Russia on 12 December 1993 to elect all 450 seats of the 1st State Duma of the Russian Federation. Additionally, the elections were the first and only instance of direct elections to the Federation Council, with future members appointed by provincial legislatures and governors.

The far-right Liberal Democratic Party of Russia party won 64 seats, making it the largest group in the State Duma. The pro-government Choice of Russia bloc came second with 62 seats, and the anti-government Communist Party of the Russian Federation came third with 42. Five seats in Tatarstan were left vacant due to turnout below 25%, and one seat in Chechnya was also unfilled.

The elections were held concurrently with the 1993 Russian constitutional referendum.

== Background ==
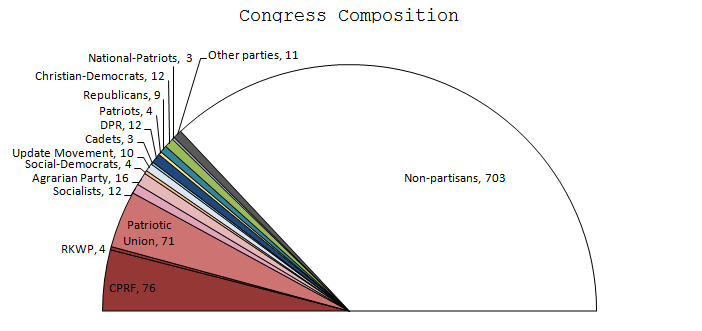
Make up of the Congress of People's Deputies in March 1993

Since January 1993 members of the Congress of People's Deputies of Russia had been working on new electoral legislation. Despite being unaffiliated with President Boris Yeltsin's inner circle, their proposal was used as a template for the new electoral system. Yeltsin and his allies hoped to create a parliament sympathetic to his reform agenda and minimise elements that were critical of his programme.

On 21 September Yeltsin dissolved both the Congress of People's Deputies and the Supreme Soviet. Alexander Rutskoy called Yeltsin's move a step toward a coup d'état. The next day, the Constitutional Court held that Yeltsin had violated the constitution and could be impeached. During an all-night session, parliament declared the president's decree null and void. This began the 1993 Russian constitutional crisis.

Yeltsin's victory against parliament in the crisis led to his electoral law being enacted, and his preferred constitutional draft being put to referendum. Reformist parties supportive of Yeltsin were unsure how they would fare under the new electoral system.

At this time, most political parties were not well-established, and instead functioned more akin to parliamentary groups than political parties. The parties with the most established organisational structures were the Communist Party of the Russian Federation, and the Agrarian Party of Russia. Development of parliamentary parties had been majorly affected by crises in Russian politics and those with less established structures had a small window of time to prepare for campaigning.

There were a total of 490 candidates competing for seats in the Federation Council, and for the State Duma, there were 1,757 candidates on party lists for the proportional representation seats, and 1,567 candidates running for the first-past-the-post electoral district seats.

== Electoral system ==
The new election law adopted for the 1993 Duma election introduced a parallel voting system, with 225 of the 450 seats being party-list proportional seats, and the other 225 being single-member constituency seats elected via first-past-the-post voting. Every voter thus received two different ballots, one for each kind of seats. The party-list proportional representation ballot required each voter to endorse an electoral organization or vote against all of them. By contrast, the single-member constituency ballot required a voter to endorse an individual, whose party affiliation, if any, could not be given on the ballot.

The new election law also saw the introduction of an 'Against all' option on ballots.

In order to nominate a list of candidates for the party-list proportional representation ballot, a party or electoral alliance had to gather 100,000 signatures from the electorate, of which no more than 15% could be from any one region or republic. The method used to calculate the number of seats won by each party was the Hare method, with a threshold of 5% of the valid vote, including votes cast against all, but excluding invalid ballots.

To secure a place on a single-member constituency ballot, candidates had to gather the signatures of at least 1% of that constituency's electorate. The winner in each single-member districts contest was simply the candidate with the plurality of votes, regardless of the number of votes cast against all.

Additionally, an election was held for the upper house, the Federation Council. Each of the 89 federal subjects of Russia served as a dual-member constituency, meaning a total of 178 seats. The two most voted-for candidates winning the seats. As the new constitution stated, both houses were elected for a two-year term.

== Political parties/blocs ==
No.	Bloc	Abbr.	First three party-list candidates	Political position	Ideologies	Notes
1	Agrarian Party of Russia	APR	Mikhail Lapshin • Alexander Davydov • Alexander Zaveryukha	Left-wing	Agrarian socialism / Collectivism	
2	Yavlinsky–Boldyrev–Lukin; RPRF, SDPR, RHDS–ND	YaBL	Grigory Yavlinsky • Vladimir Lukin • Aleksey Mikhaylov (Note: YaBL's No. 2 candidate, Yury Boldyrev, withdrew from the list to run for Federation Council.)	Centre-left	Social democracy / Social liberalism	
3	Future of Russia–New Names; NPSR, "Civic Union" Association	BRNI	Vyacheslav Laschevsky • Oleg Sokolov • Vladimir Mironov	Centre	Youth politics / Social policies	
4	Choice of Russia; VR, DR, PDI, KPR	VR	Yegor Gaidar • Sergei Kovalev • Ella Pamfilova	Centre-right	Conservative liberalism / Liberal conservatism	
5	Civic Union for Stability, Justice and Progress; RSPP, Renewal, RSDC, APPR, VVZM	GS	Arkady Volsky • Nikolay Bekh • Alexander Vladislavlev	Centre to centre-left	Social democracy / Anti-Yeltsinism / Federalism	
6	Democratic Party of Russia	DPR	Nikolay Travkin • Stanislav Govorukhin • Oleg Bogomolov	Centre-right	Conservatism	
7	Dignity and Charity; VSV, VOI, Chernobyl Union of Russia	DM	Konstantin Frolov • Nikolai Gubenko • Vyacheslav Grishin	Big tent	Federalism / Veterans' rights / Disabled rights	
8	Communist Party of the Russian Federation	KPRF	Gennady Zyuganov • Vitaly Sevastyanov • Viktor Ilyukhin	Left-wing to far-left	Communism / Marxism–Leninism / Left-wing nationalism	
9	Constructive-Ecological Movement of Russia "Kedr"	KEDR	Lyubov Lymar • Vladimir Chiburayev • Stanislav Baranov	Centre to centre-left	Green politics / Agrarianism	
10	Liberal Democratic Party of Russia	LDPR	Vladimir Zhirinovsky • Viktor Kobelev • Vyacheslav Marychev	Right-wing to far-right	Right-wing populism / Pan-Slavism	
11	Party of Russian Unity and Accord	PRES	Sergey Shakhray • Alexander Shokhin • Konstantin Zatulin	Centre-right	Moderate liberalism / Conservatism / Regionalism	
12	Women of Russia	ZhR	Alevtina Fedulova • Ekaterina Lakhova • Natalya Gundareva	Centre	Women's rights / Pacifism	
13	Russian Democratic Reform Movement	RDDR	Anatoly Sobchak • Svyatoslav Fyodorov • Oleg Basilashvili	Centre	Liberal democracy / Federalism	

== Opinion polls ==
Parties with more than 5% support are given in bold.

Polling firm	Fieldwork date	LDPR	VR	CPRF	YaBL	ZhR	DPR	RDDR	PRES	APR	GS	BRNI	DM	KEDR	Against all	Unsure	Not voting
FOM	1 Dec 1993	3	**29**	**8.2**	**18.7**	**6.5**	**7.2**	**6.5**	**5.8**	3.7	**6**	—N/a	—N/a	—N/a	—N/a	—N/a	—N/a
ISPR RAS	4–5 Dec 1993	**11**	**14**	4	**8**	**10**	**6**	4	3	2	1	4	**9**	**5**	2	13	21
ISPR RAS (exit poll)	12 Dec 1993	**18**	**22**	**11**	**12**	**8**	**6**	**5**	**5**	4	3	2	1	1	2	—N/a	2

== Results ==
=== State Duma ===

Party	Party-list			Constituency			Total seats
Party	Votes	%	Seats	Votes	%	Seats	Total seats
Liberal Democratic Party of Russia	12,318,562	22.92	59	1,604,785	3.04	5	64
Choice of Russia	8,339,345	15.51	37	3,608,497	6.84	25	62
Communist Party of the Russian Federation	6,666,402	12.40	32	1,848,888	3.50	10	42
Women of Russia	4,369,918	8.13	22	309,378	0.59	2	24
Agrarian Party of Russia	4,292,518	7.99	22	2,879,410	5.46	16	38
Yavlinsky–Boldyrev–Lukin	4,223,219	7.86	20	1,854,447	3.52	7	27
Party of Russian Unity and Accord	3,620,035	6.73	19	1,433,158	2.72	3	22
Democratic Party of Russia	2,969,533	5.52	14	1,142,830	2.17	1	15
Russian Democratic Reform Movement	2,191,505	4.08	0	1,038,068	1.97	4	4
Civic Union	1,038,193	1.93	0	1,591,476	3.02	7	7
Future of Russia–New Names	672,283	1.25	0	411,426	0.78	1	1
Constructive-Ecological Movement "Kedr"	406,789	0.76	0	301,266	0.57	0	0
Dignity and Charity	375,431	0.70	0	445,168	0.84	3	3
Independents				26,171,737	49.61	135	135
Against all	2,267,963	4.22	–	8,117,106	15.39	–	–
Vacant (Note: Five seats in Tatarstan were left vacant due to a low turnout (less than 25%) and were elected at a later date, whilst one seat in Chechnya remained unfilled.)						6	6
**Total**	**53,751,696**	**100.00**	**225**	**52,757,640**	**100.00**	**225**	**450**
Valid votes	53,751,696	93.19					
Invalid/blank votes	3,928,002	6.81					
Total votes	**57,679,698**	**100.00**					
Registered voters/turnout	106,170,835	54.33		106,170,835	–		
Source: Nohlen & Stöver, University of Essex, Boschler, CEC

=== Federation Council ===
Although the Federation Council was contested on a non-party basis, 11 were members of the Communist Party, six were members of Russia's Choice and nine were members of other parties.

Party	Votes	%	Seats
Independents	53,751,696	100.00	171
Vacant (Note: Five seats were elected at a later date, whilst two seats in Chechnya remained unfilled.)			7
**Total**	**53,751,696**	**100.00**	**178**
Valid votes	53,751,696	93.16	
Invalid/blank votes	3,946,002	6.84	
Total votes	**57,697,698**	**100.00**	
Registered voters/turnout	106,170,835	54.34	
Source: Nohlen & Stöver

== Aftermath ==
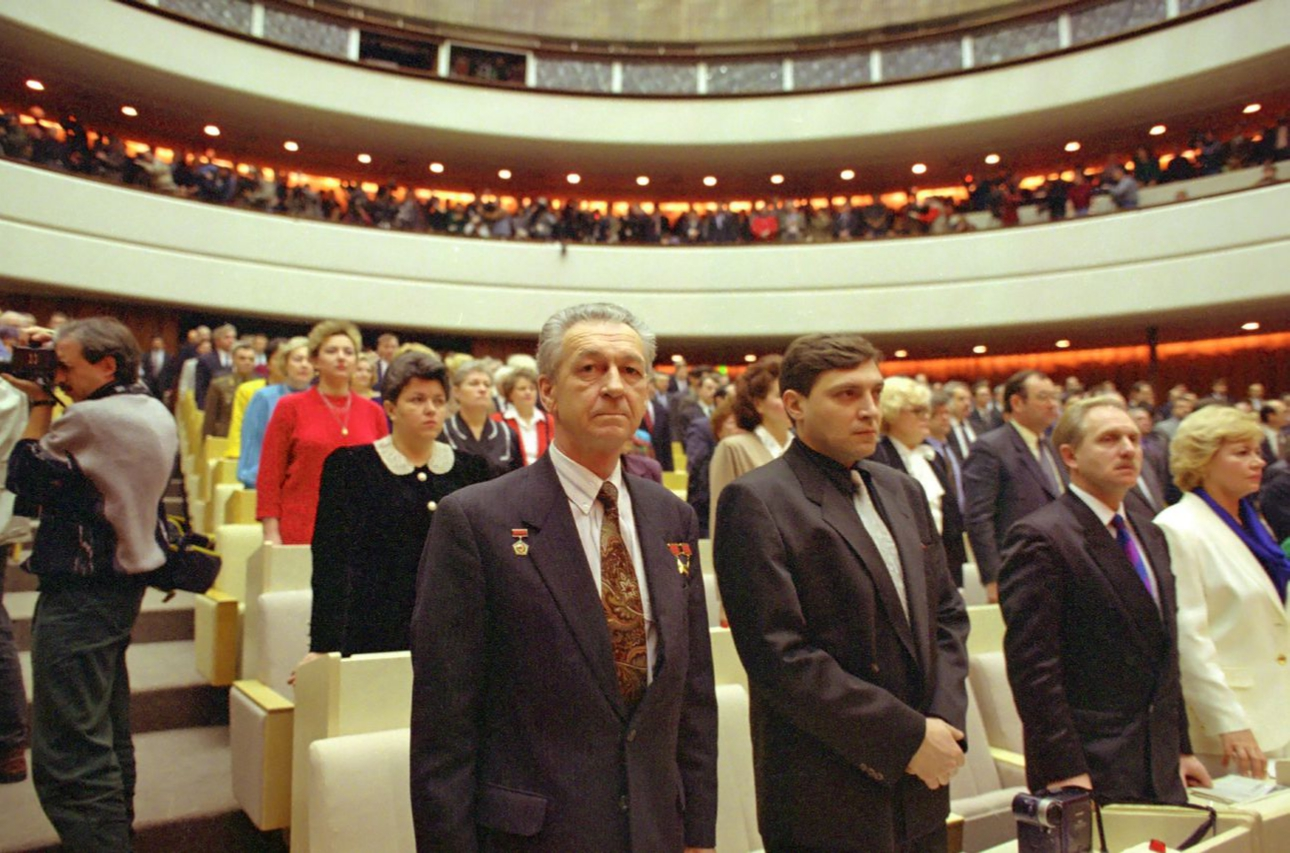
Opening of the 1st State Duma of the Russian Federation

The results of the election proved to be disappointing for the government: the two competing pro-government parties, Russia's Choice and the Party of Russian Unity and Accord, gained 15.5% and 6.7% of the vote respectively and won 123 of the 450 seats in the State Duma. Neither party was able to control the parliamentary agenda nor impose the will of the president on the Duma. Lacking legislative success, both parties rapidly lost membership.

Deputies elected for single-member constituency seats not already affiliated to a political party or bloc were able to affiliate or associate themselves with such. Some of these deputies chose to informally associate themselves with multiple.

The new Duma ratified the Yeltsin Constitution. The new constituiton produced a strong Presidency, particularly over the Duma as it confirmed the ability for the president to dissolve parliament, and to pass laws by presidential decree.

=== Parliamentary groups ===
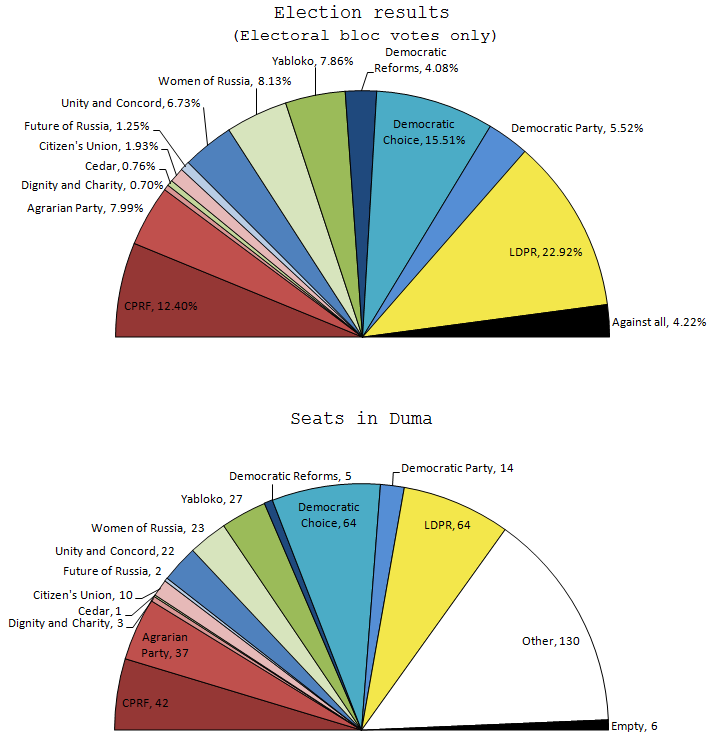

The use of the mixed system for the election of the Duma produced a large number of deputies which were unaffiliated with any electoral bloc. By joining other parliamentary groups or forming groups of independent deputies, they could significantly influence the balance of power in the Duma. Hence, the parliamentary groups in the first two-year term of the Duma showed lack of stability and its numbers may be given only with approximation.

Parliamentary group	Leader	Seats
Liberal Democratic Party of Russia	Vladimir Zhirinovsky	53–64
Russia's Choice	Yegor Gaidar	47–78
Communist Party of the Russian Federation	Gennady Zyuganov	45–47
Women of Russia	Yekaterina Lakhova	20–24
Agrarian Party of Russia	Mikhail Lapshin	50–55
Yabloko	Grigory Yavlinsky	27–28
Party of Russian Unity and Accord	Sergey Shakhray	12–34
Democratic Party of Russia	Nikolay Travkin	8–15
Liberal Democratic Union of 12 December	Irina Khakamada	11–38
New Regional Politics – Duma-96	Vladimir Medvedev	30–67
Russia	Igor Shichanin	34–38
Stability	Aleksey Leushkin	34–40
Russian Way (unregistered)	Sergei Baburin	11–14
Strong State (Derzhava) (unregistered)	Viktor Kobelev	4–5

== See also ==
- Elections in Russia
- List of members of the 1st Russian State Duma
- Viktor Chernomyrdin's First Cabinet
- 1991 Russian presidential election
- 1996 Russian presidential election

== Sources ==
- Nohlen, Dieter; Stöver, Philip (2010). Elections in Europe: A data handbook. ISBN 978-3-8329-5609-7.
- Remington, Thomas F.; Smith, Steven S. (1996). "Political Goals, Institutional Context, and the Choice of an Electoral System: The Russian Parliamentary Election Law". American Journal of Political Science. 40 (4): 1253–1279. doi:10.2307/2111750. ISSN 0092-5853. JSTOR 2111750.
- Remington, Thomas F.; Smith, Steven S. (November 1995). "The Development of Parliamentary Parties in Russia". Legislative Studies Quarterly. 20 (4): 457–489. doi:10.2307/440189. JSTOR 440189.
