= Alevtina Fedulova =

Russian politician and women's activist (1940–2026)

- Алевтина Федулова
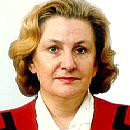
- Fedulova in 1993

Deputy Chairman of the State Duma
- In office 11 January 1994 – 17 December 1995
- Chairman: Ivan Rybkin

Member of the 28th CPSU Central Committee
- In office 1990–1991

Secretary of the Komsomol Central Committee — Chairman of the Young Pioneers Central Council
- In office 20 December 1971 – 18 May 1984
- Preceded by: Tamara Kutsenko
- Succeeded by: Lyudmila Shvetsova

Personal details
- Born: Alevtina Vasilyevna Timakova; 14 April 1940 Elektrostal, Moscow Oblast, Russian SFSR, Soviet Union
- Died: 5 February 2026 (aged 85)
- Party: Women of Russia (1993–1998)
- Other political affiliations: CPSU (1968–1991); Fatherland – All Russia (1998–2001)

Alevtina Vasilyevna Fedulova (Russian: Алевтина Васильевна Федулова, 14 April 1940 – 5 February 2026) was a Russian political activist and leader of the Soviet Women's Committee (later the Union of Women of Russia).

== Early life ==
Fedulova was born on 14 April 1940 in Elektrostal, to an illiterate mother and a blacksmith father, who died when she was young. An excellent student, Fedulova wished to become a teacher as a child, but went to a local technical school linked to a local factory. Under pressure, Fedulova's mother paid the tuition to allow her to finish at the school, enabling her to take entrance exams in Moscow for a teacher training institute there.

Fedulova married at age 20, while still studying at the institute, in 1960. Her husband was conscripted to military service around the time their son was born. Upon graduation, she became a teacher of biology and chemistry. She remained as a high school teacher for ten years.

== Political career ==
In 1963, Fedulova joined the Communist Party of the Soviet Union, about which she expressed some ambivalence.

Fedulova later became head of the Pioneers and was the executive secretary of the Soviet Peace Committee. In 1987, she left her position to work for the Soviet Women's Committee full-time, and was elected vice-president of the organisation that same year. From 1981 until 1986, she was a member of the CPSU's Auditing Commission, and was promoted to the Central Committee in 1990.

After the dissolution of the Soviet Union, Fedulova's position of power within the CPSU made many feminists sceptical. However, as leader of the Women of Russia bloc in 1993, but not affiliated with any political party in particular, she became a member of the Duma. This resulted in 8% of the Duma belonging to the Women of Russia bloc, allowing them to form their own official faction within the Russian government.

== Personal life and death ==
Fedulova was married to a former deputy sports minister, and had one son and two grandchildren.

Fedulova's death at the age of 85 was announced on 5 February 2026.
