= Union of Women of Russia =

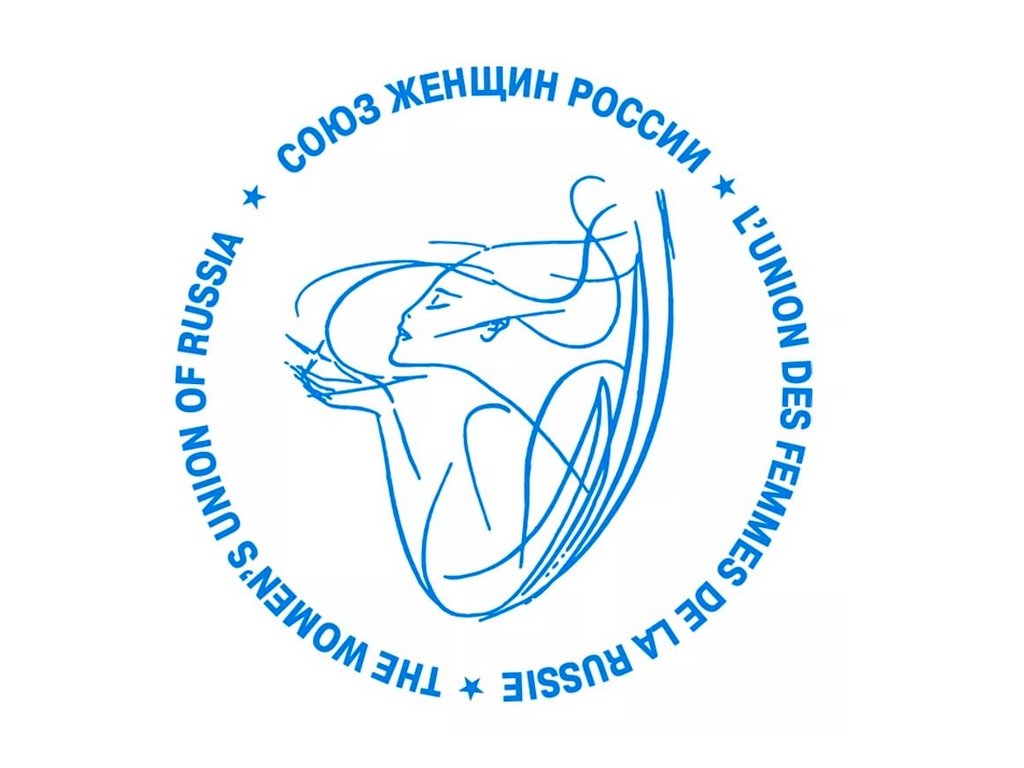
- Leader: Ekaterina Lakhova
- Founded: 1991
- Ideology: Feminism

Website
- wuor.ru

Union of Women of Russia (Russian: Союз женщин России) is an all-Russian public-state organization. Established in November 1990, it became the legal successor to the Committee of Soviet Women in 1992. In 2018, the Union of Women of Russia was granted the status of a public-state organization. By order of the Government of Russia, the Bureau of the Union of Women of Russia includes representatives from the Ministry of Labour and Social Protection, the Ministry of Education, the Ministry of Health, and the Ministry of Culture of the Russian Federation. The Union of Women of Russia carries out its activities through regional branches—present in 89 constituent entities of the Russian Federation—as well as through women’s councils (zhensovety) that operate at the local level. The Union of Women of Russia includes 68 public organizations as collective members. The union was led from 1991 to 2006 by Alevtina Fedulova and from 2006 on by Ekaterina Lakhova.

== History ==
On November 22, 1990, the founding conference of the Union of Women of Russia took place, bringing together women’s councils and various other women’s organizations based within the Russian Federation. The meeting was attended by 424 delegates, including Boris Yeltsin, Chairman of the Supreme Soviet of the RSFSR; Ekaterina Lakhova, Chair of the Supreme Soviet of the RSFSR Committee on Women, Family Protection, Motherhood, and Childhood; Inga Grebesheva, Chair of the Committee on Family Affairs and Demographic Policy under the Council of Ministers of the RSFSR; and others. That same year, the Union of Women of Russia became part of the Committee of Soviet Women.

On January 30, 1992, an extraordinary conference of authorized representatives of the Committee of Soviet Women was held, titled "On the Transfer of Succession Rights by the Committee of Soviet Women," during which the authority of the Committee of Soviet Women was transferred to the Union of Women of Russia. A. V. Fedulova was elected Chair of the Union of Women of Russia, and G. N. Galkina was appointed Deputy Chair.

Between 1992 and 1993, the Union of Women of Russia, in collaboration with the Moscow Government’s Department of Labor and Employment, organized 10 job fairs for blue-collar professions in Moscow, which were attended by over 15,000 women. By 1997, such job fairs were being held across Russia, drawing more than 400,000 attendees, one-third of whom were women.

Beginning in 1993, the Union of Women of Russia, in partnership with the magazine Mir Zhenshchiny ("World of Woman"), spearheaded an initiative to establish an All-Russian Mother's Day—a holiday that was already being observed in certain regions of the Russian Federation. In 1998, the holiday was granted official status nationwide.

In 1993, it was the dominant force in the merger of the Association of Women Entrepreneurs and the Union of Navy Women to form the Women of Russia political bloc for the upcoming 1993 parliamentary election. In 1995, the leadership of the Union of Women of Russia, as part of the official delegation of the Russian Federation, participated in the UN’s Fourth World Conference on Women, which resulted in the adoption of the Beijing Platform for Action.

In 1999, the Union of Women of Russia was granted consultative status with the UN Economic and Social Council.

In 2006, the Plenum of the Union of Women of Russia elected Ekaterina Lakhova—who headed the State Duma Committee on Women, Family, and Youth Affairs—as the organization’s chairwoman.

Representatives of the Union of Women of Russia took part in the All-Russia People’s Front (ONF) primaries for the 2011 State Duma elections.

On March 8, 2017, the Union of Women of Russia participated in the development of a strategy by the Ministry of Labor and Social Protection regarding the advancement of women’s interests. Lakhova became a member of the Coordination Council for the implementation of the National Strategy of Action for Women.

In 2018, the Union of Women of Russia was granted the status of a public-state organization.

== Activity ==
The activities of the Union of Women of Russia are carried out within the framework of a long-term program titled "Equality. Development. Peace in the 21st Century," which encompasses seven key areas: "A Strong Family – A Stable State," "Ensuring Sustainable Development and Social Security," "Guaranteeing Equal Rights and Opportunities for Men and Women," "Spirituality, Culture, and a Healthy Lifestyle," "Women for the Revival of Rural Areas," "Best Practices, New Ideas, and Positive Actions," and "Promoting Peace, International Cooperation, and Friendship".

The Union collaborates with public associations and movements that advocate for democratic reforms in the country and defend the interests of women, as well as with legislative and executive government bodies and local self-government authorities.

The objectives of the Union of Women of Russia include:

- Organizing patriotic initiatives;
- Promoting the values of family life;
- Fostering the physical and moral well-being of children;
- Advocating for women's rights.
