= Women of Russia =

Former political bloc in Russia

Women of Russia Женщины России
- Leader: Alevtina Fedulova
- Founded: 1993
- Dissolved: 1999
- Ideology: Feminism

Women of Russia (Russian: Женщины России, romanized: Zhenshchiny Rossii, abbreviated ZhR) was a political bloc in Russia.

== History ==
The party was established in the autumn of 1993 by merger of three women's groups, the Union of Women of Russia (the dominant force), the Association of Russia's Women Entrepreneurs and the Union of Women of the Navy led by Marina Dobrovolskaya. The Union of Women of Russia had looked at the manifestos of 30 parties due to contest the December 1993 parliamentary elections and was unhappy about the lack of attention to women's issues. After writing to the parties and only receiving three, superficial responses, and amid concerns that the party lists contained few women, the decision was taken to form the party.

In the elections the party surprisingly received 8.1% of the proportional representation vote, the fourth-highest share, and won 23 of the 450 seats in the State Duma.

In the 1995 elections the party was expected to pass the 5% electoral threshold, but received 4.6% of the vote, failing to win any of the proportional seats, and only winning three seats. In 1996 the party split when its co-founder, Ekaterina Lakhova, left the party to form the All-Russian Socio-Political Movement of Women of Russia, whose name was often intentionally shortened to "Women of Russia" to attempt to lure away support.

In April 1999 it was announced that the ZhR would not run in the December 1999 elections, instead becoming part of the Fatherland – All Russia bloc, which Lakhova had also joined. However, the party withdrew from the bloc in September in protest at the lack of women on the party's list to contest the elections independently. However, its vote share fell again to 1.3%, and it lost all three seats. It did not contest any subsequent elections.

The party is today known as the Women's Union of Russia.

== Election results ==
Election	Leader	Votes	%	Seats	+/–	Rank	Status
1993	Alevtina Fedulova	4,679,296	4.39	23 / 450	New	4th	Opposition
1995	Alevtina Fedulova	3,900,885	2.88	3 / 450	▼20	5th	Opposition
1999	Alevtina Fedulova	1,696,434	1.30	0 / 450	▼3	16th	Extra-parliamentary
