= Zoya Pukhova =

Soviet-Russian Politician (1936-2016)

Zoya Pavlovna Pukhova (Russian: Зо́я Па́вловна Пу́хова; 24 September 1936 in Seleznyovo village, Komsomolsky District – 6 January 2016 in Moscow) was a Soviet and Russian politician.

She was a member of the Presidium of the Supreme Soviet, making her a member of the Collective Head of State, in 1966-1989.
