= Ekaterina Lakhova =

Russian politician (born 1948)

- Екатерина Лахова
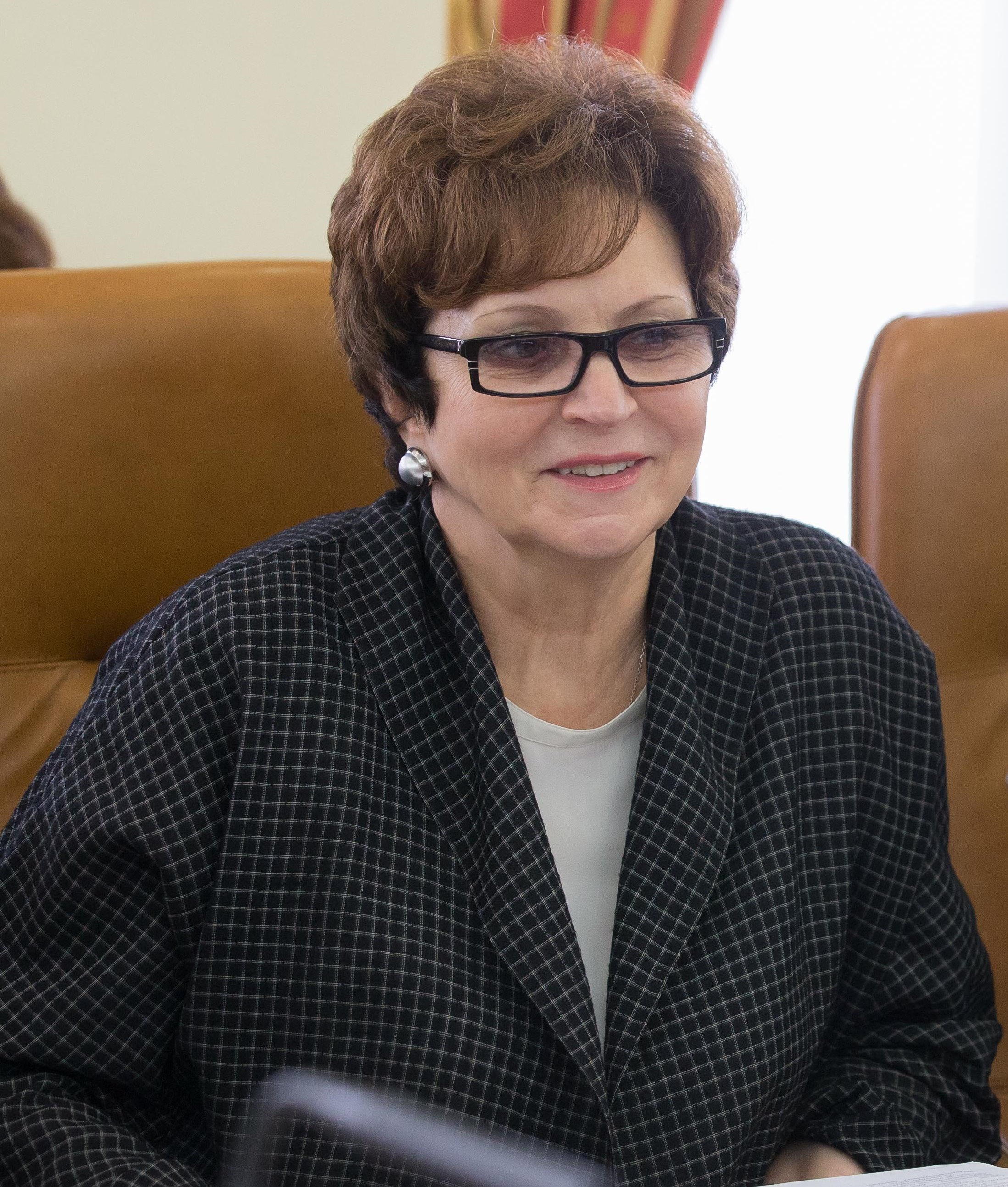
- Lakhova in 2016

Senator from Bryansk Oblast
- In office 30 September 2014 – 27 September 2019
- Preceded by: Alexander Petrov
- Succeeded by: Galina Solodun

Personal details
- Born: Galina Solodun; 26 May 1948 (age 78) Yekaterinburg, Sverdlovsk Oblast, Russian Soviet Federative Socialist Republic, Soviet Union
- Party: United Russia
- Education: Ural State Medical University

Ekaterina Filippovna Lakhova (Russian: Екатери́на Фили́пповна Ла́хова; born May 26, 1948) is a Russian politician and statesman who served as a deputy of the State Duma of the 6th convocation from the United Russia party, and as the deputy chairman of committee of the State Duma for public associations and religious organizations. Member of the General Council of the party United Russia. She was a people's deputy of the RSFSR, a deputy of the State Duma of the I-V convocations. Chairman of the Union of Women of Russia. Currently a member of the Federation Council, a representative of the legislative (representative) body of state power of the Bryansk Oblast, a member of the Committee of the Federation Council on federal structure, regional policy, local self-government and affairs of the North.

Lakhova is one of the main supporters of the introduction of juvenile justice in Russia. She is one of the authors of the Dima Yakovlev Law.

== Controversies ==
In 2006, Lakhova organized a photo shoot for women deputies in honor of the 100th anniversary of the State Duma. Later, it was revealed that Lakhova sold the photos to a furniture factory, which used them to publish a booklet advertising its sofas. Eleven deputies, including Alexandra Burataeva, Nina Ostanina, and Lyubov Sliska sued the factory for violation of personal non-property rights and infliction of moral damage. Lakhova did not join the suit.

Lakhova was also criticized by the Orthodox media for her support of abortions. Some media occasionally accused her of lobbying laws that would force women to be sterilized.

In November 2018, the media widely criticised Lakhova's comment on the increase of the consumer price index. In her comment, Lakhova said that eating buckwheat all day could be beneficial for health and that proposing an increase of the consumer basket was populism.

== Personal life ==
Lakhova is married, she has a son.

In 2018, Lakhova declared an income of 5,839 million rubles.

== See also ==
- All-Russian Sociopolitical Movement of Women of Russia
