= Red Love =

Red Love may refer to

- Red Love (1921 film), an Italian silent film
- Red Love (novel), a Russian novel
  - Red Love (1982 film), a German film adaptation
- Red Love (1925 film), an American silent film
- Red Love (1952 film), an Italian drama film
- Redlove apples Apple cultivar

== See also ==
- Laal Ishq (disambiguation)
