= Yaroslavl electoral district =

Constituency of the Russian Republic

Yaroslavl
- Former Civilian constituency for the All-Russian Constituent Assembly
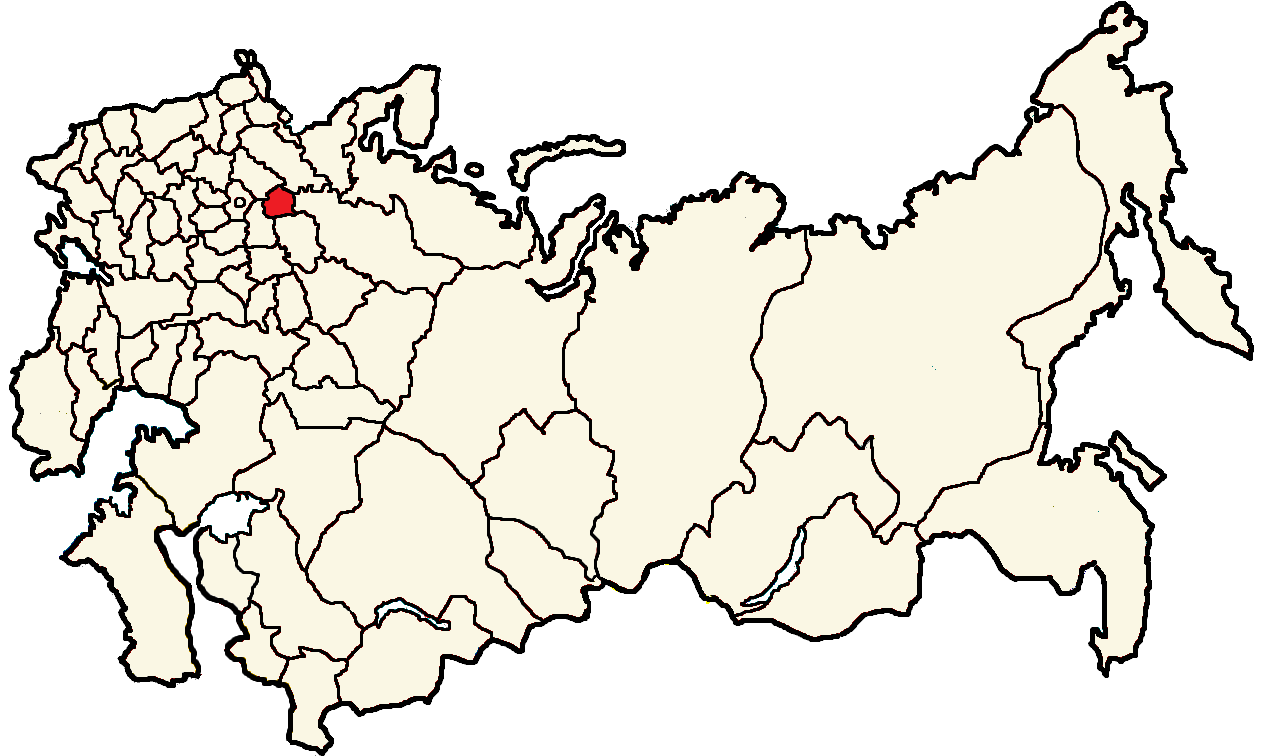

Former constituency
- Created: 1917
- Abolished: 1918
- Number of members: 6
- Number of Uyezd Electoral Commissions: 10
- Number of Urban Electoral Commissions: 2
- Number of Parishes: 166

The Yaroslavl electoral district (Russian: Ярославский избирательный округ) was a constituency created for the 1917 Russian Constituent Assembly election. The electoral district covered the Yaroslavl Governorate.

In Yaroslavl town the Bolsheviks obtained 13,974 votes, Kadets 7,268 votes, SRs 3,303 and Mensheviks 2,853.

== Results ==
Yaroslavl
Party	Vote	%	Seats
List 3 - Socialist-Revolutionaries and Governorate Soviet of Peasants Deputies	197,465	43.06	3
List 7 - Bolsheviks	176,035	38.39	2
List 2 - Kadets	53,730	11.72	1
List 4 - Mensheviks	16,809	3.67	
List 1 - Popular Socialists	5,637	1.23	
List 5 - Union of Landowners	4,497	0.98	
List 6 - Bloc of Traders, Industrialists, Artisans and Homeowners	4,421	0.96	
List 8 - ?	?	?	
Total:	458,594		6

Deputies elected
Konovalov	Kadet
Vishniak	SR
Kollontai	Bolshevik
Rykov	Bolshevik
Bolshakov	SR
Kilchevsky	SR
