= Red Love (novel) =

1923 novel by Alexandra Kollontai

Red Love (Russian: Василиса Малыгина, Vasilisa Malygina) is a Russian novel in 1923 by Alexandra Kollontai, a prominent female Bolshevik theoretician. It was translated in 1927 into English and Japanese. The novel asks deep question about the dynamics between Soviet socialism and the romantic life of Bolshevik women. It was adapted into a German film in 1982.

In his book review, Samuel Perry commented that while not "much of a page-turner, but this did not stop Red Love from becoming a bestseller throughout East Asia [the Empire of Japan and Republic of China] and North America, and becoming more than an ubiquitous epithet for a much broader debate throughout the world about the familial, sexual and affective bonds that might - could and should - evolve under the economic alternative to capitalist modernity being put into practice for the first time in the Soviet Union."

In 2015, a compilation of scholar articles was published under the name Red Love Across the Pacific: Political and Sexual Revolutions of the Twentieth Century to commemorate the novel.
