= Mark Vishniak =

Russian socialist, journalist and writer

- Марк Вишня́к
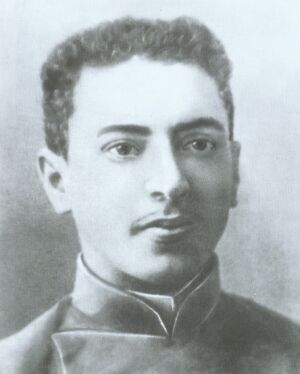
- Vishniak in 1905

Member of the Russian Constituent Assembly
- In office 25 November 1917 – 20 January 1918 (Note: The Constituent Assembly was declared dissolved by the Bolshevik-Left SR Soviet government, rendering the end the term served.)
- Preceded by: Constituency established
- Succeeded by: Constituency abolished
- Constituency: Yaroslavl

Personal details
- Born: Mordukh Vyenyaminovich Vishnyak; January 2, 1883 Moscow
- Died: August 31, 1976 (aged 93) New York City
- Party: Socialist Revolutionary Party
- Education: Imperial Moscow University (1908)
- Occupation: lawyer, publicist

Mark Veniaminovich Vishniak (Russian: Марк Вениами́нович Вишня́к; 1883–1976) was a Russian socialist, lawyer and writer, prominent member of the Socialist Revolutionary Party.

== Early activism ==
M. V. Vishniak was born in Moscow in 1883, the son of a wealthy merchant. He was a childhood friend of the future Socialist-Revolutionary leaders A.R. Gots and I.I. Fondaminsky. As a law student at Moscow University he came in contact with Narodnik circles, but he did not join the Socialist-Revolutionary Party (PSR) until 1905, when he was radicalised by the Revolution of 1905. He was a delegate at the PSR Congress in 1906. Vishniak contributed to several party journals under the pseudonym 'Veniamin Marks'. Under that name he wrote The Legal Status of Jews in Russia, one of the earliest sustained discussions of the condition of Russian Jews. In 1906 he was arrested and deported to Narimski but escaped. Over the next ten years, he was repeatedly arrested, escaped several times and spent time abroad (mainly in France).

== Defencism and Revolution ==
In 1914 he took a Defencist position. After the February Revolution of 1917, he was elected to the All-Russian Congress of Soviets of Peasants' Deputies and to the executive committee of the All-Russian Soviet of Peasants' Deputies. Vishniak belonged to the commission which drafted the proceedings for elections to the Constituent Assembly. He belonged to the Interim Council of the Republic (Pre-Parliament) and was elected to the short-lived Constituent Assembly (which the Bolsheviks suspended after one day).

Vishniak was fiercely opposed to the October Revolution. He participated in anti-Bolshevik activities. In 1918 he moved to Ukraine, where he fell foul of the government of Herman Skoropadski and was arrested. After the Hetman fell, Vishniak was released. In 1919 he emigrated to Western Europe, living mainly in Paris, France, until 1940.

== Exile in Europe ==
M. V. Vishniak.

In France Vishniak was active among Russian exiles and in the Jewish community. He attended the Paris Peace Conference in 1919 as a delegate for the Jewish people and had become a supporter of socialist Zionism. He also belonged to the World Congress of Jewish Minorities. Within the exile community he was close to resolute anti-Bolsheviks like Fondaminsky and even co-operated with P.B. Struve and P.N. Miliukov. In the internecine factional struggles of the PSR, he stood on the right. He contributed to several émigré journals, including Sovremennye zapiski (Contemporary Annals) and the Evreiskaia Tribuna (the Jewish Tribune). From 1937 on he edited Russkie Zapiskii (Russian Notes). When Hitler invaded France, Vishniak escaped to the United States, but he could not persuade his friend Fondaminsky to flee; Fondaminsky was later killed in Auschwitz.

== Exile in America ==
Vishniak himself settled in New York in 1940. He became an American citizen and a respected figure in American journalism and academia: After joining Time magazine in 1946 he later served on the editorial board and worked as its consultant on Russian affairs. He also taught Russian language and literature at Cornell University. One of his students was the historian Richard Pipes. Vishniak wrote prolifically on the history of the Russian Revolution, Bolshevism and Soviet policy, his memoirs, the Jewish community, etc. His memoirs include A Tribute to the Past (1954) and Years of Emigration, 1919-1969.
