= Alexandra Kollontai =

Soviet politician and diplomat (1872–1952)

- Александра Коллонтай
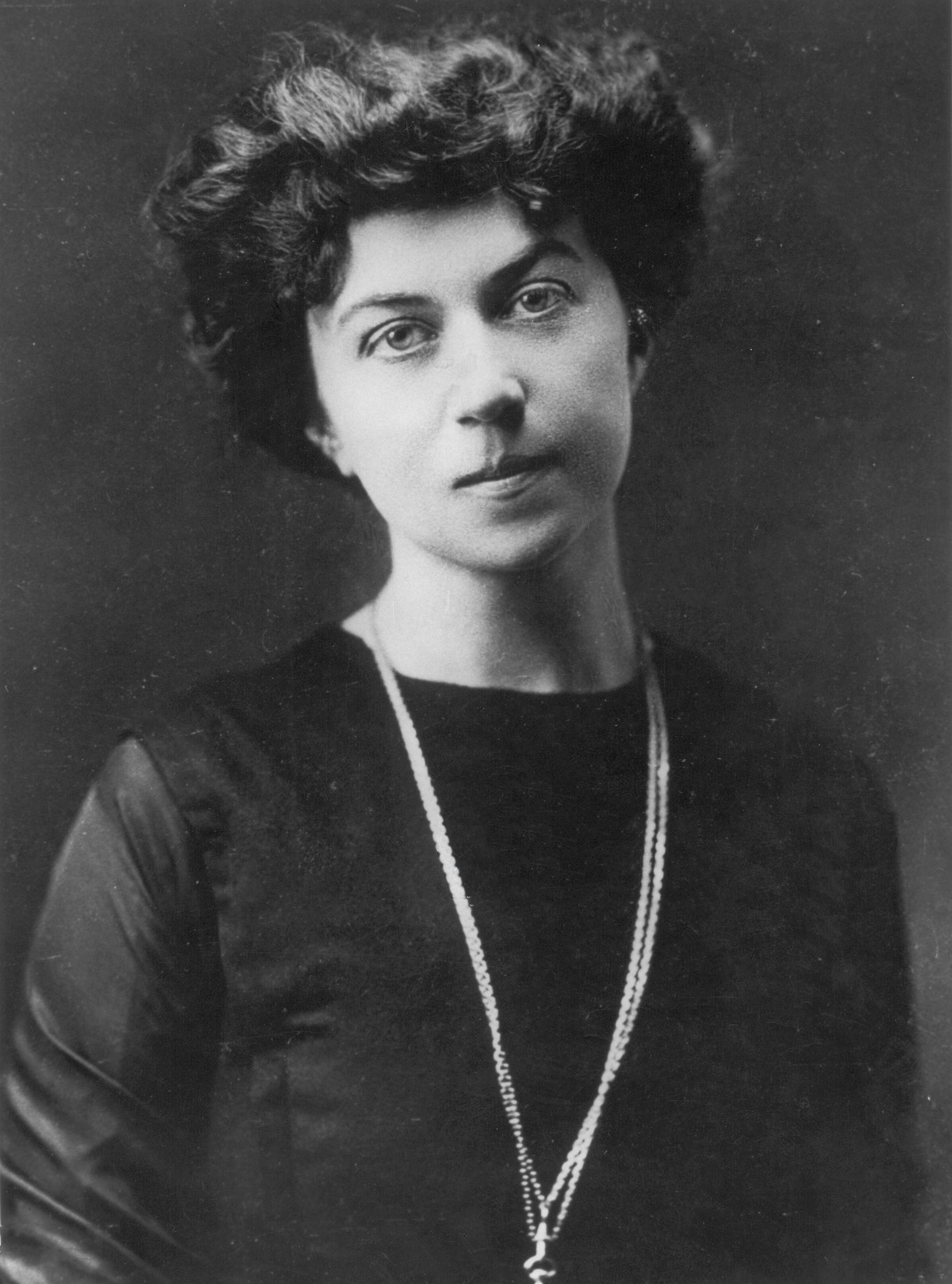
- Kollontai, c. 1900

Soviet Ambassador to Sweden (Note: Titled "Soviet Minister Plenipotentiary to Sweden" until 1943.)
- In office 20 July 1930 – 27 July 1945
- Premier: Alexei Rykov; Vyacheslav Molotov; Joseph Stalin
- Preceded by: Viktor Kopp
- Succeeded by: Ilya Chernyshev

Soviet Minister Plenipotentiary to Mexico
- In office 17 September 1926 – 25 October 1927
- Premier: Alexei Rykov
- Preceded by: Stanisław Pestkowski
- Succeeded by: Alexander Makar

Soviet Minister Plenipotentiary to Norway (Note: Titled "Soviet Chargé d'Affaires to Norway" until 17 August 1924.)
- In office 25 October 1927 – 20 July 1930
- Premier: Alexei Rykov
- Preceded by: Alexander Makar
- Succeeded by: Alexander Bekzadyan
- In office 15 February 1924 – 4 March 1926
- Premier: Alexei Rykov
- Preceded by: Office established (Note: On 15 February 1924, the Soviet Union was recognized de jure by Norway and Kollontai was appointed "chargé d'affaires".)
- Succeeded by: Alexander Makar

People's Commissar of Social Welfare of the Russian SFSR
- In office 11 November 1917 – 23 February 1918
- Premier: Vladimir Lenin
- Preceded by: Office established (Note: Nikolai Kishkin as Minister of State Charities of the Russian Provisional Government.)
- Succeeded by: Alexander Vinokurov

Personal details
- Born: Alexandra Mikhailovna Domontovich; 31 March 1872 Saint Petersburg, Russia
- Died: 9 March 1952 (aged 79) Moscow, Soviet Union
- Resting place: Novodevichy Cemetery, Moscow
- Party: VKP(b)
- Other political affiliations: RSDLP (1899–1906); RSDLP (Mensheviks) (1906–1915); RSDLP (Bolsheviks) (1915–1918); RKP(b) (1918–1925)
- Spouse(s): Vladimir Ludvigovich Kollontai; Pavel Efimovich Dybenko
- Children: Mikhail Vladimirovich Kollontai
- Occupation: Revolutionary; writer; diplomat
- Central institution membership: 1920–1921: Head, Women's Department of the 10th Central Committee of RKP(b); 1917–1918: Full member, 6th Central Committee of RSDLP; Other offices held: 1919: People's Commissar of Propaganda and Agitation, Crimean SSR; 1917–1918: Member of the Russian Constituent Assembly for Yaroslavl

Alexandra Mikhailovna Kollontai (Russian: Александра Михайловна Коллонтай; née Domontovich [Домонтович]; 31 March [O.S. 19 March] 1872 – 9 March 1952) was a Russian revolutionary, politician, diplomat and Marxist theoretician. Serving as People's Commissar for Welfare in Vladimir Lenin's government in 1917–1918, she was a highly prominent woman within the Bolshevik party. She was the first woman in history to be a cabinet minister, and one of the first women to be appointed as a diplomatic representative of a modern state, (Note: Kollontai was preceded in diplomatic service by the First Hungarian Republic minister to Switzerland Rosika Schwimmer (1918), the First Republic of Armenia Honorary Consul to Japan Diana Apcar (1920), and the 'first secretary' of the Bulgarian legation to the United States Nadezhda Stanchova (1921).) and the first to be promoted to the rank of ambassador.

The daughter of an Imperial Russian Army general, Kollontai embraced radical politics in the 1890s and joined the Russian Social Democratic Labour Party (RSDLP) in 1899. During the RSDLP ideological split, she sided with Julius Martov's Mensheviks against Lenin's Bolsheviks. Exiled from Russia in 1908, Kollontai toured Western Europe and the United States and campaigned against participation in the First World War. In 1915, she broke with the Mensheviks and became a member of the Bolsheviks.

Following the 1917 February Revolution which ousted Emperor Nicholas II, Kollontai returned to Russia. She supported Lenin's radical proposals and, as a member of the party's Central Committee, voted for the policy of armed uprising which led to the October Revolution and the fall of Alexander Kerensky's Provisional Government. She was appointed People's Commissar for Social Welfare in the first Soviet government, but soon resigned due to her opposition to the peace treaty of Brest-Litovsk in the ranks of the Left Communists.

In 1919, Kollontai was a leading figure in the foundation of the Zhenotdel, the then-new women's department of the Central Committee that was aimed at improving the status of women in the Soviet Union. She was a champion of women's liberation, and later came to be recognized as a key figure in Marxist feminism.

Kollontai was outspoken against bureaucratic influences over the Communist Party and its undemocratic internal practices. To that end, she sided with the left-wing Workers' Opposition in 1920, but was eventually defeated and sidelined, narrowly avoiding her own expulsion from the party altogether. From 1922 on, she was appointed to various diplomatic posts abroad, serving in Norway, Mexico and Sweden. This period in her life is captured in the writing of fellow Plenipotentiary from Spain, Isabel de Palencia, titled Alexandra Kollontay, Ambassadress from Russia, published in 1947. In 1943, she was promoted to the title of ambassador to Sweden. Kollontai retired from diplomatic service in 1945 and died in Moscow in 1952.

== Biography ==
=== Ancestry ===
Kollontai's father, General Mikhail Alekseyevich Domontovich (Note: Alexandra Kollontai's original family name has been variously transliterated: Domontovits is probably the common alternative spelling.) (1830–1902), descended from a Ukrainian family that traced its ancestry back to the 13th century, to Daumantas (Dovmont), prince of Pskov from 1266 to 1299, later canonized as a saint by the Russian Orthodox Church. Her father served as a cavalry officer in the Russo-Turkish War of 1877–1878. After his participation in the war, he was a member of the Russian staff advising the Bulgarian Constituent Assembly. In May 1879, he was called back to St. Petersburg. He entertained liberal political views, favouring a constitutional monarchy like that of United Kingdom. In the 1880s, he wrote a study of the Russo-Turkish War of 1877–1878. This study was confiscated by tsarist censors, presumably for showing insufficient Russian nationalist zeal.

Alexandra's mother, Alexandra Alexandrovna Masalina (Massalina) (Note: Adding to the Dostoevskian melodrama, the first husband of Alexandra Kollontai's mother, an engineer named Mravinskii, was enlisted by the Tsar's secret police in 1881 to help ferret out a plot to kill the Tsar with dynamite placed under the street in a tunnel. Mravinskii helped police agents check for secret tunnels made by Narodnaia Volia terrorists – who managed to plant dynamite in this manner anyway. Tsar Alexander II was assassinated two weeks later by less sophisticated means when he changed his ordinary route through the streets, but Mravinskii was arrested when the dynamite tunnel was discovered, charged with misleading the police. Alexandra's mother persuaded her second husband to use his influence to aid her first, and as a result Mravinskii was saved from harsh Siberian exile, stripped of his rights and exiled to European Russia instead. Clements, p. 9.) (1848–1899), was the daughter of Alexander Feodorovich Masalin (Massalin) (1809–1859), a Finnish peasant who had made a fortune selling wood. Alexandra Alexandrovna Masalina became known as Alexandra Alexandrovna Masalina-Mravinskaya after her marriage to her first husband, Konstantin Iosipovich Mravinsky (originally spelled Mrovinsky) (1829–1921). Her marriage to Mravinsky was an arranged marriage which turned out to be unhappy, and eventually she divorced Mravinsky in order to marry Mikhail Domontovich, with whom she had fallen in love. Russian opera singer Yevgeniya Mravina (stage name) was Kollontai's half-sister via her mother. The celebrated Soviet-Russian conductor Yevgeny Mravinsky, music director of the Leningrad Philharmonic Orchestra for fifty years (1938–1988), was the only son of Mravina's brother Alexander Kostantinovich and thus Kollontai's half nephew.

=== Early life ===
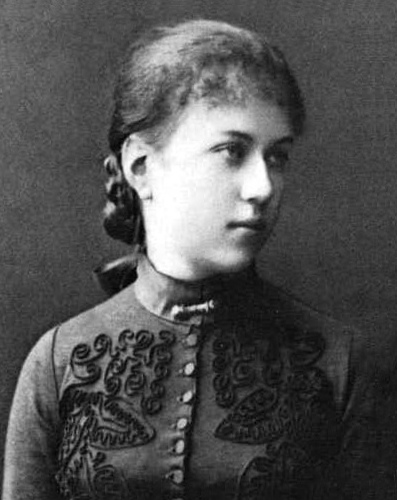
1888 portrait

Alexandra Mikhailovna Domontovich was born on 31 March [O.S. 19 March] 1872 in St. Petersburg. "Shura", as she was called growing up, was close to her father, with whom she shared an analytical bent and an interest in history and politics. Her relationship with her mother, for whom she was named, was more complex. She later recalled:

My mother and the English nanny who reared me were demanding. There was order in everything: to tidy up toys myself, to lay my underwear on a little chair at night, to wash neatly, to study my lessons on time, to treat the servants with respect. Mama demanded this.

Alexandra was a good student growing up, sharing her father's interest in history, and mastering a range of languages. She spoke French with her mother and sisters, English with her nanny, Finnish with the peasants at a family estate inherited from her maternal grandfather in Kuusa (in Muolaa, Grand Duchy of Finland), and was a student of German. Alexandra sought to continue her schooling at a university, but her mother refused her permission, arguing that women had no real need for higher education, and that impressionable youngsters encountered too many dangerous radical ideas at universities. Instead, Alexandra was to be allowed to take an exam to gain certification as a school teacher before making her way into society to find a husband, as was the custom.

In 1890 or 1891, Alexandra, aged around 19, met her cousin and future husband, Vladimir Ludvigovich Kollontai (9 July 1867 – July/August 1917), an engineering student of modest means enrolled at a military institute. Alexandra's mother objected bitterly to the potential union since the young man was so poor, to which her daughter replied that she would work as a teacher to help make ends meet. Her mother bitterly scoffed at the notion:

You work! You, who can't even make up your own bed to look neat and tidy! You, who never picked up a needle! You, who go marching through the house like a princess and never help the servants with their work! You, who are just like your father, going around dreaming and leaving your books on every chair and table in the house!

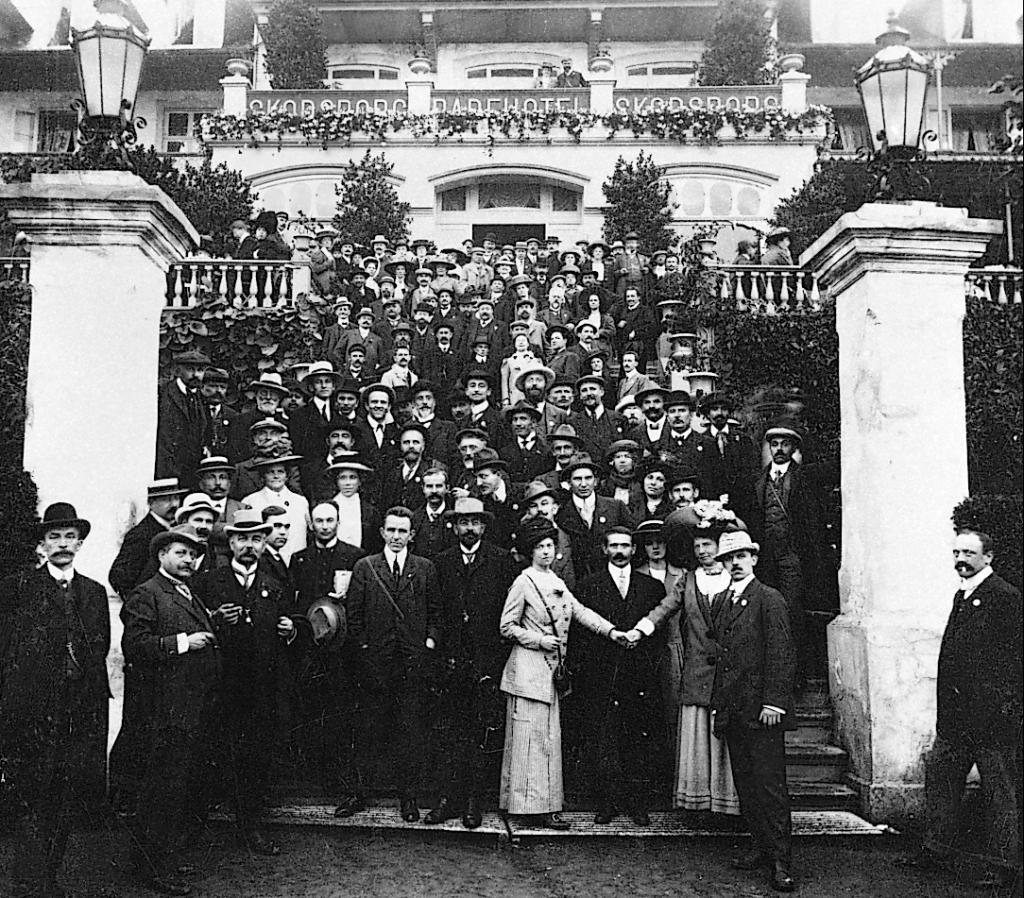
International Socialist Congress, Copenhagen 1910. Alexandra Kollontai holds a delegate's hand.

Her parents forbade the relationship and sent Alexandra on a tour of Western Europe in the hope that she would forget Vladimir, but the pair remained committed to one another despite it all and married in 1893. Alexandra became pregnant soon after her marriage and bore a son, Mikhail, in 1894. She devoted her time to reading radical populist and Marxist political literature and writing fiction.

=== Early political activism ===
While Kollontai was initially drawn to the populist ideas of restructuring society based upon the Mir commune, she soon abandoned this for other revolutionary projects. Marxism, with its emphasis on the class consciousness of factory workers, the revolutionary seizure of power, and the construction of modern industrial society, attracted Kollontai and many of her peers in Russia's radical intelligentsia. Kollontai's first activities were timid and modest, helping out a few hours a week with her sister Zhenia at a library that supported Sunday classes in basic literacy for urban workers, sneaking a few socialist ideas into the lessons. (Note: "The library loaned maps, globes, textbooks, and other materials to groups meeting in various parts of the city and sent out illegal populist and Marxist tracts under the cover of the legal activity." Clements, p. 18.) Through this library Kollontai met Elena Stasova, an activist in the budding Marxist movement in St. Petersburg. Stasova began to use Kollontai as a courier, transporting parcels of illegal writings to unknown individuals, which were delivered upon utterance of a password.

Years later, she wrote about her marriage, "We separated although we were in love because I felt trapped. I was detached, [from Vladimir], because of the revolutionary upsettings rooted in Russia." In 1898 she left little Mikhail with her parents to study economics in Zürich, Switzerland, with Professor Heinrich Herkner. She then paid a visit to England, where she met members of the British socialist movement, including Sidney and Beatrice Webb. She returned to Russia in 1899, at which time she met Vladimir Ilych Ulyanov, better known today as Vladimir Lenin.

Kollontai became interested in Marxist ideas while studying the history of working movements in Zürich, under Herkner, later described by her as a Marxist Revisionist.

She became a member of the Russian Social Democratic Labour Party in 1899 at the age of 27. In 1905, Kollontai was a witness to the series of events in Saint Petersburg, known as Bloody Sunday, where tsarist soldiers opened fire on unarmed demonstrators in front of the Winter Palace causing hundreds of deaths and injuries. At the time of the split in the Russian Social Democratic Labour Party between the Mensheviks under Julius Martov and the Bolsheviks under Vladimir Lenin in 1903, Kollontai did not side with either faction at first, and "offered her services to both factions". In 1906, however, disapproving of "the hostile position taken by the Bolsheviks towards the Duma" and despite her being generally a left-winger, she decided to join the Mensheviks.

She went into exile, to Germany, in 1908 after publishing "Finland and Socialism", which called on the Finnish people to rise up against oppression within the Russian Empire. She traveled across western Europe and became acquainted with Karl Kautsky, Clara Zetkin, Rosa Luxemburg, and Karl Liebknecht, (Note: These "personal friends" were specially mentioned by Kollontai in the first draft of her Autobiography, the renegade Kautsky being however crossed out in the second expurgated version (quotation drawn from Marxists.org).) among others.

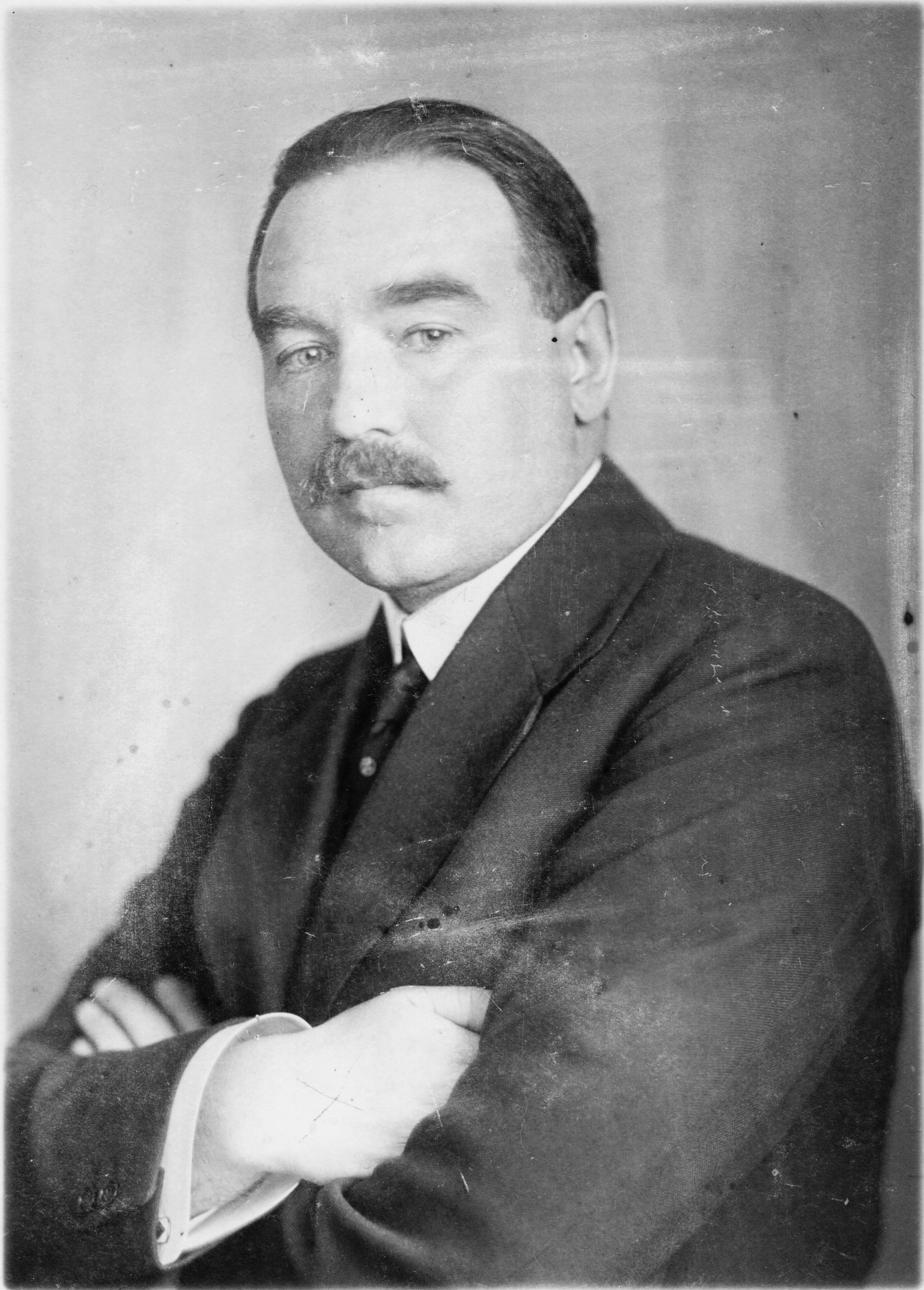
Alexander Shliapnikov, Kollontai's fighting comrade and, for some time, her lover

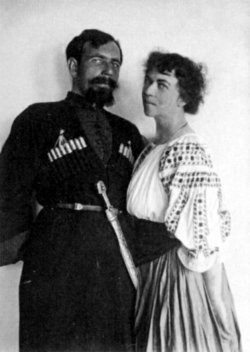
Alexandra and her second husband, Pavel Dybenko

In 1911, while abruptly breaking off her long-term relationship with her faction comrade Peter Maslov (1867–1946), an agrarian scientist, she started a love affair with another fellow exilee, Alexander Gavrilovich Shliapnikov. The couple appeared quite oddly assorted: she was a Menshevik intellectual, of noble origins, thirteen years older than him; he was a self-taught metalworker from provincial Russia and a Bolshevik leading exponent of some prominence. Their romantic relationship came to an end in July 1916, but evolved thereafter into a long-lasting friendship as they wound up sharing many of the same general political views. They were still in contact in the early 1930s when Kollontai lived abroad in a sort of diplomatic exile, and Shliapnikov was going to be executed during the Soviet purges.

With Russian entry into World War I in 1914, Kollontai left Germany due to the German social democrats' support of the war. Kollontai was strongly opposed to the war and very outspoken against it, and in June 1915 she broke with the Mensheviks and officially joined the Bolsheviks, "those who most consistently fought social-patriotism". After leaving Germany, Kollontai traveled to Denmark, only to discover that the Danish social democrats also supported the war. The next place where Kollontai tried to speak and write against the war was Sweden, but the Swedish government imprisoned her for her activities. After her release, Kollontai traveled to Norway, where she at last found a socialist community that was receptive to her ideas. Kollontai stayed primarily in Norway until 1917. She travelled twice to the United States to speak about war and politics, and to renew her relationship with her son Mikhail; in 1916, she had arranged for him to avoid conscription by going to the United States to work on Russian orders from U.S. factories. In 1917, upon hearing of the February Revolution, Kollontai returned from Norway to Russia.

=== Russian Revolution ===
When Lenin returned to Russia in April 1917, Kollontai was the only major leader of the Petrograd Bolsheviks who immediately voiced her full support for his April theses, a set of radical and nonconformist proposals. She was a member of the Executive Committee of the Petrograd Soviet, and "for the rest of 1917, [she] was a constant agitator for revolution in Russia as a speaker, leaflet writer and worker on the Bolshevik women's paper Rabotnitsa". Following the July uprising against the Provisional Government, she was arrested along with many other Bolshevik leaders, but was given again her full freedom of movement in September: she was then a member of the party's Central Committee and as such she voted for the policy of armed uprising that led to the October Revolution. At the Second All-Russian Congress of Soviets on 26 October, she was elected People's Commissar for Social Welfare in the first Soviet government, but she soon resigned in opposition to the Brest-Litovsk Peace. During the revolutionary period, at the age of 45, she married 28-year-old revolutionary sailor Pavel Dybenko, while keeping her surname from her first marriage. (Note: "Bolshevik leaders reacted to the difference in their ages like cackling village gossips," adds Simon Karlinsky ("The Menshivic, Bolshevik, Stalinist feminist". The New York Times, 4 January 1981). Both Dybenko and Shliapnikov were People's Commissars alongside Kollontai in the first Soviet government.)

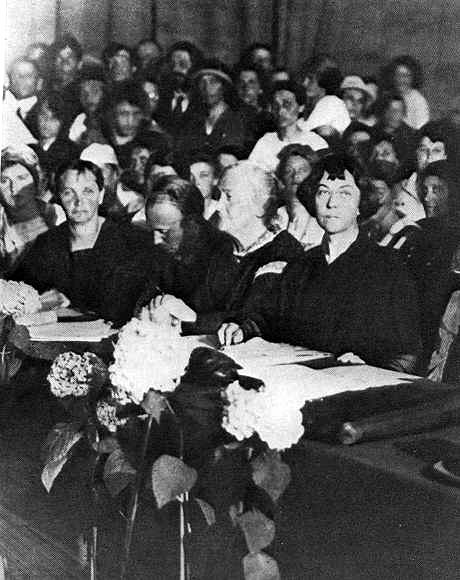
Third Congress of the Communist International (1921). Alexandra Kollontai alongside Clara Zetkin (front row, on her right)

She was the most prominent woman in the Soviet administration and was best known for founding the Zhenotdel or "Women's Department" in 1919 . This organization worked to improve the conditions of women's lives in the Soviet Union, fighting illiteracy and educating women about the new marriage, education, and work laws put in place by the Revolution. It was eventually closed in 1930.

In political life, Kollontai increasingly became an internal critic of the Communist Party and, with an article published in Pravda on 28 January 1921, she publicly sided with the Workers' Opposition, a left-wing faction of the party that had its roots in the trade union milieu and was led by Shliapnikov and by Sergei Medvedev, both of working class extraction. Three days earlier, on 25 January, after about a month delay, Pravda finally published the faction's platform for the upcoming Tenth Party Congress: it mainly advocated unionized workers' control over factories and generally over "the management of the national economy", on the grounds that the construction of a communist society could only be carried out by the industrial proletariat through its class work in history and through the intelligence it would acquire in concrete economic experience. (Note: According to John Simkin, on 27 February trade unionists supporting the Workers' Opposition published a proclamation calling for 'freedom of speech, press and assembly for all who labour', and for the 'liberation of all arrested Socialists and non-partisan workers.' (Alexander Shlyapnikov at Spartacus Educational). However, these positions appear much more in line with those of the Kronstadt insurgents than with the mainstream of the Workers' Opposition.)

In the run-up to the congress, scheduled for 8–16 March, at Shliapnikov's urgent request, Kollontai had a pamphlet printed with the title of The Workers' Opposition: it expounded her personal views on the subjects under discussion, was intended to be distributed only to the delegates and has since remained probably her most famous work. (Note: An English edition of the pamphlet (Solidarity (London) Pamphlet no.7, 1961) is accessible on line at marxist.org).) "Kollontai's propositions for reform mostly repeated those enumerated by the Workers' Opposition, but she placed a greater emphasis on reducing 'bureaucratisation'," and denouncing petty-bourgeois or non-proletarian influences on Soviet institutions and on the party. Her language "conveyed much harsher criticism of the party and CC than did Shlyapnikov's language" in the official faction platform. Lenin was very upset about Kollontai joining the Workers' Opposition and, when he was given a copy of her pamphlet, he just 'leafed through' it and immediately castigated Kollontai. He stated she had written 'the platform of a new party', threatened to submit her pamphlet to the court of the Communist International, and said clearly to her face: "For this you should not only be excluded, but shot as well." (Note: Lenin's wrathful resentment against Kollontai is also shown by another episode reported by Angelica Balabanoff. At the opening session of the congress, on entering the foyer, Lenin saw Kollontai conversing with a French delegate, and immediately rushed over to the latter, blatantly marvelling that he still spoke "to this individual" (Balabanoff, Angelica (1964). Impressions of Lenin. Ann Arbor: University of Michigan Press. pp. 97–98).)

The followers of the faction among the delegates, however, remained quite few and proved to be declining during the proceedings, when Lenin did not even hesitate to draw snickers from delegates by hinting at the amatory past of the Kollontai-Shliapnikov couple. Although Kollontai and her comrades had promptly and unconditionally sided against the Kronstadt rebels, (Note: On 13 March Kollontai boasted before the congress "that it was members of the Workers' Opposition faction who had been 'the first' to volunteer 'for Konstadt' and thus 'to fulfil our duty in the name of Communism and the international workers' revolution'." (Getzler, Israel (2002). Kronstadt 1917-1921. The fate of a Soviet democracy. Cambridge et al.: Cambridge University Press. p. 256. ISBN 0-521-89442-5)) on the last day the congress passed, among others, two secret resolutions: one, specially aimed at the Workers' Opposition, condemned 'Anarcho-syndicalist deviation' within the party; the other ('On party unity') simply banned all factions. Thus, the Workers' Opposition was forcibly dissolved, and Kollontai was practically sidelined.

Nevertheless, despite subsequent misunderstandings with the former leaders of the Workers' Opposition and Kollontai's own resentment at their having renounced the pamphlet she had written to support the faction, on 5 July 1921 she tried again "to help [them] by speaking on their behalf to the Third Congress of the Comintern". In her speech, she bitterly attacked the New Economic Policy proposed by Lenin, warning that it 'threatened to disillusion workers, to strengthen the peasantry and petty bourgeoisie, and to facilitate the rebirth of capitalism'. Trotsky retorted by even likening her to "an Amazon", and Karl Radek loudly corrected: "Like a Valkyrie!"

Kollontai's final political action as an oppositionist within the Communist Party was her co-signing of the so-called "letter of the Twenty Two", whereby several former members of the Workers' Opposition and other party members of working class origin appealed to the Communist International against the undemocratic internal practices in use within the Russian party. When 'Kollontai attempted to speak before the Comintern Executive on 26 February 1922 on behalf of the views expressed in the appeal,' Trotsky and Zinoviev had her name removed from the list of orators and insisted that she should not take the floor. When she 'proved recalcitrant, Trotsky forbade her to speak and issued a decree, in the name of the CC, ordering all members of the Russian delegation to "obey the directives of the party".' Predictably, the appeal of the 22 was unsuccessful. At the Eleventh Party Congress (March–April 1922), Kollontai, Shlyapnikov and Medvedev were charged with having insisted on factional work and a three-man commission, Stalin, Zinoviev and Dzerzhinsky, recommended the "unrepentant" three be purged from the party. In her defensive speech before the Congress, Kollontai emphasized her loyalty to the party and her devotion to giving the leading role in the party and outside it to the working class, she proclaimed her full observance of the previous year's decree on party unity, and concluded: "If there is no place for this in our party, then exclude me. But even outside the ranks of our party, I will live, work and fight for the Communist party." Eventually, a resolution was passed allowing the three to remain in the party unless they committed further violations of its discipline. (Note: However, Flor Anisimovich Mitin (1882–1937) and Nikolai Vladimirovich Kuznetsov (1884–1937), two other signatories of the appeal to the Comintern, who were not "old Bolsheviks", were expelled from the party [Allen (Early dissent), p. 52].)

=== Soviet diplomatic career ===
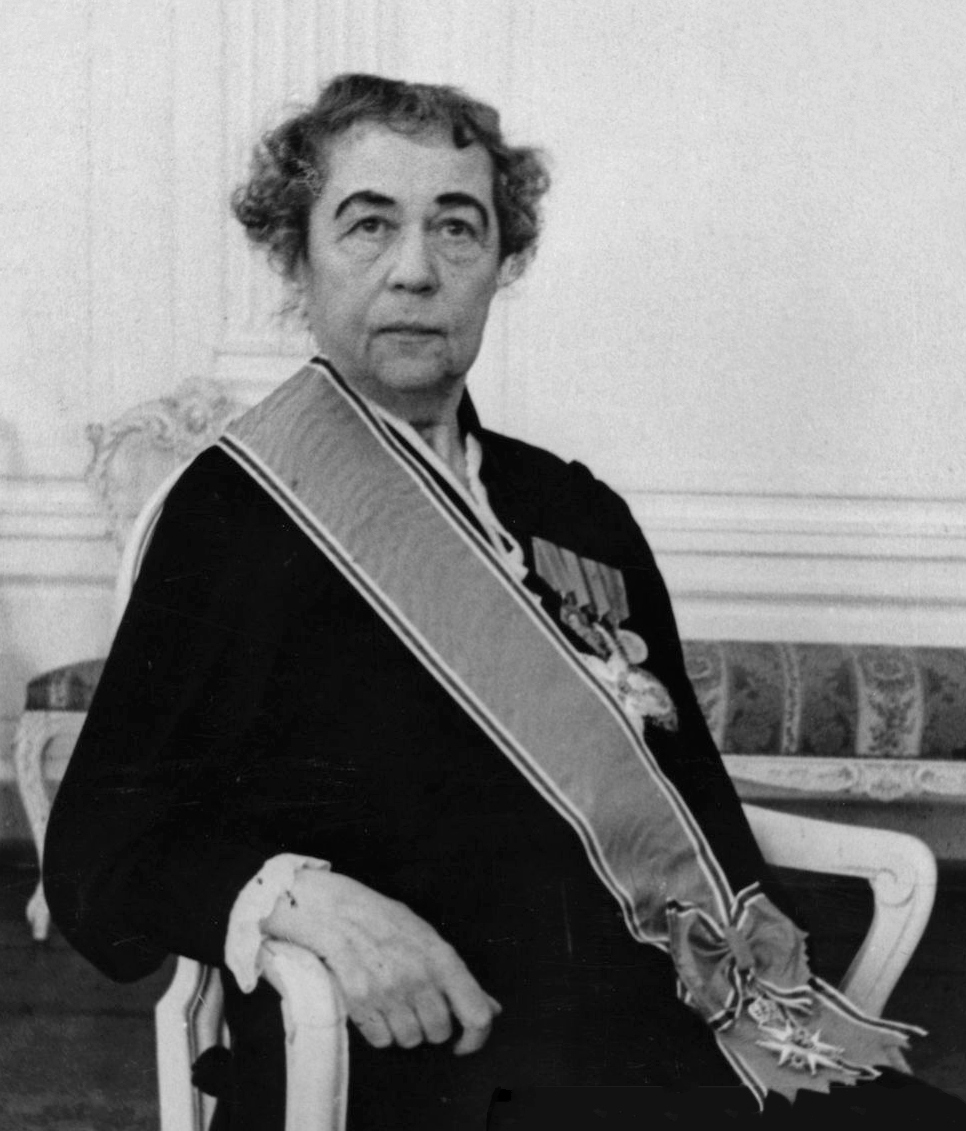
Kollontai after being awarded the Grand Cross of the Order of St. Olav at the Norwegian embassy in 1946

After the Eleventh Congress, Kollontai became a political outcast. She was badly shaken by having teetered dangerously close to expulsion, and regarded the idea of being excluded from the 'revolutionary community of the elect' as a dreadful "nightmare". She even speculated she might be arrested. Italian writer and former communist leader Ignazio Silone later recounted that, on his departure from Moscow in 1922, Kollontai jokingly warned him not to believe any news of her being arrested for stealing Kremlin silverware, for such news could only mean that she was "not entirely in agreement with [Lenin] about some little problem of agricultural or industrial policy."

During this time, Kollontai was also in the process of a painful divorce from her second husband, Pavel Dybenko, which made her want a change of scenery. In the latter half of 1922 she wrote a "personal letter" to the newly appointed General Secretary of the Central Committee and her recent inquisitor, Joseph Stalin, asking to be sent on a mission abroad. Stalin granted her request and, starting from October 1922, she began to be entrusted with diplomatic appointments abroad and was thus prevented from playing any further political role at home. At first she hoped it was just a passing phase in her life and that she would soon return to her political work in the Zhenotdel, but eventually she had to realize that the diplomatic assignment had become a sort of exile.

Initially, she was sent as an attaché to the Soviet commercial mission in Norway, becoming one of the first women serving in diplomacy in modern times. In early 1924, Kollontai was first promoted to Chargé d'affaires and from August to Minister Plenipotentiary. As such, she later served in Mexico (1926–27), again in Norway (1927–30) and eventually in Sweden (1930–45), where she was finally promoted to Ambassador in 1943. She was also a member of the Soviet delegation to the League of Nations. (Note: Kollontai was one of the seventeen women delegates to the League's General Assembly throughout two decades of activity; Glenda Sluga also adds she "was uniquely privy to one meeting of the inner sanctum of the League Council" (Sluga, Glenda (2015): "Women, Feminism and Twentieth-Century Internationalism", in id. and Clavin, Patricia (eds): Internationalisms: A Twentieth-Century History. Cambridge: Cambridge University Press, p. 69, ISBN 978-1-107-64508-0))

When Kollontai was in Stockholm, the Winter War between Russia and Finland broke out; it has been said that it was largely due to her influence that Sweden remained neutral. After the war, she received Vyacheslav Molotov's praises. During late April 1943, Kollontai may have been involved in abortive peace negotiations with Hans Thomsen, her German counterpart in Stockholm. Kollontai was cared for by her friend, Swedish doctor Ada Nilsson as her health began to fail and retired in 1945.

In 1946 and 1947 she was nominated for the Nobel Peace Prize by Scandinavian political circles, including the Finnish president and erstwhile Envoy to Moscow, Juho Kusti Paasikivi, on the grounds of "her diplomatic efforts to end war and hostilities between the Soviet Union and Finland during the negotiations in 1940-44."

=== Political retreat and attitude toward Stalinism ===
Being sent abroad in a sort of de facto exile for over twenty years, Kollontai gave up "her fight for reform and for women, retreating into relative obscurity" and bowing to the new political climate. She discarded her feminist concerns and "offered no objection to the patriarchal legislation of 1926 and the constitution of 1936, which deprived Soviet women of many of the gains they had achieved after the February and October Revolutions". The following words she allegedly pronounced in a private conversation with her friend Marcel Body in 1929 give a suggestion of her attitude towards advancing Stalinism: "Everything's changed so much. What can I do about this? One cannot go against the 'apparatus'. For my part, I have put my principles aside in a corner of my conscience and I pursue as best I can the policies they dictate to me." (Note: These words were reported by Kollontai's erstwhile diplomatic colleague and fighting comrade Marcel Body (1894–1984) in the obituary he published in 1952 in a political magazine ("Mémoires: Alexandra Kollontaï"; Preuves, No. 14, April 1952, pp. 12–24). The article has been reproduced online, albeit with many a copy error, at La Battaille socialiste Website. As they were spoken during a tête-à-tête at Holmenkollen in Norway, the words cannot be confirmed by any third source but appear completely verisimilar.)

Three years earlier, in 1926, when she was requested to write her own autobiography for a series on famous women by Munich publisher Helga Kern, she deemed it necessary to completely revise the first draft of her work she had handed over to the publisher, by deleting practically all references to 'dangerous' topics, as well as the parts mentioning or just hinting at her former critical positions and those having a personal nature that might be regarded as forms of self-celebration. On asking the publisher to make the changes requested, Kollontai apologized with obvious embarrassment, inviting repeatedly to debit her all expenses and writing twice that, under current circumstances, it was not absolutely possible "to do otherwise". (Note: Letter to Helga Kern, 26 July 1926, reproduced in Iring Fetscher's afterword to Kollontai's Autobiographie einer sexuell emanzipierten Kommunistin, Munich, Rogner & Bernhard, 1970 (quoted from the Italian edition, Autobiografia, Milan, Feltrinelli, 1975, p. 67). Fetscher's book presents a collation of both the versions written by Kollontai, the initial draft and the second expurgated one. The two versions are also collated in the English online edition accessible at Marxists Internet Archive.)

In his memoirs, Leon Trotsky was contemptuously critical of Kollontai's political attitude, writing that 'In Russia, Kolontay took from the very first an ultra-left stand, not only toward me but toward Lenin as well. She waged many a battle against the "Lenin-Trotsky" regime, only to bow most movingly later on to the Stalin regime.' Yet, it could also be argued that she had just internalized for good the lesson Trotsky had taught her at the aforementioned 1922 meeting of the Comintern, when he had tamed her last remnants of recalcitrance, forcing her into bowing to party discipline. Kollontai had, as it were, countered in advance, in her 1927 article through which she finally aligned herself, once and for all, with the Stalinists:

The masses do not believe in the opposition. They greet every statement of the opposition with smiles. Is it possible that the opposition thinks the masses' memory is so short? If they come across defects in the party, in the political line, who, if not the famous members of the opposition, established them and built them? It seems that the policy of the party and the structure of the apparatus become unfit only from the day that a group of oppositionists breaks with the party.

— Oppozitsiia i partiinaia massa [The Opposition and the Party Rank and File], "Pravda", 30 October 1927, p. 3

The degree of her adherence to the prevailing ideas of the Stalinist regime, whether it was spontaneous or not, may be gauged from the opening of an article she wrote in 1946 for a Russian magazine. It bore the title The Soviet Woman — a Full and Equal Citizen of Her Country, and praised the Soviet Union's advances of women's rights, while simultaneously emphasizing a view of the role of women in society at odds with her previous writings on women's liberation.

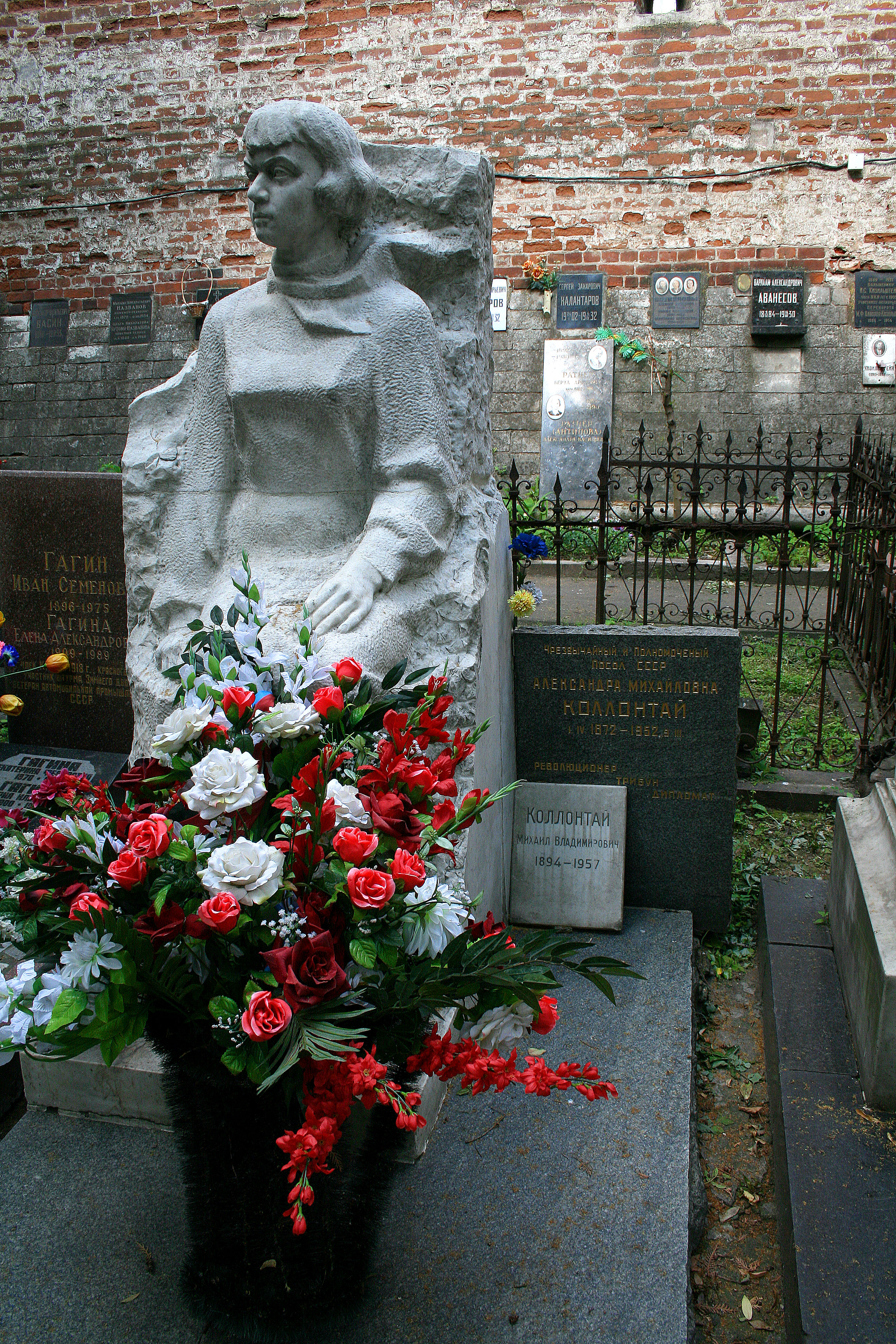
Alexandra Kollontai's tomb at Novodevichy Cemetery

It is a well-known fact that the Soviet Union has achieved exceptional successes in drawing women into the active construction of the state. This generally accepted truth is not disputed even by our enemies. The Soviet woman is a full and equal citizen of her country. In opening up to women access to every sphere of creative activity, our state has simultaneously ensured all the conditions necessary for her to fulfil her natural obligation – that of being a mother bringing up her children and mistress of her home.

— Sovetskaya zhenshchina [Soviet Woman], 5, September–October 1946, pp. 3–4 (Note: An abridged version edited by Sally Ryan (2000) and Chris Clayton (2006) and drawn from Alexandra Kollontai: Selected Articles and Speeches (Moscow, Progress Publishers, 1984) is accessible online at Marxists Internet Archive.)

=== Death and legacy ===
Alexandra Kollontai died in Moscow on 9 March 1952, less than a month from her 80th birthday, and was buried at Novodevichy Cemetery.

She was the only member of the Bolsheviks' Central Committee that had led the October Revolution who managed to live into the 1950s, other than Stalin and his devoted supporter Matvei Muranov. (Note: According to Antonio Moscato, apart from Stalin and Kollontai, there were 19 full members in the Central Committee at the time of the Bolshevik Revolution: two of them were killed by counter-revolutionaries; five, including Lenin, died for other causes before Stalin's accession to power; the 12 members left all fell victims to Stalinist repression, including Trotsky who was assassinated in Mexico [La distruzione del partito bolscevico (a chapter of the essay: Lenin e Trotsky, le ragioni di una collaborazione), in Lenin/Trotsky (2017). Su Marx. L'approccio dei due capi della Rivoluzione russa (in Italian). Goware ebook. ISBN 978-88-6797-883-0]. However, Matvei Muranov too came unharmed through the purges, outliving all his former colleagues until 1959: the exact number of those who fell victims of Stalin must thus be calculated as 11. For the list and dates of death of the full members of the Bolshevik Central Committee elected at the 6th Congress, see: Hirschkowitz, Naftali, ed. (2005–2020). "Comitato Centrale, eletto dal VI Congresso del POSDR(b) 3(16).8.1917, membri". Guida alla storia del Partito Comunista e dell'Unione Sovietica 1898 - 1991 (in Russian and Italian).) She has sometimes been criticized and even held up to contempt for not raising her voice during the Stalinist purges, when, among countless others, her former husband, her former lover and fighting comrade, and so many friends of hers were executed. And, it has been noted, at the time she "was safe in her sumptuous Stockholm residence". Notwithstanding, it should also be pointed out that, even so, Kollontai did not enjoy a full liberty of action and had to worry about the possible fates of her family. It might not have been pure chance if both her only son (Note: 'Misha' Kollontai managed to live most of his life in the United States where he worked as an engineer; meanwhile his mother raised her grandson Vladimir Mikhailovich in Sweden (Clements, p. 251). Misha, however, died during the Second World War, probably in Stockholm, where he had sought his mother's nursing because he had fallen ill with heart disease (Clements, pp. 265 e 270).) and her musician half-nephew (Note: Another of Kollontai's half-nephews (the son of her eldest half-sister Adèle and also her own cousin), who was an out-and-out Bolshevik from 1917, committed suicide in 1931. "They overdid vigilance," bitterly wrote Kollontai in her diary, as she prepared, "trembling", to tell her half-sister the terrible news (Farnsworth [2010], p. 960). Farnsworth does not mention the suicide's name, but, according to the Russian Wikipedia, the name of the only male child of Adèle (Аглаиде) and Konstantin Alekseevich Domontovich was Mikhail, the same as Kollontai's.) (whom she had much supported at the beginning of his career) also came unscathed through the persecution of the Stalinist regime, to the establishment of which she had, however, significantly contributed. (Note: On the other hand, Kollontai is rather unlikely to have ever been so quiet and safe during the Terror. Jenny Morrison writes that "she lived the last 20 years of her life in constant fear of assassination or imprisonment". Barbara Allen learnt from Kollontai's grandson of a family tradition (based on secondhand information) to the effect that Kollontai had once been on the very verge of arrest. During a visit of hers in Moscow, an order had already been issued for her arrest, but, "before [it] could be implemented, the NKVD official responsible was arrested. Kollontai left Moscow for Scandinavia before a new official could be assigned to the case" and it was later closed somehow or other. According to Allen, moreover, neither Kollontai nor Shliapnikov (nor even other major exponents of the Workers' Opposition) would ever betray close friends during the Terror. On the contrary, "Kollontai tried as well as she could to help her friends, appealing to Molotov and others, but with fewer and fewer results". Which eventually drove her to seek comfort even in "nostalgia for quieter and more hopeful prerevolutionary times" (A Proletarian From a Novel, p. 190).)

The resurgence of radicalism in the 1960s and the growth of the feminist movement in the 1970s spurred a new interest in the life and writings of Alexandra Kollontai all around the world. A spate of books and pamphlets by and about Kollontai were subsequently published, including full-length biographies by historians Cathy Porter, Beatrice Farnsworth, and Barbara Evans Clements. In 1982 Rosa von Praunheim made the film Red Love based on the novella with the same title by Kollontai; the film was shown in the Museum of Modern Art. Kollontai was the subject of the 1994 TV film, A Wave of Passion: The Life of Alexandra Kollontai, with Glenda Jackson as the voice of Kollontai. A female Soviet diplomat in the 1930s with unconventional views on sexuality, probably inspired by Kollontai, had been played by Greta Garbo in the movie Ninotchka (1939).

== Contributions to Marxist feminism ==
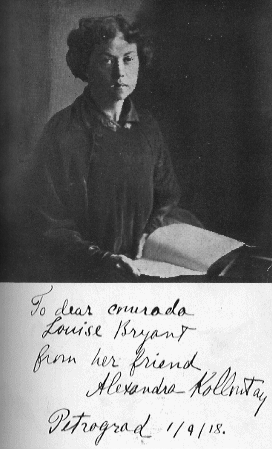
To dear comrade Louise Bryant from her friend Alexandra Kollontay, Petrograd, 1 September 1918.

Kollontai is regarded as a key figure in Marxist feminism for her commitment both to women's liberation and Marxist ideals. She opposed the ideology of liberal feminism, which she saw as bourgeois. At the same time, Kollontai was a champion of women's liberation, believing that it "could take place only as the result of the victory of a new social order and a different economic system". She criticized bourgeois feminists for prioritizing political goals, such as women's suffrage, that would provide political equality for bourgeois women but would do little to address the immediate conditions of working-class women, and was further distrustful that bourgeois champions of feminism would continue to support their working class counterparts after succeeding in their struggle for "general women's" rights:

Class instinct – whatever the feminists say – always shows itself to be more powerful than the noble enthusiasms of "above-class" politics. So long as the bourgeois women and their [proletarian] "younger sisters" are equal in their inequality, the former can, with complete sincerity, make great efforts to defend the general interests of women. But once the barrier is down and the bourgeois women have received access to political activity, the recent defenders of the "rights of all women" become enthusiastic defenders of the privileges of their class, content to leave the younger sisters with no rights at all. Thus, when the feminists talk to working women about the need for a common struggle to realise some "general women's" principle, women of the working class are naturally distrustful.

— Alexandra Kollontai (1909), The Social Basis of the Woman Question

Kollontai is known for her advocacy of free love. However, this does not mean that she advocated casual sexual encounters; indeed, she believed that due to the inequality between men and women that persisted under socialism, such encounters would lead to women being exploited, and being left to raise children alone. Instead she believed that true socialism could not be achieved without a radical change in attitudes to sexuality, so that it might be freed from the oppressive norms that she saw as a continuation of bourgeois ideas about property. A common myth describes her as a proponent of the "glass of water" theory of sexuality. The quote "...the satisfaction of one's sexual desires should be as simple as getting a glass of water" is often mistakenly attributed to her. This is likely a distortion of the moment in her short story "Three Generations" when a young female Komsomol member argues that sex "is as meaningless as drinking a glass of vodka [or water, depending on the translation] to quench one's thirst." In number 18 of her Theses on Communist Morality in the Sphere of Marital Relations, Kollontai argued that "...sexuality is a human instinct as natural as hunger or thirst."

Though Kollontai believed in the eventual obsolescence of the traditional family, she held that the institution of marriage could survive if it underwent a radical transformation. She advocated for a transformed marriage that would be compatible with many other social relations, such as friendship. Kollontai felt that by liberating women and men from their traditionally hierarchical roles, communism would free marriage from the "conjugal slavery of the past", allowing spouses to thrive in egalitarian marriages grounded in mutual love and trust. As Kollontai wrote in 1920:

The workers' state needs new relations between the sexes, just as the narrow and exclusive affection of the mother for her own children must expand until it extends to all the children of the great, proletarian family, the indissoluble marriage based on the servitude of women is replaced by a free union of two equal members of the workers' state who are united by love and mutual respect. In place of the individual and egoistic family, a great universal family of workers will develop, in which all the workers, men and women, will above all be comrades.

— Alexandra Kollontai (1920), Communism and the Family

Kollontai saw domestic labour as an impediment to her ideal of the "universal family". Rather than viewing the tasks that were traditionally reserved for women as productive labour, Kollontai believed that housework stood in the way of industrialization and modernization and that under a fully realized communist society, industrial mechanization would ultimately replace so-called women's work:

All that was formerly produced in the bosom of the family is now being manufactured on a mass scale in workshops and factories. The machine has superseded the wife. What housekeeper would now bother to make candles, spin wool or weave cloth? All these products can be bought in the shop next door. Formerly every girl would learn to knit stockings. Nowadays, what working woman would think of making her own? In the first place she doesn't have the time. Time is money, and no one wants to waste time in an unproductive and useless manner. Few working women would start to pickle cucumbers or make other preserves when all these things can be bought in the shop.

— Alexandra Kollontai (1920), Communism and the Family

In this regard, Kollontai's critique of women's societal position under capitalism is both reminiscent of and distinct from the Marxist feminist Wages for Housework movement. While proponents of Wages for Housework argue that the domestic labour is productive labour worthy of monetary compensation, Kollontai devalued "women's work", believing it to be an antiquated vestige of the past. Unlike supporters of Wages for Housework who advocated for the integration of women into the public sphere, Kollontai questioned the status of working women:

What kind of "family life" can there be if the wife and mother is out at work for at least eight hours and, counting the travelling, is away from home for ten hours a day? Her home is neglected; the children grow up without any maternal care, spending most of the time out on the streets, exposed to all the dangers of this environment. The woman who is wife, mother and worker has to expend every ounce of energy to fulfil these roles. She has to work the same hours as her husband in some factory, printing-house or commercial establishment and then on top of that she has to find the time to attend to her household and look after her children. Capitalism has placed a crushing burden on woman's shoulders: it has made her a wage-worker without having reduced her cares as housekeeper or mother.

— Alexandra Kollontai, Communism and the Family

Kollontai's views on the role of marriage and the family under Communism were arguably more influential than her advocacy of "free love". Kollontai believed that, like the state, the family unit would wither away once the second stage of communism became a reality. She viewed marriage and traditional families as legacies of an oppressive, property-rights-based, and individualistic past in which women were simultaneously subjected to both wage labour outside the home and unpaid maternal and domestic labour within it. Kollontai admonished men and women to discard their nostalgia for traditional family life — "the worker-mother must learn not to differentiate between yours and mine; she must remember that there are only our children, the children of Russia's communist workers." Under Communism, both men and women would work for, and be supported by, society, not their families. Similarly, their children would be wards of society, raised in common. However, she also praised parental attachment: "Communist society will take upon itself all the duties involved in the education of the child, but the joys of parenthood will not be taken away from those who are capable of appreciating them."

== Awards ==
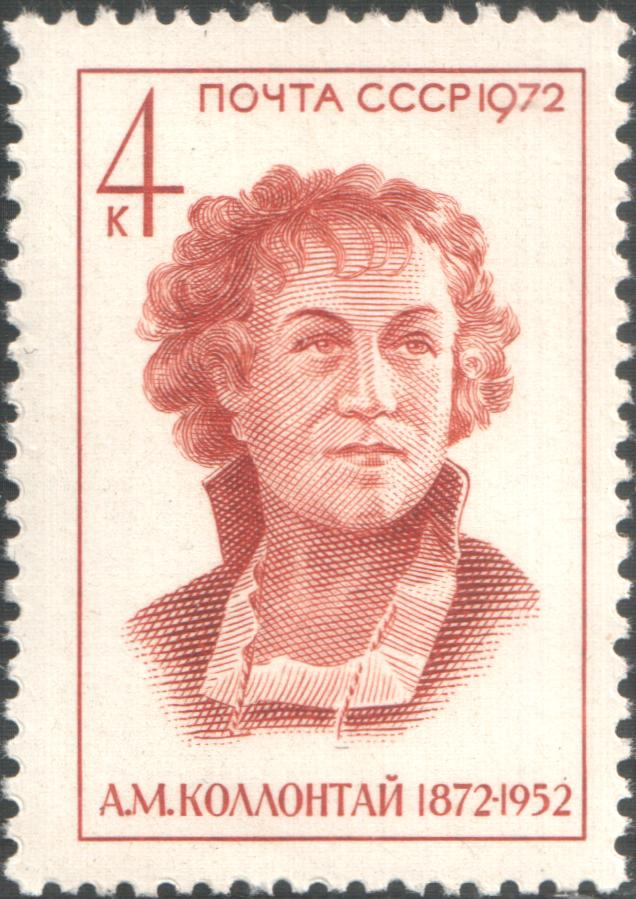
Commemorative stamp issued by the Soviet Union in 1972

- Order of Lenin (1933)
- Order of the Red Banner of Labour (1942)
- Order of the Red Banner of Labour (1945)
- Grand Cross of the Order of St. Olav
- Order of the Aztec Eagle with Sash (1944) (Note: Kollontai was awarded the Order of the Aztec Eagle on the basis of her friendship with Mexican Presidents Lázaro Cárdenas del Río (21 May 1895 – 19 October 1970), who served between 1934 and 1940, and Manuel Ávila Camacho (24 April 1897 – 13 October 1955), who served between 1940 and 1946.)

== Works ==
- The Social Basis of the Woman Question (Социальные основы женского вопроса). Including the introduction written by Kollontai in 1908. St. Petersburg: Znamie, 1909.
- "New Woman" ("Новая женщина"), Modern World (Современный мир), 9, 151–185, 1913 (republished in New morality and working class (Новая мораль и рабочий класс), Moscow, 1919, pp. 3–35).
- "The Attitude of the Russian Socialists", The New Review, March 1916, pp. 60–61.
- Vasilisa Malygina (Василиса Малыгина), novel, 1923

- Red Love [English translation of Vasilisa Malygina, 1923]. New York: Seven Arts, 1927.

- Free Love. London: J.M. Dent and Sons, 1932.
- Communism and the Family. Sydney: D. B. Young, n.d. [1970].
- The Autobiography of a Sexually Emancipated Communist Woman, n.c. [New York]: Herder and Herder, n.d. [1971].
- Sexual Relations and the Class Struggle: Love and the New Morality. Bristol: Falling Wall Press, 1972.
- Women Workers Struggle for their Rights. Bristol: Falling Wall Press, 1973.
- The Workers' Opposition. San Pedro, CA: League for Economic Democracy, 1973.
- International Women's Day. Highland Park, MI: International Socialist Publishing Co., 1974.
- Selected Writings of Alexandra Kollontai. Alix Holt, trans. London: Allison & Busby, 1977. New York: W.W. Norton & Co.
- Love of Worker Bees [novel]. Cathy Porter, trans. London: Virago, 1977 [new translation of Vasilisa Malygina, plus two short stories]
- A Great Love [novel]. Cathy Porter, trans. London: Virago, 1981. Also: New York: W.W. Norton & Co., 1982.
- Selected Articles and Speeches. New York: International Publishers, 1984.
- The Essential Alexandra Kollontai. Chicago: Haymarket Books, 2008.
- The Workers Opposition in the Russian Communist Party: The Fight for Workers Democracy in the Soviet Union. St. Petersburg, FL: Red and Black Publishers, 2009.

A comprehensive bibliography of Russian-language material by Kollontai appears in Clements, pp. 317–331.

== See also ==
- Outline of the Russian Revolution and Civil War
- Bibliography of the Russian Revolution and Civil War
- Bibliography of Stalinism and the Soviet Union
- Index of Old Bolsheviks
- Index of articles related to the Russian Revolution and Civil War
- Zhenotdel
- Kommunistka
- History of feminism
- Women in the Russian Revolution
- Socialist Feminism

== Sources ==
- Allen, Barbara C. (2015). Alexander Shlyapnikov, 1885-1937: Life of an Old Bolshevik. Leiden: Brill. pp. 84–85. ISBN 978-90-04-24853-3.
- Allen, Barbara C. (2007). "Early dissent within the party: Alexander Shliapnikov and the letter of the twenty-two". The NEP Era: Soviet Russia 1921-1928 (PDF). Vol. 1. Archived from the original (PDF) on 5 November 2021.
- Allen, Barbara C. (2008). "'A Proletarian From a Novel': Politics, Identity, and Emotion in the Relationship between Alexander Shliapnikov and Alexandra Kollontai, 1911-1935". The Soviet and Post-Soviet Review. 35 (2): 21–54. Archived from the original on 13 August 2018.
- Clements, Barbara Evans (1979). Bolshevik Feminist: The Life of Aleksandra Kollontai. Bloomington: Indiana University Press. ISBN 0-253-31209-4.
- Cole, G.D.H. (1958). A History of Socialist Thought, volume IV: Communism and Social Democracy 1914-1931. London-New York: Macmillan-St. Martin's Press, parts I and II
- de Haan, Francisca; Daskalova, Krasimira; Loutfi, Anna (2006). A Biographical Dictionary of Women's Movements and Feminisms: Central, Eastern and South Eastern Europe, 19th and 20th Centuries. Central European University Press. ISBN 978-963-7326-39-4.
- Farnsworth, Beatrice (2010). "Conversing with Stalin, Surviving the Terror: The Diaries of Aleksandra Kollontai and the Internal Life of Politics". Slavic Review. 69 (4): 944–970. doi:10.1017/S003767790000992X. S2CID 158044855.
- Holt, Alix (trans.), ed. (1980) [1977]. Alexandra Kollontai Selected Writings. USA: Norton & Company. ISBN 0-393-00974-2.
- Morrison, Jenny, "Women on the left: Alexandra Kollontai"; Counterfire, 11 February 2012
- Ringer, Ronald E. (2006). Excel HSC Modern History. Glebe NSW: Pascal Press (article: "Alexandra Kollontai (1872–1952)", pp. 187–190). ISBN 978-1-74125-246-0
