= Laal Ishq =

Laal Ishq (lit. 'Red Love') may refer to:

- "Laal Ishq" (song), a Hindi song from the 2013 Bollywood film Goliyon Ki Raasleela Ram-Leela
- Laal Ishq (Pakistani TV series), a 2017 Pakistani drama serial
- Laal Ishq (Indian TV series), a 2018 Indian Hindi romantic/horror television series
- Laal Ishq (film), a 2016 Indian Marathi-language romance mystery thriller film

== See also ==
- Red Love (disambiguation)
