= Redlove apples =

Apple cultivar

Redlove apples are a series of cultivars bred by Markus Kobelt in Switzerland. They are hybrids from cross-pollination of red-fleshed and scab-resistant plants. Cultivars include 'Redlove Calypso', 'Redlove Circe', 'Redlove Era', and 'Redlove Odysso'. Some have a high antioxidant content with 30–40% more than an average apple. The fruit are red on the outside and inside, with a white line in the middle. The apples are sold as a protected, trade-marked variety. Licences for commercial production are sold worldwide and can be acquired from Lubera AG.

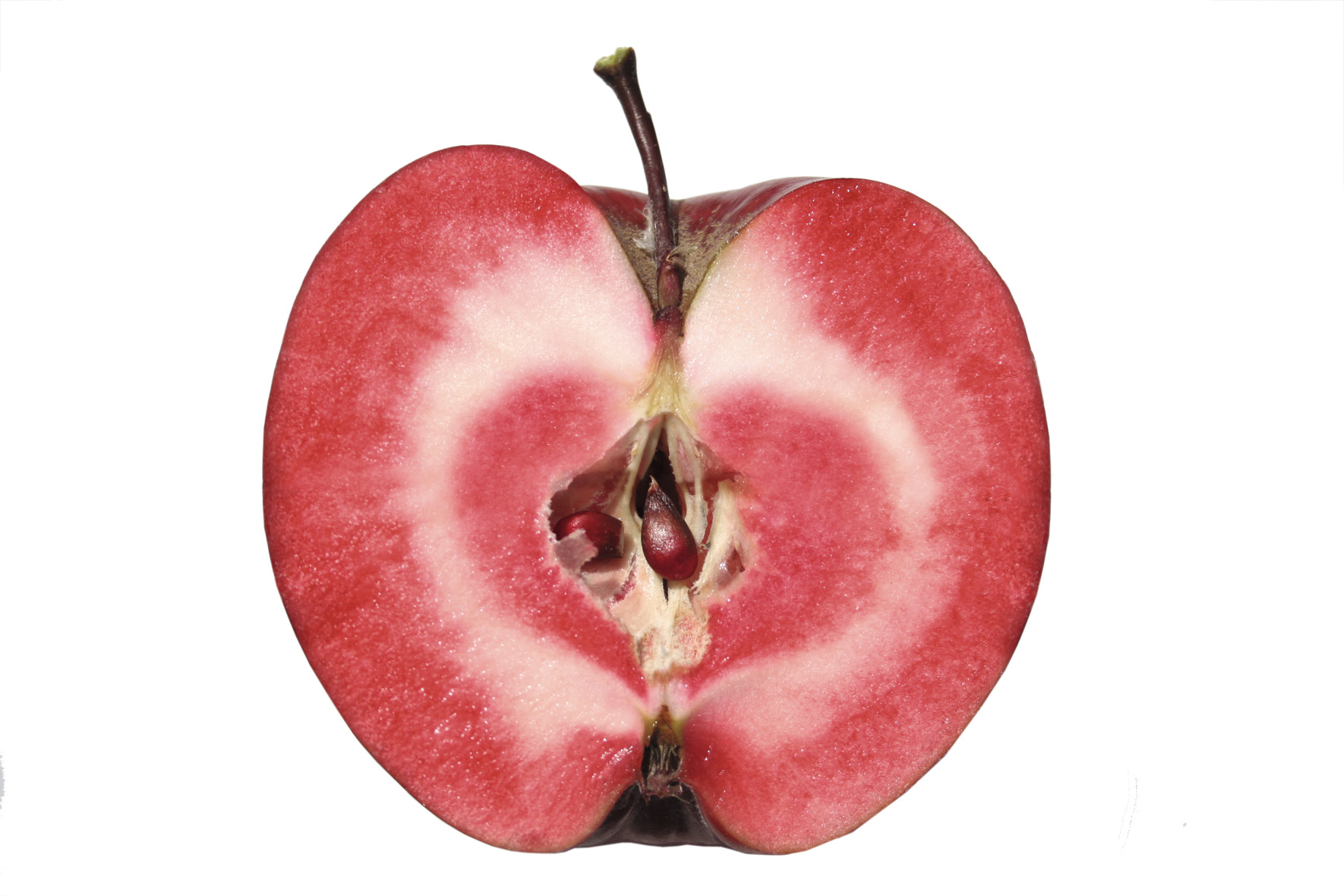
A sliced fruit of a Redlove apple

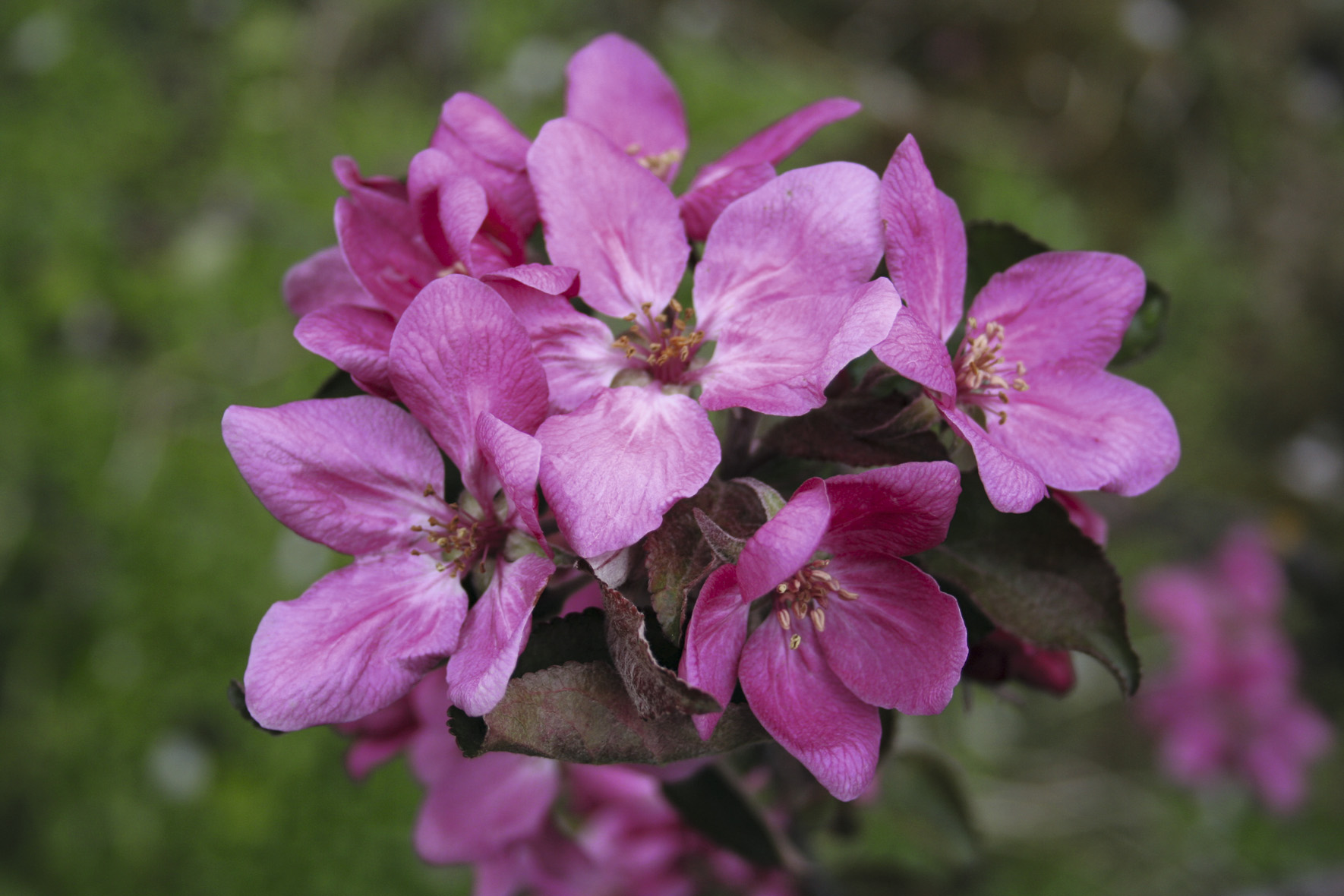
Purple flowers of the 'Redlove Circe' apple

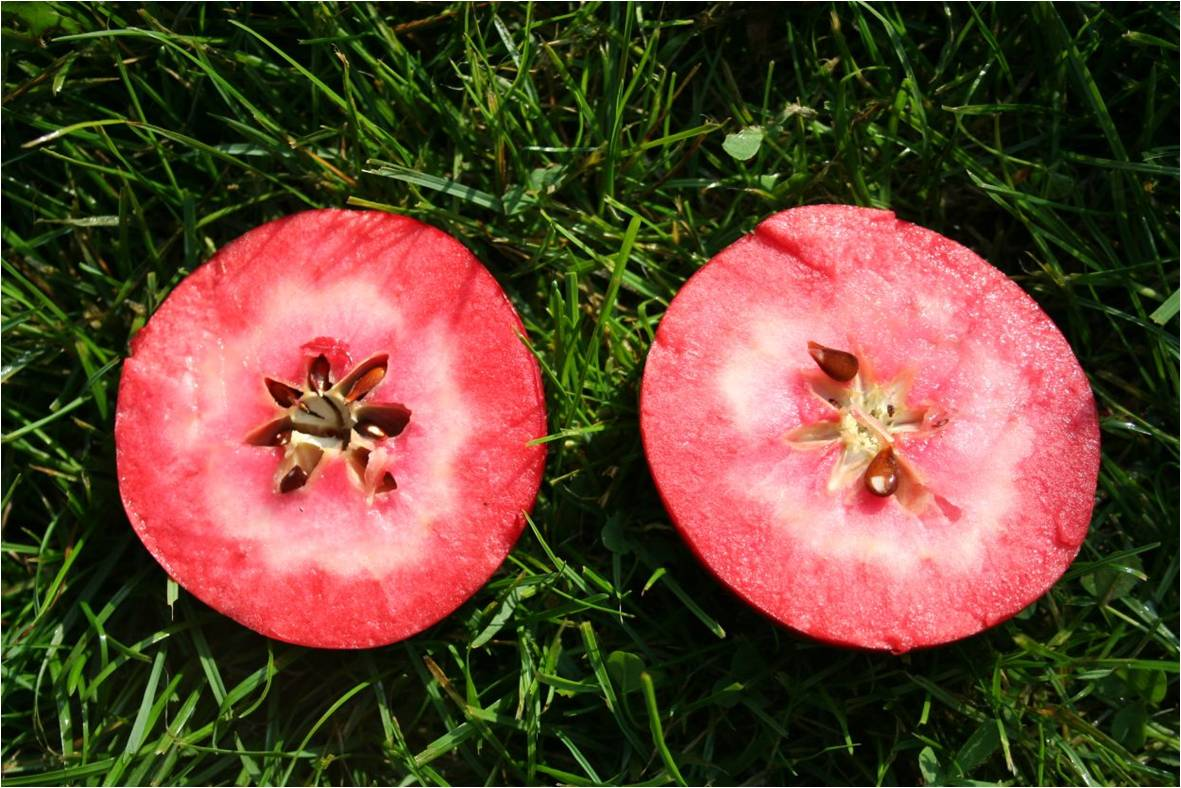
Horizontal cross-section of a 'Redlove Era' apple
