= Red Love (1982 film) =

- Theatrical release poster
- Directed by: Rosa von Praunheim
- Screenplay by: Rosa von Praunheim
- Based on: Red Love by Alexandra Kollontai
- Produced by: Rosa von Praunheim
- Starring: Helga Goetze; Eddie Constantine; Sascha Hammer; Mark Eins; Olga Demetriescu; Rose Hammer; Bettina Sukroff
- Cinematography: Mike Kuchar
- Edited by: Elke Granke; Rosa von Praunheim
- Music by: Ideal, DIN A Testbild, Jakob Lichtmann
- Production company: Rosa von Praunheim Filmproduktion
- Release date: 20 February 1982
- Running time: 80 minutes
- Country: West Germany
- Language: German

Red Love (German: Rote Liebe) is a 1982 German film directed by Rosa von Praunheim.

The film premiered at Berlin International Film Festival in 1982 and was shown, for example, at Museum of Modern Art in New York City in 1983.

== Plot ==
This film, based on a novella by Alexandra Kollontai, is about the Soviet women's rights activist and revolutionary Vasilissa, who wants to emancipate herself from her domineering lover Vladimir, the director of the trade cooperative. The last resort left to her is to kill the bitter patriarch.

== Reception ==
The renowned German critic Hellmuth Karasek wrote in the magazine Der Spiegel: "Rosa von Praunheim, who since his early hits The Bed Sausage and Berlin Bed Sausage has known how to put us out of our minds about the neat distinction between kitsch and art, between emotion and sentimentality, has also staged a pleasurably disturbing conundrum with Red Love."
