= Seth Goldman (businessman) =

American businessman (born 1965)

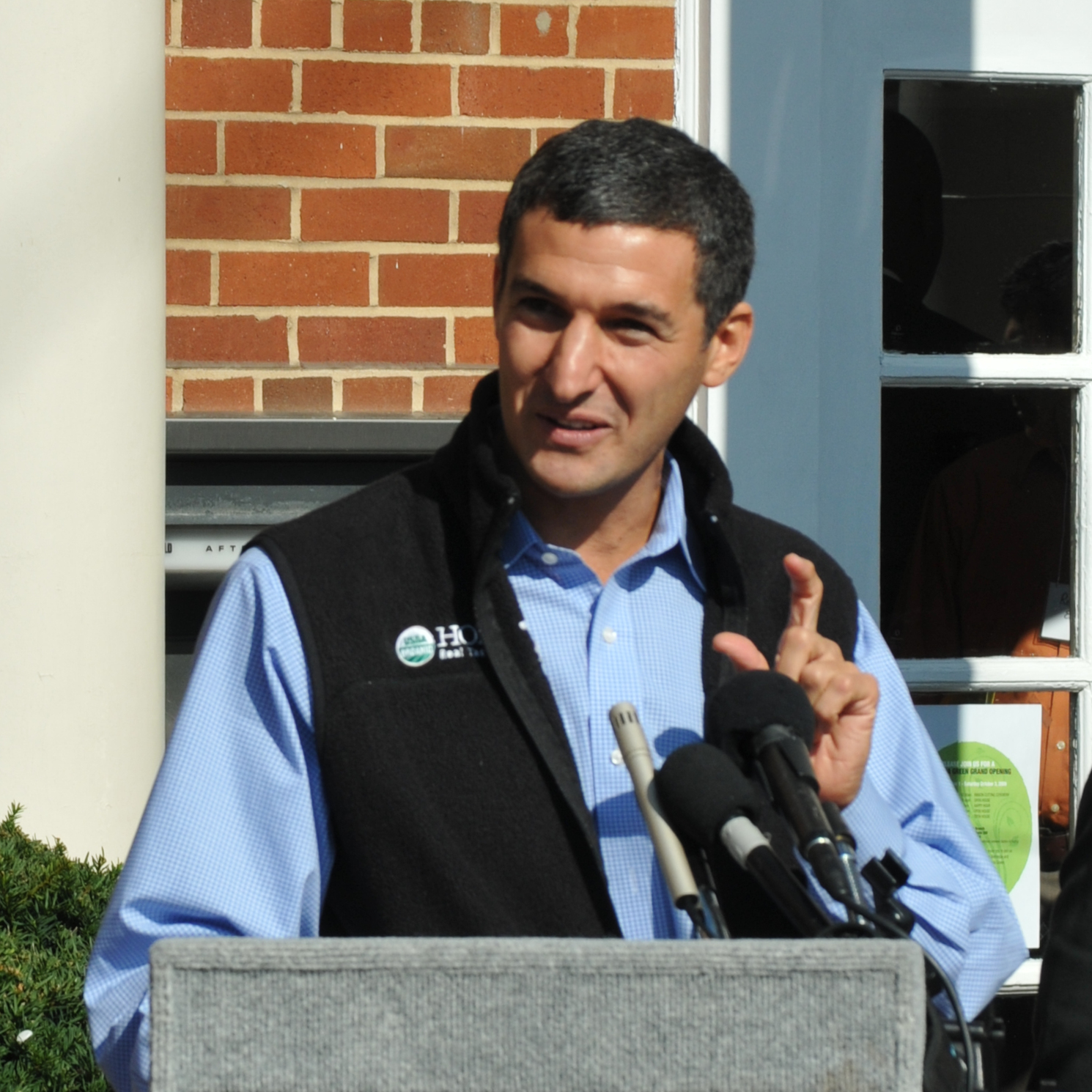
- Seth Goldman in 2009
- Born: 1965 (age 60–61)
- Education: Noble and Greenough School; Harvard University; Yale School of Management
- Occupations: Businessman, CEO Honest Tea
- Spouse: Julie Farkas
- Parent(s): Marshall Goldman; Merle Goldman

Seth Goldman (born 1965) is an American businessman. He is the former CEO of Honest Tea which he co-founded in 1998 with his former business professor, Barry Nalebuff. Goldman is the executive chairman of Beyond Meat, a plant-based protein company based in El Segundo, California.

== Personal life and early career ==
Goldman was born in 1965 and was raised in Wellesley, Massachusetts. He is Jewish. His father is the economist Marshall Goldman, and his mother, Merle Goldman, was a professor of Chinese history at Boston University. Goldman graduated from Noble and Greenough School in 1983.

Goldman attended Harvard University, where he studied government affairs and was a student athlete, competing in cross country running and track and field. During his freshman year, he lived in Straus Hall, where NHL executive Peter Chiarelli and Canadian Prime Minister Mark Carney were his roommates. After graduating in 1987, he taught English for a year in Russia and at a Beijing university. Afterwards, he worked on Michael Dukakis' presidential campaign in 1988. He then served for three years as a deputy press secretary for Dukakis' running mate, United States Senator Lloyd Bentsen of Texas. According to the Boston Herald, he exited the political arena and enrolled in the Yale School of Management after determining that "private enterprise could promote the public good".

Goldman was a volunteer for Americorps. He interned for the United States Department of State.

Goldman married Julie Farkas in 1990, whom he met while working on Lloyd Bentsen’s vice presidential campaign. After they met they both did work at the cooperative school in Moscow where they both taught English. He has three sons. Goldman and his family are vegans.

After graduating from the Yale School of Management in 1995, he worked at the mutual fund company Calvert Investments, which concentrates on socially conscious investments. He served as a vice president for the company.

== Honest Tea ==
Goldman co-founded Honest Tea at the end of January 1998. He first conceived of a low-calorie beverage company as an MBA student at the Yale School of Management in 1995. After doing a case study about Coca-Cola vs. Pepsi for a competitive strategies class, he discovered "many high-calorie, sugary drinks and many no-calorie bottled waters on the market" but few beverages in the middle. He pondered concocting a low-calorie, flavorful beverage, but did not execute the idea until three years later on a trip to New York City. He trotted around Central Park with a friend and ate together at a restaurant afterwards. They looked at the menu and found none of the drinks pleasing. Goldman emailed Barry Nalebuff, his former Yale professor, asking him if the low-calorie beverage idea still was sound. Nalebuff mentored Goldman and together they decided to create a new tea. Nalebuff provided most of the $500,000 in seed funding, while Goldman contributed a smaller amount after fundraising from his friends and family. Nalebuff came up with the name "Honest Tea", which sounds like "honesty". Goldman built an office in the guest bedroom of his home, which he shared with his wife and three small children.

Coca-Cola paid $43 million for 40% of Honest Tea with the choice of purchasing the entire company in 2011. Several organic aficionados disapproved of the sale to Coca-Cola because Goldman was required to purchase several dozen contracts from independent distributors that aided in growing Honest Tea.

In 2013, Goldman coauthored a graphic book with his Honest Tea co-founder Barry Nalebuff, detailing their experiences founding and running the company. Jason Abbruzzese reviewed the book for the Financial Times, writing, "The narrative is at its best when balancing the personalities of the founders: Goldman's socially conscious side and Nalebuff's economic expertise."

Goldman stepped down from his role as CEO of Honest Tea in 2015 and became the executive chair of Beyond Meat. He retained ownership of no more than 10% of Honest Tea. Goldman kept the same salary as he moved to a part-time position at Honest Tea in which he would assist Coca-Cola's Venture and Emerging Brands Unit with connecting with customers. He made the change in part because his youngest son graduated from high school. According to a 2019 article in The Washington Post, Goldman continued to do work for Honest Tea.

Honest Tea brand was discontinued by Coca-Cola in 2022 with the company deciding to focus on their other tea brands, Gold Peak and Peace Tea, though Honest Kids brand would remain in production.Seth Goldman Interview with Yale

Following the discontinuation, he and his co-founder at Eat the Change, Spike Mendelsohn, launched a new tea brand called Just Ice Tea

== Beyond Meat ==
After his wife reviewed a piece discussing Beyond Meat, a company that created meat substitutes, in 2012 Goldman invested in the company. He became executive chairman of Beyond Meat in 2015 and worked part-time for Honest Tea in Bethesda, Maryland and part-time for Beyond Meat in Manhattan Beach, California. When Beyond Meat held its initial public offering on May 2, 2019, Goldman owned 2% of its shares.
