= Grigory Baklanov =

Soviet Russian writer

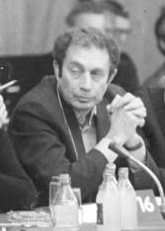
- Baklanov in 1981
- Born: Grigory Yakovlevich Friedman; 11 September 1923; Voronezh, Russian SFSR, USSR
- Died: 23 December 2009 (aged 86); Moscow, Russia

Grigory Yakovlevich Baklanov (Russian: Григо́рий Я́ковлевич Бакла́нов) (11 September 1923 – 23 December 2009) was a Soviet and Russian writer, well known for his novels about World War II, and as the editor of the literary magazine Znamya. Becoming the editor in 1986, during Mikhail Gorbachev's reforms, Baklanov published the works that were previously banned by Soviet censors; his drive for glasnost boosted the magazine's circulation to 1 million copies.

== Biography ==
Baklanov was born Grigory Yakovlevich Friedman in Voronezh. In 1941, when the Nazis invaded the Soviet Union, Baklanov was 17. He volunteered for the front, becoming the youngest soldier in his regiment. Later, as an artillery lieutenant, Baklanov commanded a platoon that fought in Ukraine, Moldova, Hungary, Romania, and Austria. In 1943, he was badly injured and left partly disabled. Despite this, Baklanov rejoined his regiment and fought at the front until the end of the war. He was awarded the Order of the Red Star and the Order of the Great Patriotic War, first class.

Baklanov's early (unpublished) fiction related his World War II experiences. In 1951, he graduated from the Gorky Literary Institute in Moscow. His first published novel about the war, South of the Main Offensive (1957), describes fierce battles in which he had participated in Hungary. It was dedicated to the memory of his two older brothers, who were killed in the war.

According to Baklanov, his true literary debut was in 1959, with publication of his second novel, The Foothold (in Russian––Pyadʹ zemli, or Five Inches of Land). It was relentlessly criticized at home, but brought international fame to the writer: The Foothold was published in 36 countries. Soviet critics attacked Baklanov for describing events from an ordinary soldier's perspective, a depiction that conflicted with the propagandist official version of the war.

In his 1964 novel July 1941, Baklanov was among the first to reveal that Stalin’s purge of the Red Army during the 1930s was responsible for Soviet unpreparedness for war, which resulted in millions dying and being captured. The purge destroyed the army’s command and was chiefly responsible for the disproportionately high Soviet losses in 1941. Upon publication, July 1941 was banned in the USSR for 12 years. In 2003, the writer elucidated on his message in the novel: "I wrote about the people’s tragedy, and about the greatest crime, which caused the year 1941, with millions killed, millions captured prisoner, of whom the main criminal Stalin had said: 'We have no prisoners, we have only traitors.'"

Baklanov wrote novels, short stories, non-fiction, memoirs, plays, and screenplays. Eight feature films, based on his fiction, were produced. The most popular among them is the 1970 television film Byl mesyats mai (It was in May), directed by Marlen Khutsiev. It won a prize at the 1971 Golden Prague International Television Festival. In 1975, Yuri Lyubimov of Taganka Theater in Moscow staged Baklanov’s play Pristegnite remni! (Fasten your belts!).

Baklanov’s novel, Forever Nineteen (1979), is a tribute to his generation, which was almost wiped out by World War II. In the foreword to the 1989 American edition, Baklanov wrote: “I was seventeen and finishing high school when the war broke out. We had twenty boys and twenty girls in our class. Almost all the boys went to the front, but I was the only one to return alive… I wanted people living now to care about them as friends, as family, as brothers.”

Translated into English by Antonina Bouis, Forever Nineteen was described in The New York Times as a “piercing account of a Russian soldier’s experiences during World War II,” which “belongs on a shelf next to, say … Erich Maria Remarque’s All Quiet on the Western Front.” Forever Nineteen was translated into scores of languages and earned Baklanov the USSR State Prize.

The novel The Moment Between the Past and the Future (Russian title––Svoi chelovek, 1990), translated into English by Catherine Porter, portrays the end of Leonid Brezhnev’s stagnation era, which preceded Gorbachev’s perestroika. It is also a story of a successful playwright, Usvatov, who leads a pampered life of the Soviet cultural elite. By becoming part of the corrupt apparatus of power, Usvatov has betrayed the values of his idealistic generation.

During Mikhail Gorbachev’s reforms, Baklanov attained prominence as the editor of Znamya literary magazine. Under his editorship, the magazine’s circulation rose to 1 million copies. It published a number of previously suppressed works, such as Mikhail Bulgakov’s novella Heart of a Dog, Alexander Tvardovsky’s poem By Right of Memory, Vasily Grossman’s travel account An Armenian Sketchbook, Georgi Vladimov’s novel Faithful Ruslan, etc. Baklanov edited Znamya from 1986 to 1993.

In July 1988, during Gorbachev’s 19th Party Conference, Baklanov addressed an audience of 5,000 delegates, predominantly Party and Soviet functionaries, whom he urged not to obstruct freedom of the press: “The one, who struggles today against glasnost, is only struggling to become enslaved.” The conference took place during the withdrawal of Soviet troops from Afghanistan. Baklanov referred to this war as a “political adventure” (it was then officially described as a Soviet international mission) and demanded to call those responsible to account. Baklanov's speech was broadcast on national TV, which is why he received a flood of response. Notably, supportive letters came from Afghan War veterans. One of the letters contained 1,418 signatures, the number of days World War II was fought on the Eastern Front (from 22 June 1941 till 9 May 1945).

In 1994, Baklanov appealed to President Boris Yeltsin in an article in Izvestia, urging him to use diplomacy to prevent Russia's war with Chechnya.

From 1989 to 2001, Baklanov helped oversee programs of George Soros’ Foundation in Moscow ("Cultural Initiative" and "Open Society"), which funded education, culture, and science in post-Soviet Russia.

In 1993, Baklanov signed the Letter of Forty-Two, an appeal by prominent intellectuals to President Yeltsin and the Russian government whom they urged to ban propaganda of communism, ultra-nationalism and racism. This was in response to the events of October 1993.

In 1997, Baklanov was awarded the State Prize of the Russian Federation for his novella I togda prikhodyat marodyory (And then come the pillagers). The novella depicts Russia's lawlessness and corruption of the 1990s as an outcome of Stalinism, which had never been uprooted in the country. The novella ends symbolically: a gang of Russian neo-fascists attacks and kills the main protagonist, a veteran of World War II.

In October 2008, one year before he died, the writer said in an interview for the TV channel Kultura: “Of all the human deeds I know (I have neither experienced a ghetto or a concentration camp), war is the most terrible and inhumane deed.”

Baklanov died in Moscow on 23 December 2009, at age 86.

== English Translations ==
- The Foothold, London: Chapman and Hall, 1962.
- South of the Main Offensive, London: Chapman and Hall, 1963.
- Forever Nineteen, New York: J.B. Lippincott, 1989.
- The Moment Between the Past and the Future, London & Boston: Faber and Faber, 1994.

== Honours and awards ==
- Order For Merit to the Fatherland 3rd class
- Order of the Red Star
- Order of the Patriotic War 1st class
- Order of the Red Banner of Labour
- Order of the Badge of Honour
- Order of Friendship of Peoples
- Medal "For Strengthening Military Cooperation"
- Medal "For the Capture of Budapest"
- Medal "For the Capture of Vienna"
- Medal "For the Victory over Germany in the Great Patriotic War 1941–1945"
- State Prize of the USSR
- State Prize of the Russian Federation

Baklanov was an Academician of the Russian Academy of Arts (since 1995), a member of the Presidential Council for Culture and Art (1996––2001), and a council member of Memorial, Russia's historical and civil rights society, founded in 1989 to commemorate victims of Stalin’s repressions.
