= Gold Peak (disambiguation) =

Gold Peak is an Asian manufacturer and brand of batteries and chargers.

Gold Peak can also refer to:

- Gold Peak Tea, a brand of the Coca-Cola company
- Peak gold, a speculation in economics

== See also ==
- Golden Peak, a mountain in the Gilgit-Baltistan region of Pakistan
