= Honest Tea =

Discontinued bottled organic tea company

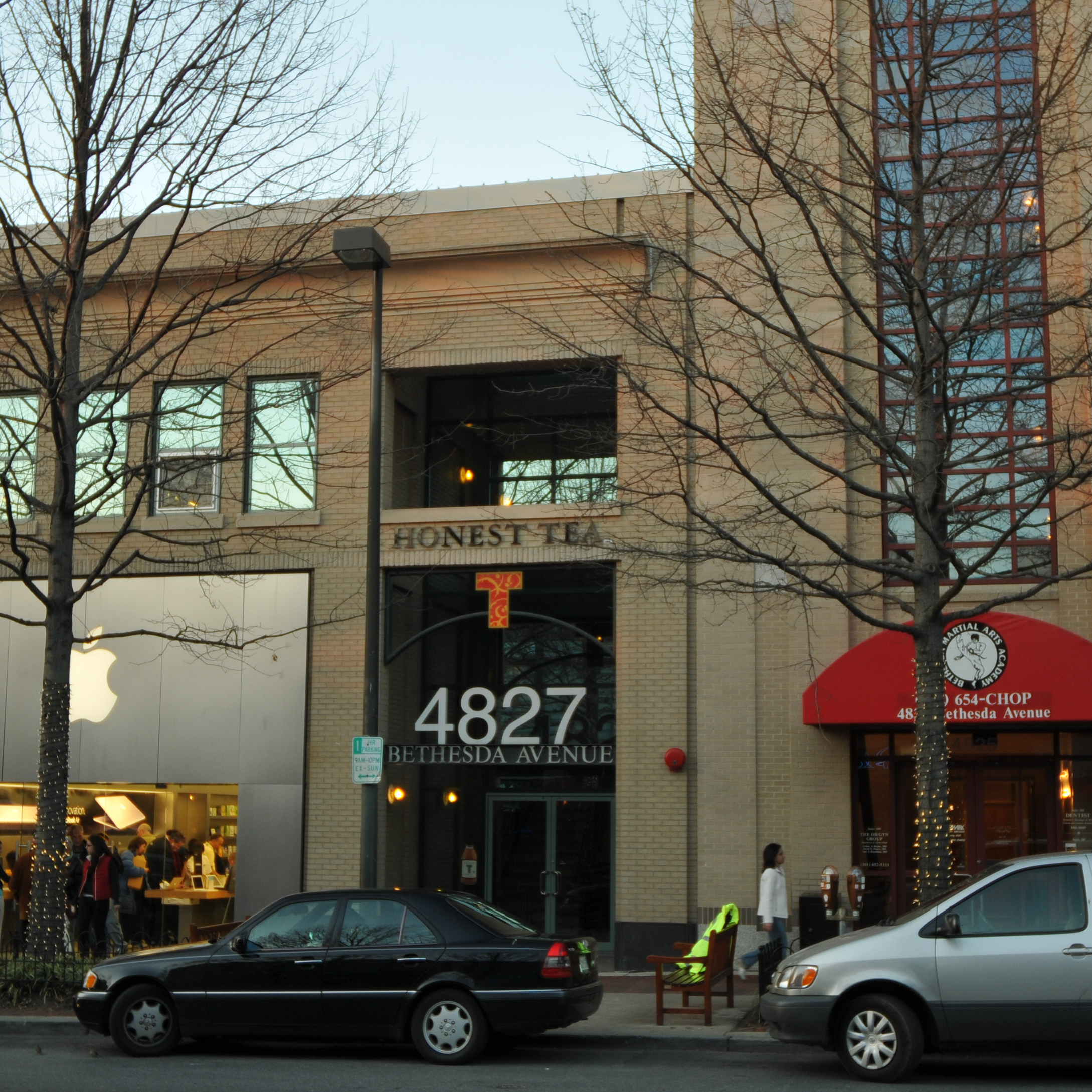
- Type: Iced tea
- Manufacturer: Honest Tea, Inc (1998–2011); The Coca-Cola Company (2011–2022)
- Distributor: The Coca-Cola Company
- Origin: United States
- Introduced: 1998; 28 years ago
- Discontinued: December 31, 2022; 3 years ago
- Website: www.honesttea.com (redirects to Honest Kids page of Coca-Cola website)

Honest Tea (U.S.) was a bottled organic tea company based in Bethesda, Maryland. It was founded in 1998 by Seth Goldman and Barry Nalebuff, and ultimately sold to become a wholly owned subsidiary of The Coca-Cola Company. The tea brand ceased production on December 31, 2022.

== History ==
Honest Tea was founded in 1998 by Seth Goldman, a graduate of Harvard and the Yale School of Management who got the idea to found a beverage company while he was at business school. There were two key ideas behind the company: to bring beverages to market that were organic and not as heavily sweetened, and to conduct the business using fair trade principles. Goldman and one of his Yale professors, Barry Nalebuff, conceived the idea for the company and raised $500,000 in startup funds from friends and family.

The first order for Honest Tea was from Fresh Fields, an East Coast natural grocery chain that was later acquired by Whole Foods Market. Honest Tea was available on Independence Air flights. By 2006, Honest Tea had revenue of $13.5 million and was selling about 1.5 million cases a year.

The Coca-Cola Company purchased a 40-percent stake of the U.S. company at $43 million in 2008. It bought the rest of the company in 2011.

In 2009, Honest Tea US received an unpaid endorsement when The New York Times reported that it was President Barack Obama's preferred beverage.

A separate small company, Springleaf, controls the Honest Tea trademark in Australia. Honest Tea lost an attempt to claim the rights to the phrase in Australia in 2007. In 2015, Annabel Young won her case against Coca-Cola in Australia as the original brand name holder, retaining the Honest Tea brand.

In 2021, Coca-Cola introduced Honest Yerba Mate. Yerba mate is a traditional beverage in South America, brewed from leaves and stems of the yerba mate plant.

On May 23, 2022, Coca-Cola announced it would stop carrying Honest Tea beverages as of December 31, 2022. Coca-Cola decided it would only carry two brands of tea, Gold Peak Tea and Peace Tea, because they are "best positioned to meet consumer preferences for high-quality brewed teas with different levels of sweetness and flavor". Coca-Cola expected that discontinuing the Honest tea line would allow it to "prioritize production and distribution" of other beverages, particularly in light of ongoing supply-chain issues that have caused Coca-Cola to be unable to meet consumer demand for Gold Peak. Coca-Cola said it plans to continue carrying its line of Honest Kids organic fruit juices. Honest Tea is one of approximately 200 brands that Coca-Cola decided to discontinue carrying between 2020 and 2022.

Following Coca-Cola’s announcement that it would discontinue Honest Tea products, Honest Tea founders Seth Goldman and Barry Nalebuff returned to the bottled tea business alongside celebrity chef Spike Mendelsohn with the launch of Just Ice Tea in September 2022.
