= Avinash Dixit =

American economist (born 1943)

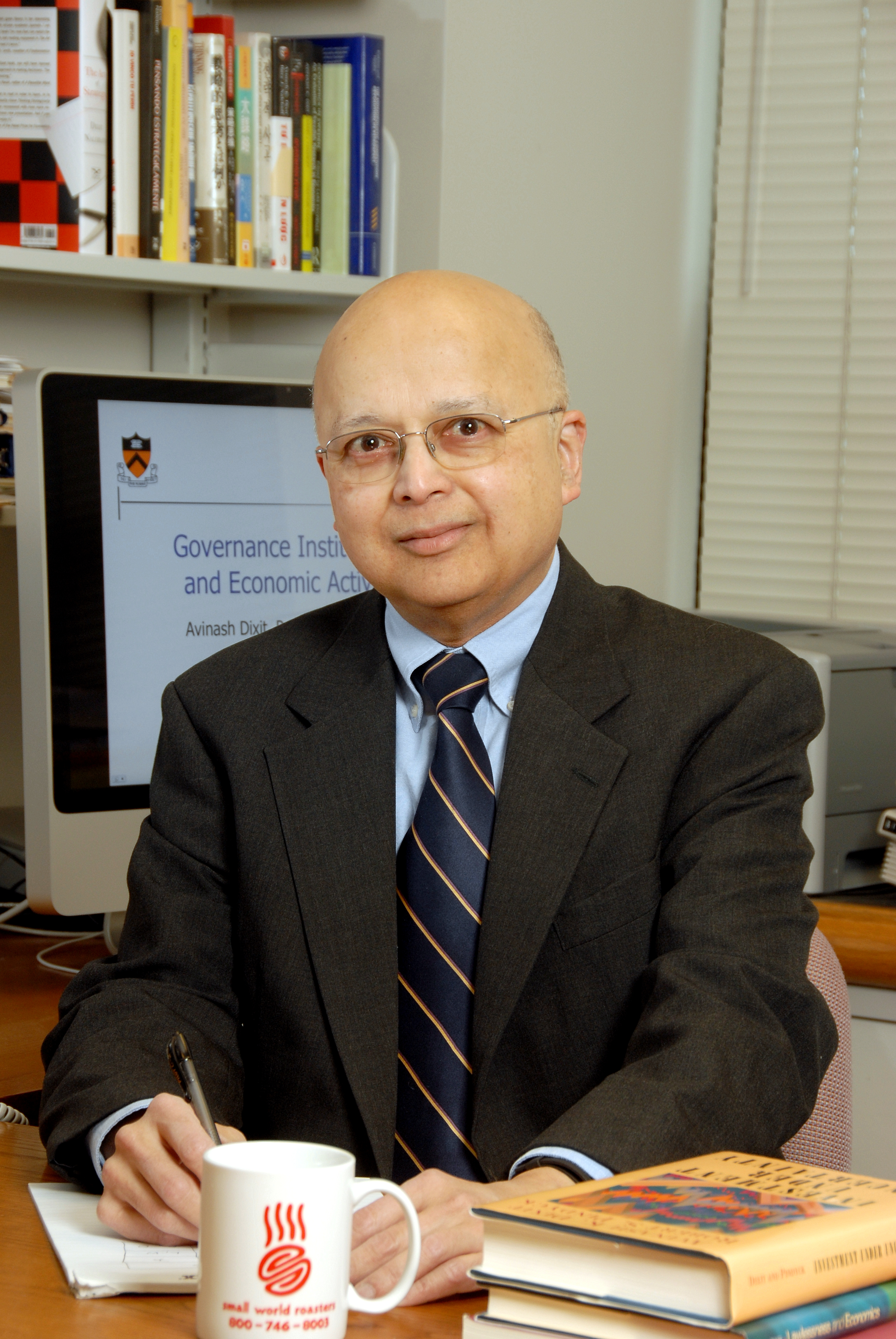
- Born: 6 August 1944 (age 82); Bombay, Bombay Province, British India

Academic background
- Alma mater: St. Xavier's College, Mumbai (B.Sc.); University of Mumbai; University of Cambridge (B.A.); MIT (Ph.D.)
- Doctoral advisor: Robert Solow

Academic work
- Discipline: Economics
- Institutions: Princeton University; Lingnan University (Hong Kong); Nuffield College, Oxford; University of Warwick
- Doctoral students: Vijay Kelkar; Robert Helsley; Dani Rodrik
- Awards: Padma Vibhushan; John von Neumann Award (2001)
- Website: Information at IDEAS / RePEc

Avinash Kamalakar Dixit (born 6 August 1944) is an Indian-American economist. He is the John J.F. Sherrerd '52 University Professor of Economics Emeritus at Princeton University. He has been a distinguished adjunct professor of economics at Lingnan University (Hong Kong), senior research fellow at Nuffield College, Oxford and Sanjaya Lall Senior Visiting Research Fellow at Green Templeton College, Oxford.

== Education ==
Dixit received a B.Sc. from University of Mumbai (St. Xavier's College) in 1963 in Mathematics and Physics, a B.A. from Cambridge University in 1965 in Mathematics (Corpus Christi College, First Class), and a Ph.D. in 1968 from the Massachusetts Institute of Technology in Economics.

== Career ==
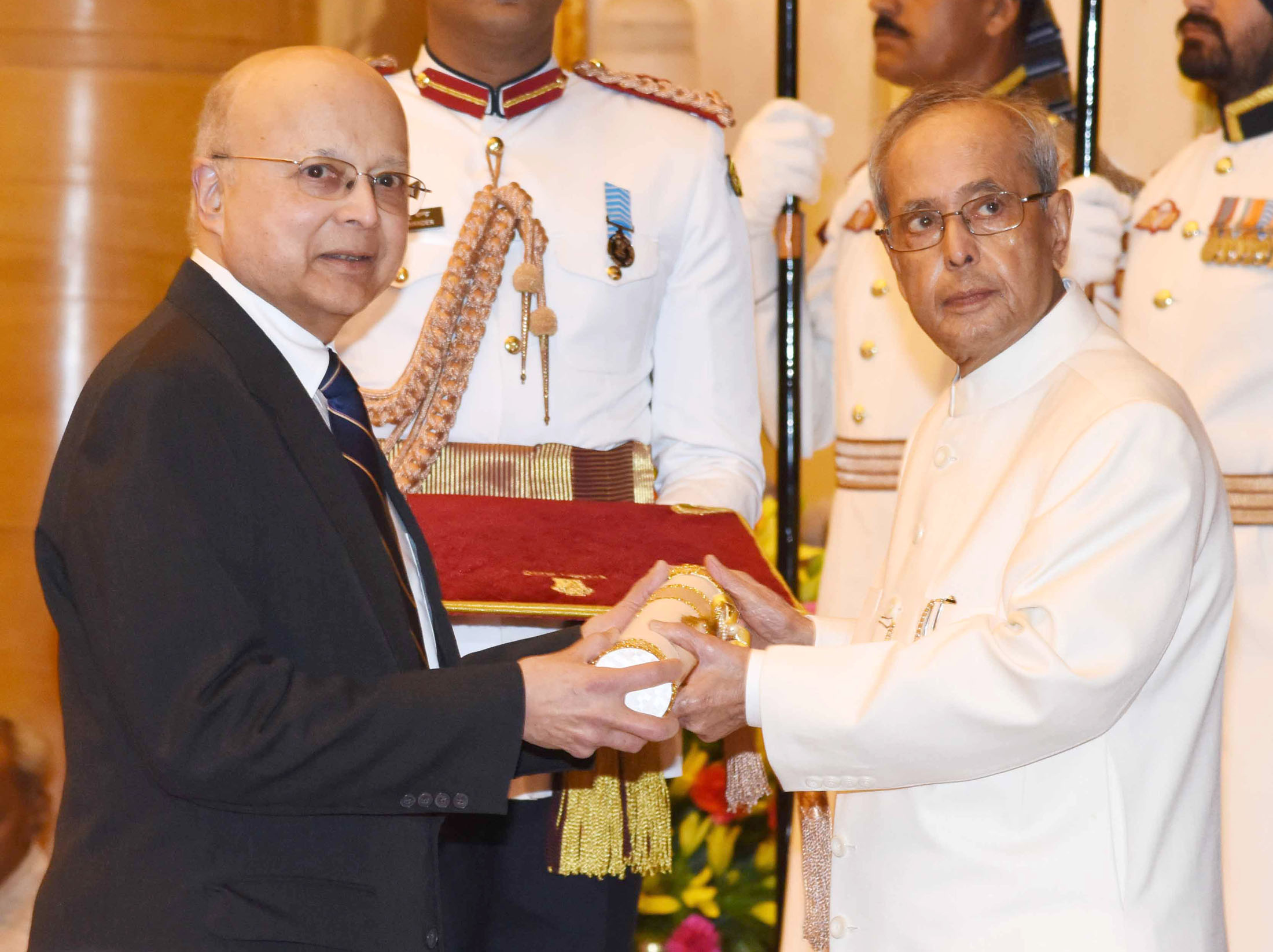
The President, Shri Pranab Mukherjee presenting the Padma Vibhushan Award to Shri Avinash Kamalakar Dixit, at a Civil Investiture Ceremony, at Rashtrapati Bhavan, in New Delhi on March 28, 2016

Dixit is the John J.F. Sherrerd '52 University Professor of Economics at Princeton University since July 1989, and emeritus since 2010. He was also distinguished adjunct professor of economics at Lingnan University (Hong Kong), senior research fellow at Nuffield College, Oxford and Sanjaya Lall Senior Visiting Research Fellow at Green Templeton College, Oxford. He previously taught at Massachusetts Institute of Technology, at the University of California, Berkeley, at Balliol College, Oxford and at the University of Warwick. In 1994, Dixit received the first-ever CES Fellow Award from the Center for Economic Studies at LMU Munich in Germany. In January 2016, India conferred the Padma Vibhushan – the second highest of India's civilian honors to Dr. Dixit.

Dixit has also held visiting scholar positions at the International Monetary Fund and the Russell Sage Foundation. He was president of the Econometric Society in 2001, and was vice-president (2002) and president (2008) of the American Economic Association. He was elected to the American Academy of Arts and Sciences in 1992, the National Academy of Sciences in 2005, and the American Philosophical Society in 2010. He has also been on the Social Sciences jury for the Infosys Prize from 2011.

A noted publication was a foundational contribution to the modern development of work on second-best optimum tax theory in his 1975 Welfare effects of tax and price changes Journal of Public Economics. With Robert Pindyck he is author of "Investment Under Uncertainty" (Princeton University Press, 1994; ISBN 0691034109), the first textbook exclusively about the real options approach to investments, and described as "a born-classic" in view of its importance to the theory.

== Selected publications ==
- 1976. The Theory of Equilibrium Growth. Oxford University Press.
- 1977. "Monopolistic Competition and Optimum Product Diversity", The American Economic Review, vol. 67, no. 3, p. 297–308, with Joseph E. Stiglitz.
- 1980. Theory of International Trade, with Victor Norman. Cambridge University Press
- [1976] 1990. Optimization in Economic Theory, 2nd ed., Oxford. Description and contents preview.
- 1991. Thinking Strategically: The Competitive Edge in Business, Politics, and Everyday Life, with Barry Nalebuff, New York: W.W. Norton.
- 1993. The Art of Smooth Pasting, Vol. 55 of series Fundamentals of Pure and Applied Economics, eds. Jacques Lesourne and Hugo Sonnenschein. Reading, UK: Harwood Academic Publishers.
- 1996a.Investment Under Uncertainty, co-authored by Robert Pindyck. Princeton University Press.
- 1996b. The Making of Economic Policy: A Transaction Cost Politics Perspective (Munich Lectures in Economics), M.I.T. Press. Description.
- 2004. Lawlessness and Economics: Alternative Modes of Governance], Gorman Lectures in Economics, University College London, Princeton University Press. Description and ch. 1, Economics With and Without the Law.
- 2008a. The Art of Strategy: A Game-Theorist's Guide to Success in Business and Life with Barry Nalebuff, New York: W.W. Norton.
- 2008b. "economic governance," in The New Palgrave Dictionary of Economics, 2nd Edition. Abstract.
- 2009. Games of Strategy, with Susan Skeath and David McAdams, New York: W.W. Norton, 1999, 5th edition 2020.
- 2014. Microeconomics: A Very Short Introduction, Oxford University Press.

Academic offices
Preceded by Thomas J. Sargent	President of the American Economic Association; 2008– 2009	Succeeded by Angus Deaton
