= Helsley =

Helsley is a surname. Notable people with the surname include:

- Robert Helsley (fl. 1979), American economist
- Ryan Helsley (born 1994), American baseball player
