= October Coup =

October Coup may refer to:

- October Revolution in Russia, 1917
- 1993 Russian constitutional crisis
