= Marietta Chudakova =

Russian literary critic and writer (1937–2021)

- Мариэтта Чудакова
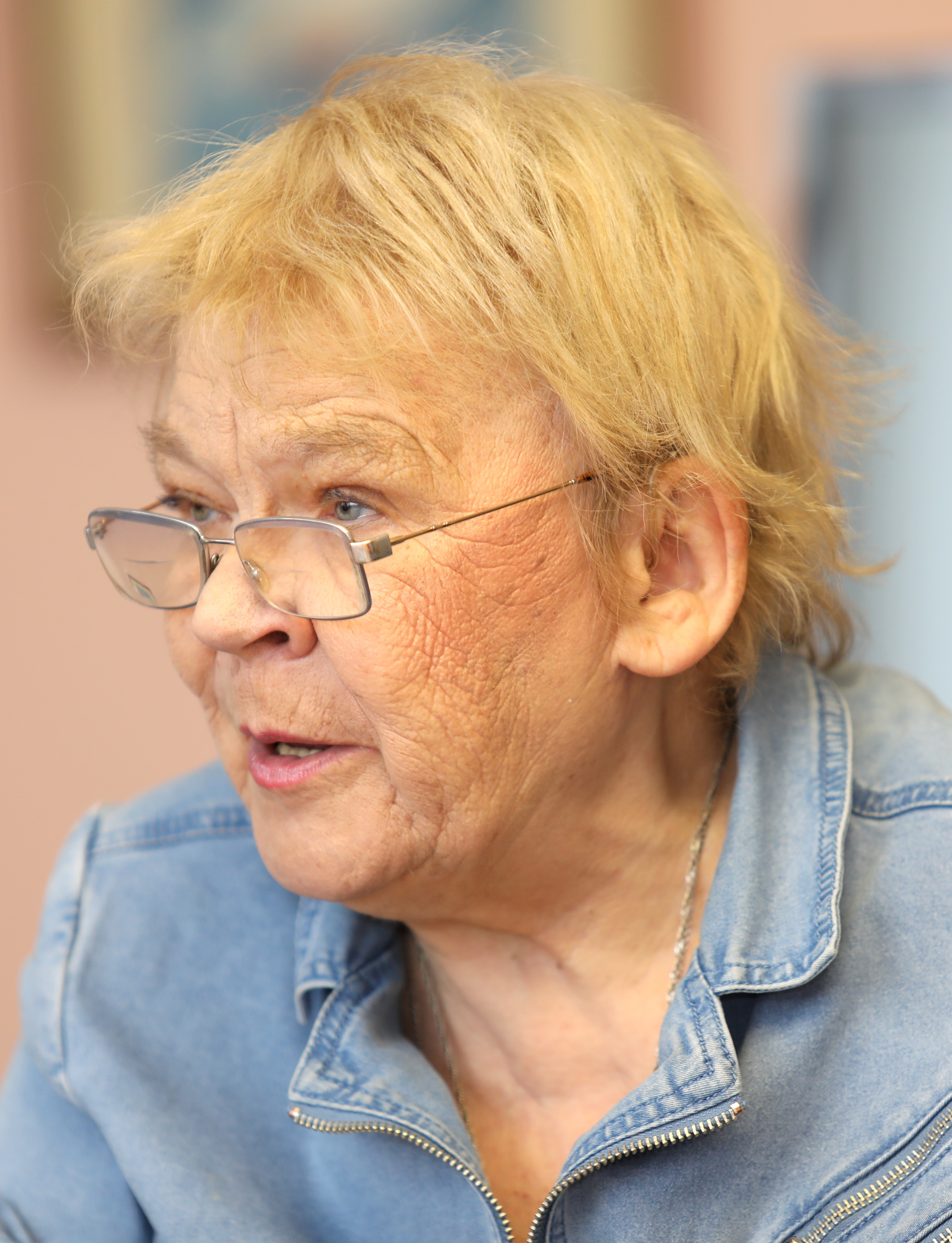
- Born: 2 January 1937; Moscow, Russian SFSR, Soviet Union
- Died: 21 November 2021 (aged 84); Moscow, Russia
- Citizenship: Moscow
- Education: MSU
- Spouse: Alexander Chudakov
- Children: 1
- Writing career
- Years active: 1965–2021
- Genre: Literary criticism
- Notable awards: Moscow Komsomol Prize (1969)

Marietta Omarovna Chudakova (Russian: Мариэтта Омаровна Чудакова; 2 January 1937 – 21 November 2021) was a Soviet and Russian literary critic, historian, doctor of philological sciences, writer, and memoirist.

She was the chairman of the All-Russian Bulgakov Foundation.

== Early life and education ==
Chudakova was the fourth child in her family. Her father was Omar Kurbanovich Khan-Magomedov, an engineer and a native of Dagestan. Her mother was Klavdia Vasilyevna Makhova, a preschool teacher.

Chudakova graduated from Moscow School No. 367, then in 1959, the Faculty of Philology of Moscow State University. Her first works were published in 1958. From 1959 to 1961, she taught Russian language and literature in a Moscow school. In 1964, after completing graduate school, she defended her thesis for the degree of Candidate of Philology.

== Career ==
She was chosen as Laureate of the Prize of the Moscow Komsomol in 1969. In 1970, she was inducted into the Union of Soviet Writers. Since 1991 she has been a member of Academia Europaea.

In October 1993, in connection with the dispersal of the Supreme Council, Chudakova signed the Letter of Forty-Two.

In 2007, she was included in the first three candidates of the party Union of Right Forces in the elections to the State Duma. The Union of Right Forces did not overcome the 5% barrier, receiving less than 1% of the votes. According to Chudakova, she was engaged in politics that year, because too few people take an active political position.

In April 2010, she signed an appeal by the Russian opposition Putin Must Go.

In 2014, she was one of 180 representatives of different professions who signed an open letter headlined Do Not Cave In. Do Not Succumb to Lies protesting the Russian annexation of Crimea.

She was the chairman of the All-Russian Bulgakov Foundation.

== Personal life ==
She was married to the literary critic Alexander Chudakov and she has a daughter. Chudakova was diagnosed with COVID-19 in November 2021, and was taken to intensive care. She died on 21 November 2021.
