= Znamya =

Russian literary magazine

- Cover of Znamya
- Editor-in-Chief: Sergey Chuprinin
- Former editors: Grigory Baklanov (1986-1993), Yuriy Voronov (1984-1986), Vadim Kozhevnikov (1949-1984), Vsevolod Vishnevsky (1934-1948)
- Categories: Literary Magazine
- Frequency: Monthly
- Circulation: 1,000
- Founded: 1931
- First issue: 1931
- Country: Russia
- Based in: 123001, Moscow, Bolshaya Sadovaya Street, b. 2/46
- Language: Russian
- Website: https://znamlit.ru/
- ISSN: 0130-1616

Znamya (Russian: Знамя, IPA: [ˈznamʲə], lit. "The Banner") is a monthly Russian-language thick journal established in Moscow in 1931. It publishes traditional and experimental literature, including prose, poetry, essays, literary criticism, and bibliography. During Soviet times, it was an organ of the Union of Soviet Writers. It has been an independent publication since 1990.

In 1972, the magazine had a circulation of some 160,000 copies. Circulation peaked at 1,000,000 copies in 1990, but by 2023, it was down to 1,000 copies.

The magazine has published writers such as Anna Akhmatova, Mikhail Bulgakov, Osip Mandelstam, Andrei Platonov, Isaac Babel, Varlam Shalamov, Vasil Bykov, Joseph Brodsky, Evgeny Rein, Alexander Kushner, Natalya Gorbanevskaya, Olga Sedakova, Tatyana Tolstaya, Lyudmila Petrushevskaya, Viktor Pelevin, Victor Sosnora, and Arkadii Dragomoshchenko.

== History ==
Between 1931 and 1932 Znamya was published under the name of Lokaf ("Локаф," an abbreviation of "Литературное объединение писателей Красной Армии и Флота," or Literary Association of Writers of the Red Army and Fleet). During the Soviet era (1934–1990) Znamya was an organ of the Union of Soviet Writers. At that time, it dedicated most of its pages to short stories and novels about the military, publishing works by Konstantin Simonov, Vasily Grossman, Pavel Antokolsky and others.

In 1948, due to insufficient disclosure of cosmopolitanism and the publication of а novella by Emmanuil Kazakevich, called Two on the Steppes ("Двое в степи"), a large part of the editorial staff was fired.

In April 1954, the magazine published poems from the novel "Doctor Zhivago" by Boris Pasternak.

Grigory Baklanov, a WWII-generation writer, became the editor of Znamya in 1986. As was said at the time, Znamya had become "the flagman of Perestroika." The magazine has a liberal orientation.

During the 1990s, the magazine received a grant from the Open Society Institute.

In 2010, the Znamya Magazine Prize was awarded to Lyudmila Ulitskaya and Mikhail Khodorkovsky, for their letters to each other. Khodorovsky was in prison at the time. The prize was established in 1993 and awarded annually for the best publications in the magazine in the previous year.

== See also ==
- List of literary magazines
- Zhdanov doctrine
