= Co-opetition (book) =

1996 book by Adam M. Brandenburger and Barry J. Nalebuff

- Softcover edition
- Author: Adam M. Brandenburger and Barry J. Nalebuff
- Language: English
- Subject: Strategy, game theory, coopetition
- Genre: Non-fiction
- Publisher: Crown Business
- Publication date: May 1, 1996
- Publication place: United States
- Media type: Print, e-book
- Pages: 304 pp.
- ISBN: 978-0385479509

Co-opetition: A Revolution Mindset that Combines Competition and Cooperation is a non-fiction book on coopetition (co-operative competition), business strategy, and game theory by Adam M. Brandenburger and Barry J. Nalebuff. The book was initially published by Crown Business on May 1, 1996. As of 2015, the book is still available in its 9th printing.

== Overview ==
Coopetition or co-opetition is a neologism coined to describe the concept of cooperation between competitors. Coopetition is a portmanteau of cooperation and competition.

The text discusses at length the notion of coopetition, a business strategy gained from game theory to demonstrate when it is better for competitors to work together rather than to go up against one another in contest. The authors use many examples to show the simultaneous interplay between competition and cooperation. Their research added to previous industry analysis such as Michael Porter’s five forces model, which focused almost entirely on competition between businesses.

== Reception ==
Terry Clark, in the Journal of Marketing, gave the book a mostly positive review but criticized it for presenting old ideas as new ones under different names. Barbara Noble in Strategy+Business, wrote that "Since the book is full of good stories, it's hard not to recommend it, but readers looking for science are likely to be disappointed."

== See also ==
- Complementors
- Competitive altruism
- Coopetition
- Frenemy
- Negarchy
- Six forces model
- Thinking Strategically: The Competitive Edge in Business, Politics, and Everyday Life also co-authored by Barry Nalebuff
