= 600 Seconds =

Soviet/Russian TV program (1987–93)

600 Seconds (Russian: 600 секунд; 1987 to 1993) was a popular TV news program that aired in the Soviet Union and briefly in post-Soviet Russia. It was a nightly broadcast from Leningrad TV (later Channel 5) with anchor Alexander Nevzorov.

The program of the glasnost period was distinguished by its fast tempo and the display of the countdown from 600 to zero. The anchor Nevzorov used the broadcast in order to criticize corrupt Soviet officials and promote preserving the Soviet Union (in the Baltic States, he is known as a fierce opponent of the national independence movements). Later during the early Boris Yeltsin years, the broadcast became a mouthpiece of Russian nationalist opposition to Yeltsin's policies and was banned twice – definitively after Yeltsin's victory in his conflict with the rebel parliament. The Letter of Forty-Two called for the program to be cancelled.
