= Impeachment in Russia =

Way to remove the president from his or her duties in Russia

In the Russian Federation, impeachment of the president is part of the parliamentary procedure of the Federal Assembly and provides a legal way of removing the president from office.

The impeachment procedure has been attempted three times. All three times were against Boris Yeltsin, and all three attempts failed.

== Legal procedure ==
In accordance with the current Russian legislation, the removal from office of the president is regulated by article 93 of the Constitution. It provides for indictment (impeachment) by the State Duma and should be accompanied by the opinion of the Supreme Court of Russia and Constitutional Court of Russia on observance of prescribed procedure for charging. After indictment, the decision to remove a president from office is voted on by the Federation Council.

The decision of the State Duma to indict and the decision of the Federation Council to remove the president from office must be accepted by two thirds of the respective chambers (300 and 114 votes respectively). The initiative to vote on indictment must be supported by no fewer than one third (150) of deputies of the State Duma and the conclusion of a special commission formed by the State Duma. The decision of the Federation Council on removal from office of the president of the Russian Federation must be accepted by vote no later than three months after the bringing of charges by the State Duma against the president. If within this period the Federation Council does not vote for removal, charges against the president shall be considered rejected.

The deprivation of an ex-president of his or her immunity is regulated in the same way by Article 93.

== Impeachment history ==
| Date | President | Accusation(s) | Result |
|---|---|---|---|
| March 28, 1993 | Boris Yeltsin | Violation of the Constitution | Impeachment is not adopted, as the vote for impeachment by the deputies failed to reach the 689 majority (617/689). |
| September 22, 1993 | Boris Yeltsin | Violation of the Constitution | Boris Yeltsin de jure was dismissed, and the performance of duties of the president have been entrusted to the vice president Alexander Rutskoy. However, Yeltsin de facto remained in office and declared the dissolution of the Supreme Soviet. Later, the conflict escalated into armed confrontation, which resulted in Yeltsin retaining his power. See 1993 Russian constitutional crisis |
| May 11–15, 1999 | Boris Yeltsin | Collapse of the Soviet Union; 1993 constitutional crisis; The outbreak of War in Chechnya; The weakening the country's defense; The genocide of the Russian people | Impeachment is not adopted, as none of the charges had achieved the required 300 votes. The charge which achieved the highest number of votes was that concerning the War in Chechnya, which obtained 283 votes. |

=== Number of deputies who voted in favour of the May 1999 impeachment proceedings, by factions ===
| Accusations | CPRF | LDPR | Our Home - Russia | Yabloko | Agro-Industrial Group | People's Power | Regions of Russia | Independents | Altogether |
|---|---|---|---|---|---|---|---|---|---|
| Belovezha Accords | 127 | 1 | 1 | 5 | 35 | 43 | 20 | 9 | 239 |
| Disbanding the Supreme Soviet | 128 | 2 | 0 | 24 | 35 | 43 | 22 | 9 | 263 |
| Chechen War | 128 | 1 | 1 | 37 | 35 | 42 | 22 | 12 | 283 |
| Weakening the defensive capabilities of the country | 127 | 2 | 2 | 3 | 35 | 43 | 20 | 9 | 241 |
| Genocide of the Russian people | 127 | 2 | 2 | 0 | 35 | 43 | 19 | 9 | 238 |
