= Barry Nalebuff =

American management professor (born 1958)

- Born: July 11, 1958 (age 68)

Academic background
- Education: MIT; University of Oxford

Academic work
- Discipline: Business strategy game theory
- Institutions: Yale School of Management; Princeton University
- Website: Information at IDEAS / RePEc

Barry J. Nalebuff (born July 11, 1958) is an American economist, businessman, business theorist, and writer. He is a Milton Steinbach Professor of Management at Yale School of Management and author who specializes in business strategy and game theory. His published books include Thinking Strategically and The Art of Strategy. Nalebuff's class on negotiation has nearly 700,000 active learners through Coursera and has the second-highest net promoter score on the platform. He has a semi-regular column in Forbes with Ian Ayres called "Why Not?"

Nalebuff also has multiple entrepreneurial ventures. He was a co-founder of Honest Tea and Kombrewcha. He serves on the board of Q Drinks (started by his former student Jordan Silbert), Calicraft Beer, and AGP Glass.

== Education ==
Nalebuff graduated in 1976 from the Belmont Hill School and in 1980 from MIT with degrees in economics and mathematics. He then earned his master's degree and doctorate in economics from Oxford University on a Rhodes Scholarship.

== Academic career ==
Prior to joining the faculty at Yale, Nalebuff was a member of the Harvard Society of Fellows and worked as an assistant professor at Princeton University.

== Books ==
- Nalebuff, Barry; Dixit, Avinash K. (1991). Thinking Strategically: The Competitive Edge in Business, Politics, and Everyday Life. New York: Norton. ISBN 978-0393029239.
- Nalebuff, Barry; Brandenburger, Adam M. (1996). Co-opetition: A Revolution Mindset that Combines Competition and Cooperation... The Game Theory Strategy that's Changing the Game of Business. Currency. ISBN 0385479492.
- Nalebuff, Barry; Kanbur, Ravi; Greenwald, Bruce; Richard, Arnott (2003). Economics for an Imperfect World: Essays in Honor of Joseph E. Stiglitz. Cambridge, Massachusetts: MIT Press. ISBN 978-0262012058.
- Nalebuff, Barry; Ayres, Ian (2003). Why Not? How to Use Everyday Ingenuity to Solve Problems Big and Small. Harvard Business School Press. ISBN 1591391539., ISBN 978-1422104347
- Nalebuff, Barry; Dixit, Avinash K. (2008). The Art of Strategy: A Game Theorist's Guide to Success in Business and Life. New York: W.W. Norton & Co. ISBN 978-0393062434.
- Nalebuff, Barry; Goldman, Seth (2013). Mission in a Bottle: The Honest Guide to Doing Business Differently—and Succeeding. New York: Crown Business. ISBN 9780770437497.
