= Tatyana Bek =

Russian poet, literary critic and literary scholar

Tatyana Bek in 1997

Tatyana Alexandrovna Bek (Russian: Татья́на Алекса́ндровна Бек; April 21, 1949, Moscow — February 7, 2005, Moscow) was a Russian poet, literary critic and literary scholar. She was a member of the Union of Soviet Writers (1978), and Russian PEN Center, and Secretary of the Moscow Writers' Union (1991-1995). She was the daughter of writer Alexander Bek.

In 1993, she signed the Letter of Forty-Two.

She died, according to the official version, from a massive heart attack, but many discussed the likelihood of suicide due to bullying by colleagues Yevgeny Rein, Mikhail Sinelnikov, Igor Shklyarevsky and literary critic Sergei Chuprinin.
