= Robert Pindyck =

American economist (born 1945)

- Born: January 5, 1945 (age 81)
- Citizenship: American
- Education: Massachusetts Institute of Technology (BS, MS, PhD)
- Occupation: Economist
- Employer: Massachusetts Institute of Technology

Robert Stephen Pindyck (/ˈpɪndaɪk/ PIN-dyke; born January 5, 1945) is an American economist, Bank of Tokyo-Mitsubishi Professor of Economics and Finance in the Sloan School of Management at the Massachusetts Institute of Technology. He is also a research associate with the National Bureau of Economic Research and a Fellow of the Econometric Society. He has also been a visiting professor at Tel-Aviv University, Harvard University, and Columbia University.

Pindyck's teaching and research focuses on market structure, financial economics, environmental, resource, and energy economics, the role of uncertainty on investment decisions and policy formulation, and economic policy generally.

== Education ==
Pindyck grew up in Mamaroneck, New York, and in 1962 graduated from Mamaroneck High School. He then went to M.I.T. where he did his undergraduate work, majoring in physics and electrical engineering, and received his bachelor's degree in 1966.

He went on to do his graduate work at M.I.T., where he completed a master's degree in electrical engineering in 1967 and a PhD in economics in 1971. His PhD dissertation dealt with the application of optimal control theory to the design of monetary and fiscal policy for macroeconomic stabilization. As part of his dissertation, he developed a ten-equation econometric model of the U.S. economy, for which he derived trajectories for the money supply and government spending that were optimal in the sense of keeping unemployment and inflation close to target levels.

== Teaching and Research ==
After finishing his PhD, Pindyck joined the faculty at the M.I.T. Sloan School of Management, where he has taught since 1971. He has won numerous teaching awards, including the Jamieson Prize for Excellence in Teaching. He taught courses in micro- and macro-economics, econometrics, industrial organization, and economic strategy.

After joining the M.I.T. faculty, Pindyck continued his research on applications of optimal control theory to economic policy, but later during the 1970s, his research interests turned to microeconomics. His early work focused on empirical studies of oil and natural gas markets and the effects of price regulation, and he wrote a book and several articles on world energy demand. He also studied the behavior and impact of cartels, especially in natural resource markets. He published several theoretical studies of resource exploration and depletion, including the role of uncertainty. Later, Pindyck studied futures markets and the behavior of commodity futures and spot prices. This included a recent study that showed how inventories link futures and spot prices, so that futures price speculation can have very limited (if any) impact on spot prices.

Much of Pindyck's work addressed the role and implications of uncertainty for market behavior, pricing, and production, and how various kinds of uncertainty affect irreversible investment decisions. With uncertainty, firms have options to make capital investments, and much of a firm's value can be attributed to the value of these options, even though many of them may never be exercised. Pindyck has shown how this option value depends on the nature and extent of the uncertainty, and how it can affect investment decisions and market structure. He has also shown how this concept of option value can also be applied to environmental policy, where there is uncertainty over potential (irreversible) environmental damage from pollution, but also uncertainty over future costs of abatement.

Much of Pindyck's work in environmental economics has focused on the economics of climate change. He has shown how uncertainty over future damages from climate change can affect policy decisions, such as the design of a carbon tax. Related to this, he has argued that large "Integrated Assessment Models" are of limited usefulness when applied to climate forecasting and the design of climate policy. In 2021, he completed a book on climate change, titled Climate Future: Averting and Adapting to Climate Change (Oxford University Press). The book explains what we know and don't know about climate change, argues that despite our best intentions and efforts temperatures are likely to rise substantially over the coming decades, and shows how forms of adaptation can be used to reduce the impact of warming.

Pindyck's most recent research has been related to how government policy can address potential global catastrophic events, such as major pandemics, nuclear or bio-terrorism, or a climate catastrophe. His work has shown how traditional cost-benefit analysis fails when applied to policies to avert potential catastrophes, and how the value of lost lives can be taken into account in analyses of catastrophic events.

== Publications ==
Pindyck is also the co-author of three textbooks. With Avinash Dixit, he wrote Investment Under Uncertainty (Princeton University Press, 1994; ISBN 0691034109), the first textbook exclusively about the real options approach to investments, and described as “a born-classic” in view of its importance to the theory. With Daniel L. Rubinfeld he is the author of two widely used textbooks, Microeconomics (9th Edition, Pearson, 2018; ISBN 9780134184241), and Econometric Models and Economic Forecasts (4th Edition, McGraw-Hill, 1998; ISBN 0079132928).
