= Letter of Forty-Two =

The Letter of Forty-Two (Russian: Письмо́ сорока́ двух) was an open letter signed by forty-two Russian literati, aimed at Russian society, the president and government, in reaction to the 1993 Russian constitutional crisis. It was published in the newspaper Izvestia on 5 October 1993 under the title "Writers demand decisive actions of the government."

== Contents ==
We have neither the desire nor the need to comment in detail on what happened in Moscow on 3 October. What happened was something that could only take place due to our and your stupidity and lack of concern — fascists took up arms, trying to seize power. Thank God, the army and the law enforcement organs were on the people's side, did not split, did not allow the bloody adventure to develop into fatal civil war, but what if?… We would have had no one to blame but ourselves. We "compassionately" begged after the August putsch not to "take revenge", not to "punish", not to "ban", not to "close down", not to "engage in a witch hunt". We very much wished to be good, magnanimous, tolerant. Good… Towards whom? Murderers? Tolerant… Towards what? Fascism?

The letter contains the following seven demands:

1. All kinds of сommunist and nationalist parties, fronts, and associations should be disbanded and banned by a decree of the President.
2. All illegal paramilitary and a fortiori armed groups and associations should be identified and disbanded (with bringing them to criminal responsibility when it is bound by a law).
3. Legislation providing for heavy sanctions for propaganda of fascism, chauvinism, racial hatred, for calls for violence and brutality should finally begin to work. Prosecutors, investigators, and judges patronizing such socially dangerous crimes should be immediately removed from their work.
4. The organs of the press, which from day to day inspire hatred, call for violence and are, in our opinion, one of the main organizers and perpetrators of the tragedy (and potential perpetrators of a multitude of future tragedies), such as Den, Pravda, Sovetskaya Rossiya, Literaturnaya Rossiya (as well as the television program 600 Seconds) and a number of others, should be closed until the judicial proceedings start.
5. The activities of bodies of the Soviet authority which refused to obey the legitimate authority of Russia should be suspended.
6. We all together must prevent the trial of the organizers and participants of the bloody drama in Moscow from becoming similar to that shameful farce which is called "the trial of the Gang of Eight."
7. Recognize not only the Congress of People's Deputies, the Supreme Soviet but also all bodies (including the Constitutional Court) formed by them as nonlegitimate.

== Criticism ==
Newspaper Pravda reacted by publishing a letter by three Soviet dissidents – Andrey Sinyavsky, Vladimir Maximov and Pyotr Abovin-Yegides – calling for Boris Yeltsin's immediate resignation. It said among other things:

...Let us not forget that this tragedy had been triggered by the President's decree. The question arises: was the head of the State so short-sighted as to fail to foresee this decree's consequences when he chose to defy the very same law that had enabled him to become President? How much of short-sightedness is there in it, and how much calculation? And this calculation – shouldn't it be called provocation in real terms?

Nezavisimaya Gazeta's 2nd editor-in-chief Victoria Shokhina, mentioning Vasily Aksyonov's statement ("It was right those bastards had been bombarded. Should I have been in Moscow, I'd have signed [the letter] too"), on 3 October 2004, wondered how "all of those 'democratic' writers who were preaching humanism and denouncing capital punishment" all of a sudden "came to applaud mass execution without trial". According to Shokhina, writer Anatoly Rybakov, when asked, 'would he have signed it', replied: "By no means. A writer can not endorse bloodshed". "But people like Rybakov are few and far between in our 'democratic' camp, and such people there are being disliked", Shokhina remarked.

== Support ==
A letter entitled "An appeal of the democratic public of Moscow to the President of Russia B. N. Yeltsin" ("Обращение собрания демократической общественности Москвы к президенту России Б.Н. Ельцину") was published on 8 October 1993, echoing key demands of the Letter of Forty-Two.

== Signatories ==
1. Ales Adamovich
2. Anatoly Ananyev
3. Viktor Astafiyev
4. Аrtyom Anfinogenov
5. Bella Akhmadulina
6. Grigory Baklanov
7. Zori Balayan
8. Tatyana Bek
9. Alexander Borshchagovsky
10. Vasil Bykaŭ
11. Boris Vasilyev
12. Alexander Gelman
13. Daniil Granin
14. Yuri Davydov
15. Daniil Danin
16. Andrei Dementyev
17. Mikhail Dudin
18. Alexander Ivanov
19. Edmund Iodkovsky
20. Rimma Kazakova
21. Sergey Kaledin
22. Yury Karyakin
23. Yakov Kostyukovsky
24. Tatyana Kuzovlyova
25. Alexander Kushner
26. Yuri Levitansky
27. Dmitry Likhachov
28. Yuri Nagibin
29. Andrey Nuykin
30. Bulat Okudzhava
31. Valentin Oskotsky
32. Grigory Pozhenyan
33. Anatoly Pristavkin
34. Lev Razgon
35. Alexander Rekemchuk
36. Robert Rozhdestvensky
37. Vladimir Savelyev
38. Vasily Selyunin
39. Yuri Chernichenko
40. Andrey Chernov
41. Marietta Chudakova
42. Mikhail Chulaki
