= Thinking Strategically =

1991 book by Avinash Dixit and Barry Nalebuff

Thinking Strategically: The Competitive Edge in Business, Politics, and Everyday Life
- Softcover edition
- Author: Avinash Dixit, Barry Nalebuff
- Language: English
- Subject: Strategy, game theory, decision making
- Genre: Non-fiction
- Publisher: W. W. Norton & Company
- Publication date: February 1, 1991
- Publication place: United States
- Media type: Print, e-book
- Pages: 393 pp.
- ISBN: 978-0393029239

Thinking Strategically: The Competitive Edge in Business, Politics, and Everyday Life is a non-fiction book by Indian-American economist Avinash Dixit and Barry Nalebuff, a professor of economics and management at Yale School of Management. The text was initially published by W. W. Norton & Company on February 1, 1991.

== Overview ==
The book discusses issues of strategic behaviour, decision making, and game theory. The authors present the main concepts, such as backward induction, auction theory, Nash equilibrium, noncooperative bargaining, to a general audience. Each concept is illustrated by examples from common life, business, sports, politics, etc.—as applying game theory to real life may be the best way of crystallizing the best options available.

== Reception ==
Today our writers and critics nominate the books they have enjoyed reading most over the last twelve months. No rules were imposed but, as you will see, all have been encouraged to be adventurous and broaden their interests away from their usual subjects Thinking Strategically by Avinash Dixit & Barry Nalebuff (W W Norton) offers essential training in making choices and weighing possibilities not only in business but in daily life. Reading it is a trip to the gym for the reasoning faculties. It presents game theory and business strategy as understandable, usable and everyday tools for living with others. Its examples of tactics in action range from King Lear to Maradonna. And the case studies make great bit-reading in queues or waiting-rooms. I also much enjoyed Howard Rheingold's Virtual Reality (Secker & Warburg), which describes the computer-created world waiting around the corner of the century, and Simon Schama's Dead Certainties (Granta), which sent a bright spark between history and fiction: illuminating.

—Review by Financial Times

== See also ==
- 1984 Orange Bowl
- Co-Opetition: A Revolution Mindset that Combines Competition and Cooperation also co-authored by Barry Nalebuff
- Coordination game
- Tragedy of the commons
- Thinking, Fast and Slow
