= Anatoly Pristavkin =

Russian writer and public figure

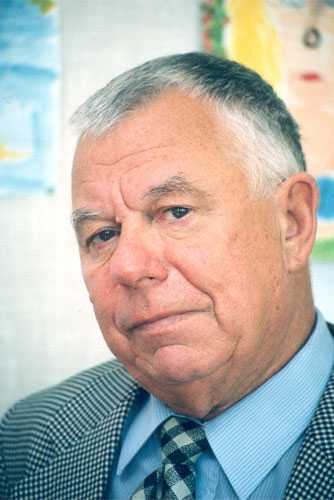

Anatoly Ignatovich Pristavkin (Russian: Анато́лий Игна́тьевич Приста́вкин, 17 October 1931 – 11 July 2008) was a Russian writer and public figure.

His mother died when he was nine and his father died in World War II. After spending several years in Soviet orphanages, Pristavkin had to start working from the age of 14, and had various jobs. He started a career as a writer in 1961 and later became a lecturer at a university. Pristavkin's novel "The Inseparable Twins" was successful in the Soviet Union, and describes the miserable conditions of orphans' life in an orphanage near Moscow during the years of World War II and the re-settlement to Chechnya in 1944, as Chechens had been deported. The book became part of school curriculum in the Perestroika-era USSR. Books by Pristavkin were translated into many languages.

Pristavkin took part in the Soviet opposition movement. In 1988, he joined the writers association Aprel, a pro-Perestroika organization of Russian writers. On 4 November 1989 he took part in the Alexanderplatz demonstration in East Berlin against the regime in East Germany. In 1991 he supported the Latvian independence movement, stood at barricades in Riga and appealed to Soviet soldiers via regional television, urging them not to shoot at civilians. In 1995 and 1996 he visited Chechnya and encountered assaults on civilian population. He later criticised Russia's Chechnya policies in the media.

In the 1990s, Pristavkin headed the Pardon Commission of the Russian Federation. In 1993, he signed the Letter of Forty-Two in support of Boris Yeltsin in his stand against the Russian parliament.

== Sources ==
- http://www.penrussia.org/n-z/an-prs.htm
- http://www.iht.com/articles/2008/07/20/europe/obits.php
