= Merle Goldman =

American historian of modern China (1931–2023)

- Born: Merle Dorothy Rosenblatt; March 12, 1931; New Haven, Connecticut, U.S.
- Died: November 16, 2023 (aged 92); Cambridge, Massachusetts, U.S.
- Other names: Chinese: 戈德曼; Pinyin: Ge Démàn
- Education: Harvard University; Radcliffe College; Sarah Lawrence College
- Known for: Histories of Chinese intellectuals and democracy
- Spouse: Marshall Goldman (m. 1953; died 2017)
- Children: 4
- Scientific career
- Workplaces: Boston University; Wellesley College
- Academic advisors: Benjamin I. Schwartz; John King Fairbank

Merle Dorothy Rosenblatt Goldman (March 12, 1931 – November 16, 2023) was an American historian and sinologist of modern China. She was professor of history at Boston University, especially known for a series of studies on the role of intellectuals under the rule of Mao Zedong and on the possibilities for democracy and political rights in present-day China.

== Background ==
Merle Dorothy Rosenblatt was born in New Haven, Connecticut, in 1931. Her mother and father were Jewish immigrants from Belarus and Romania, respectively. She graduated from Sarah Lawrence College in 1953, then took a master's degree from Radcliffe College in 1957. She then went on for a Ph.D. at Harvard University, which she received in 1964 in History and Far Eastern Languages, studying with Benjamin I. Schwartz and John King Fairbank. Fairbank, she later recalled, supported her in her own interests, which were quite different from his.

=== Personal life ===
In 1953, she married economist Marshall Goldman; they had four children and were married until his death in 2017.

Goldman died from Merkel cell carcinoma at her home in Cambridge, Massachusetts, on November 16, 2023, at the age of 92.

== Career ==
Goldman was an instructor at Wellesley College during 1963–1964, then taught in the History Department of Boston University from 1972 until her retirement in 2001. During those years she was Research Associate of the East Asian Research Center, which became the Fairbank Center for East Asian Research, at Harvard University, becoming a member of the Executive Committee in 1967 and serving to the present.

Among her honors, grants and memberships are Radcliffe Graduate Medal for Distinguished Achievement, June 1981; Guggenheim Memorial Foundation Fellowship, 1987–1988; American Council of Learned Societies; the Social Science Research Council; Wang Institute Post-Doctoral Fellowship in Chinese Studies, 1984–85. She was a member of the United States delegation to the UN Commission on Human Rights (1993–94); Editorial Board, China Quarterly.

=== Scholarly contributions ===
Goldman, as historian Perry Link observes, began by studying the adversarial relations between writers and the Party leadership, both of whom assumed that "literature, morality, and politics are closely intertwined -- indeed little more than different aspects of essentially the same thing." Goldman's doctoral dissertation, which became her first book, Literary Dissent in Communist China, dealt with the formative period when the Chinese Communist Party under Mao Zedong was centered at Yan'an in the 1940s. Party policy toward intellectuals was governed by Mao's "Talks At the Yan'an Forum", which required intellectuals to "serve the people" rather than pursue "art for art's sake." The book describes the emergence of Zhou Yang as the Party bureaucrat dealing with culture and intellectual life. Zhou orchestrated the campaigns that set up control of intellectuals. These included Ding Ling, a woman writer who was eventually forgiven for her frank descriptions of the Party's mistreatment of women, and Wang Shiwei, who was accused of plotting the overthrow the Party because it did not allow free expression and who was eventually executed. Goldman's book was widely praised and widely cited, but some also pointed out that it made "little acknowledgment" of the "often strong differences among writers" and that "the complete focus was on the negative impact of party's attempts to control literature." "All that mattered," said one critic, "was that writers were seeking freedom and it was being denied."

The meaning of "dissent" and the role of intellectuals and the state changed in Goldman's next books as she and her colleagues explored the continuities between 20th century intellectuals and the imperial past. Anthony Kane concluded that the title of her 1986 China's Intellectuals: Advise and Dissent pointed to this change. The earlier works, Kane says, were interested in the "negative," that is, dissenters as "Western-style creative spirits rebelling against party control." The new work expanded the concept of dissent to include the "active advisory role [intellectuals] have traditionally played and are increasingly playing again," a role which grows from a "literati tradition of qingyi (pure opinion) that dates back to traditional China." This exploration was further developed in a conference volume Goldman co-edited with Carol Hamrin, and Timothy Cheek, China's Intellectuals and the State (1986) which worked with the concept of China's "establishment intellectuals." The "establishment intellectual," like the scholar-bureaucrat of traditional China, remonstrated with rulers whose basic good intentions and legitimacy they accepted.

In the 1980s and 1990s, a time when Goldman could finally travel in China, she worked to encourage the forces for human rights and democracy there and joined the board of Human Rights Watch. In his review of her 1994 book, Sowing the Seeds of Democracy in China: Political Reform in the Deng Xiaoping Decade in the Sunday New York Times Book Review, Jonathan Mirsky wrote that the book centers first on "the democratic elite," the well-educated and well-connected Beijing intellectuals who are Party members or friendly to it, but who were its victims in one way or another. When Mao died in 1976, they looked forward to reforms that would be of benefit to them and to China (Mirsky adds that "Chinese intellectuals tend to be patriotic"). Hu Yaobang became their protector, but his removal from power in 1987 left them at the mercy of Party conservatives. Goldman interviewed the journalist Liu Binyan, who wrote loyal criticism of the government, and playwright Bai Hua, who wrote a scenario for the 1981 movie "Unrequited Love" for which he was severely criticized. She reported that Bai compared his situation with the ancient poet Qu Yuan, who remonstrated with his ruler to no avail, then drowned himself rather than rebel. This group remained basically loyal to the Party even while criticizing it. The other group in the book are younger and politically active, such as Wang Juntao and Chen Ziming. After the Tiananmen Square protests of 1989, Party leaders viewed them as dangerous and they were each sentenced to jail for 13 years. Mirsky comments that Goldman's detailed coverage and analysis of the movement toward democracy "makes the faintly hopeful closing words..., that the seeds 'may someday truly flower,' sound faint indeed."

Goldman was active in her community and the New England China world. Her support for younger scholars was demonstrated by the energy she put into conferences that featured their work and resulted in conference volumes, among which are Modern Chinese Literature in the May Fourth Era (1977), China's Intellectuals and the State: In Search of a New Relationship in the People's Republic of China (1987), and for many years she organized the New England China Seminar, at which scholars exchanged work and informal views. Colleagues at the Fairbank Center also recalled her as a pathbreaker at a time when few women entered the China field. For instance, as a young scholar, she wrote to say that she would be unable to attend a conference because she was due to give birth on that date; the organizer, a senior male, replied that "it is your wife, not you, who will be giving birth. Come to the conference!"

China: A New History (1992) was the last book by her mentor, John King Fairbank, who finished the manuscript but died before it could be published. The work was edited and seen through the press by Goldman's long-time friend and colleague Paul Cohen. When the time came for a new edition, Goldman herself added a chapter on developments in China since the first edition, and she is listed as co-author.

== Selected publications ==
Goldman's publications include more than fifty scholarly articles in addition to articles for the general public in the New York Review of Books, New York Times Book Review, The New Republic, and The Boston Globe.

Monographs

- Literary Dissent in Communist China, Harvard University Press, 1967; Atheneum paperback, 1970
- —— (1981). China's Intellectuals: Advise and Dissent. Harvard University Press. ISBN 9780674119703. "Notable Book," The New York Times
- —— (1994). Sowing the Seeds of Democracy in China: Political Reform in the Deng Xiaoping Decade. Harvard University Press. ISBN 9780674830073.
- From Comrade to Citizen: The Struggle for Political Rights in China, Harvard University Press, 2007.
- Fairbank, John King; Goldman, Merle (2006). China: A New History. Cambridge, Mass.: Belknap Press of Harvard University Press. ISBN 0674018281.

Edited volumes

- Modern Chinese Literature in the May Fourth Era, Harvard University Press, 1977; paperback, 1985
- China's Intellectuals and the State: In Search of a New Relationship in the People's Republic of China, edited with an introduction, "Uncertain Change," Council on East Asian Publications, Harvard University, 1987
- Co-editor, Science and Technology in Post-Mao China, Council on East Asian Studies, Harvard University, 1989
- Ideas Across Cultures, Essays on Chinese Thought in Honor of Benjamin Schwartz, coedited and introduction written with Paul Cohen, Harvard University Press, 1990
- Fairbank Remembered, co-edited with Paul Cohen, Fairbank Center for East Asian Research, 1992
- The Paradox of China's Reforms, co-edited with Roderick MacFarquhar, Harvard University Press, 1999
- Historical Perspectives on Contemporary East Asia, co-edited, Harvard University Press, 2000
- Intellectual History of Modern China, co-edited with Leo Ou-fan Lee, Cambridge University Press, 2002
- Changing Meanings of Citizenship in Modern China, co-edited, Harvard University Press, 2002
- Chinese Intellectuals between State and Market, co-edited, (London; New York: Routledge, 2005 ISBN 1134341784)
- Grassroots Political Reform in Contemporary China, co-edited with Elizabeth Perry, Harvard University Press, 2007
