= Alexander Kushner =

Russian poet from Saint Petersburg (born 1936)

Alexander Semyonovich Kushner
- Александр Семёнович Кушнер
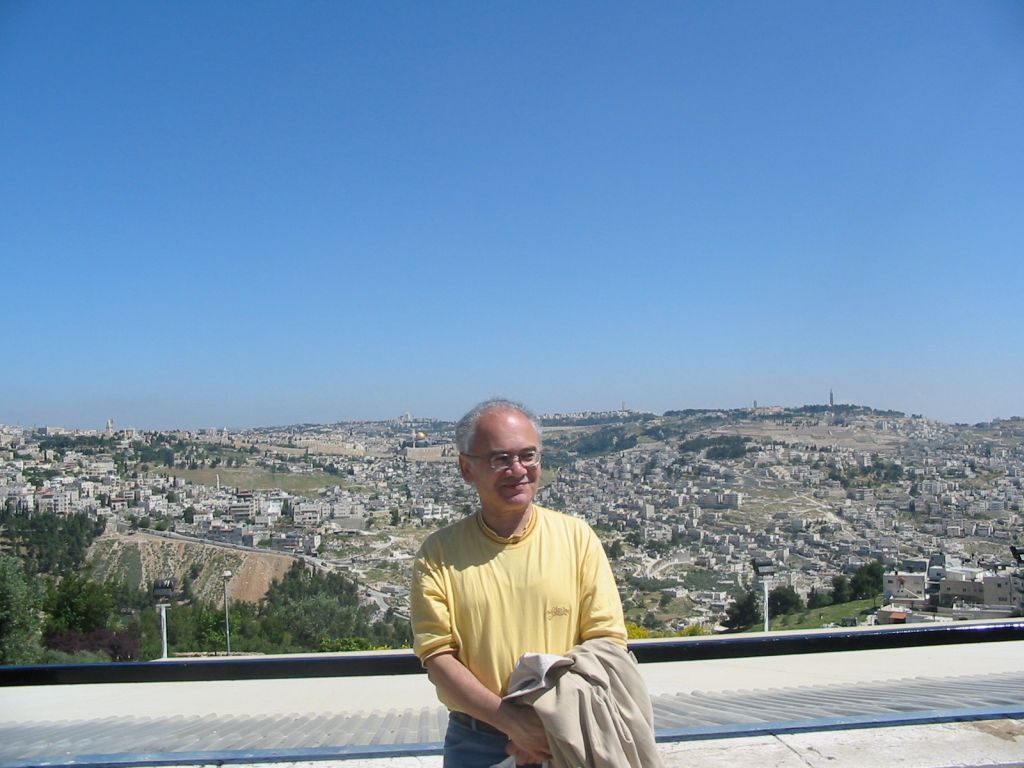
- Kushner on a visit in Jerusalem, 2005
- Born: 14 September 1936 (age 89); Leningrad, Soviet Union
- Citizenship: USSR, Russia
- Education: Russian language and literature school of teacher-training Leningrad Herzen University
- Occupations: Poet, previously school teacher of literature
- Writing career
- Language: Russian
- Movements: Neo-Acmeism, the Sixtiers

Alexander Semyonovich Kushner (Russian: Алекса́ндр Семёнович Ку́шнер) is a Russian poet from Saint Petersburg.

== Biography ==
Kushner was born in Leningrad into a Russian-Jewish family; his father was a naval engineer. Alexandr graduated from the Russian language and literature school of the city's teacher-training Herzen University, and later, between 1959 and 1969, taught Russian literature. After that, he became a full-time writer and poet. Since then he published about 15 collections of his poetry and two books of his essays. In 1965 he became a member of the Writers' Union, in 1987 joined the Russian PEN Center. He is also editor-in-chief of Biblioteka poeta (the "Library of the Poet" series). His only son Eugene and his family live in Israel.

In October 1993, he signed the Letter of Forty-Two.

His poetry resembles that of Acmeists. He usually doesn't write in free verse and seldom experiments or tries to elaborate a new poetic form, preferring to write in a classic, 19th century-like style. The Nobel Prize winner Brodsky once called Kushner "one of the best lyrical poets of the 20th century", adding that his name "is to stand in the line of names dear to the heart of every native Russian speaker"

Translations of Kushner's poetry into English, Italian and Dutch were published in book form; several poems were also translated to German, French, Japanese, Hebrew, Czech, and Bulgarian.

== Bibliography ==
=== Books of verse ===
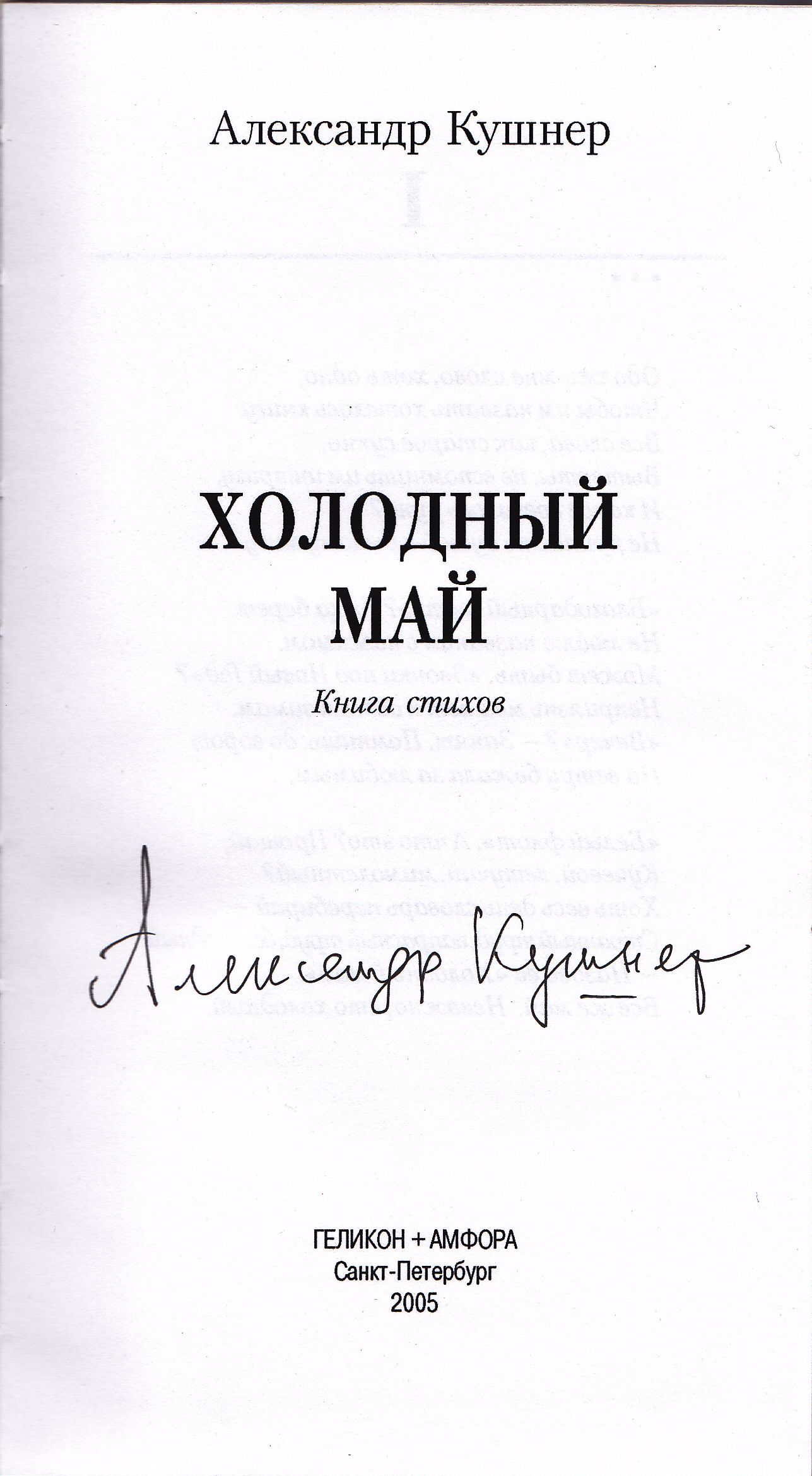
Autograph of Alexander Kushner

- The First Impression (Russian: Первое впечатление) 1962.
- The Night Watch (Russian: Ночной дозор) 1966.
- Omens (Russian: Приметы) 1969.
- The Writing (Russian: Письмо) 1974.
- The Direct Speech (Russian: Прямая речь) 1975.
- The Voice (Russian: Голос) 1978.
- Tavrichesky Garden (Russian: Таврический сад) 1984.
- Day Dreams (Russian: Дневные сны) 1986.
- The Fence Hedge (Russian: Живая изгородь) 1988.
- Night Music (Russian: Ночная музыка) 1991.
- On the Dark Star (Russian: На сумрачной звезде) 1994.
- The Milfoil (Russian: Тысячелистник) 1998.
- Bank of Clouds (Russian: Летучая гряда) 2000.
- Bushes (Russian: Кустарник) 2002.
- The Cold May (Russian: Холодный май) 2005.
- In the New Century (Russian: В новом веке) 2006.
- One Cannot Choose Times...(five decades) (Russian: Времена не выбирают (пять десятилетий)) 2007.
- Apollo in the Grass. 2015.

=== Works in prose ===
- Apollo under Snow (Russian: Аполлон в снегу)
- Wave and Stone (Russian: Волна и камень)
- The Fifth Element (selected verse and articles) (Russian: Пятая стихия)

== Awards ==
His numerous awards include the Russian National Award (1996) and the prestigious Pushkin Prize for poetry, bestowed on him by Russian president Vladimir Putin in 2001.

Also

- «North Palmira» (1995).
- Award of Novy Mir magazine (1997).
- Tepfer fond Pushkin award (1998).
- Award of Tsarskoe selo (2004).
- "Poet" award (2005).
