= Gold Peak Tea =

Iced tea brand

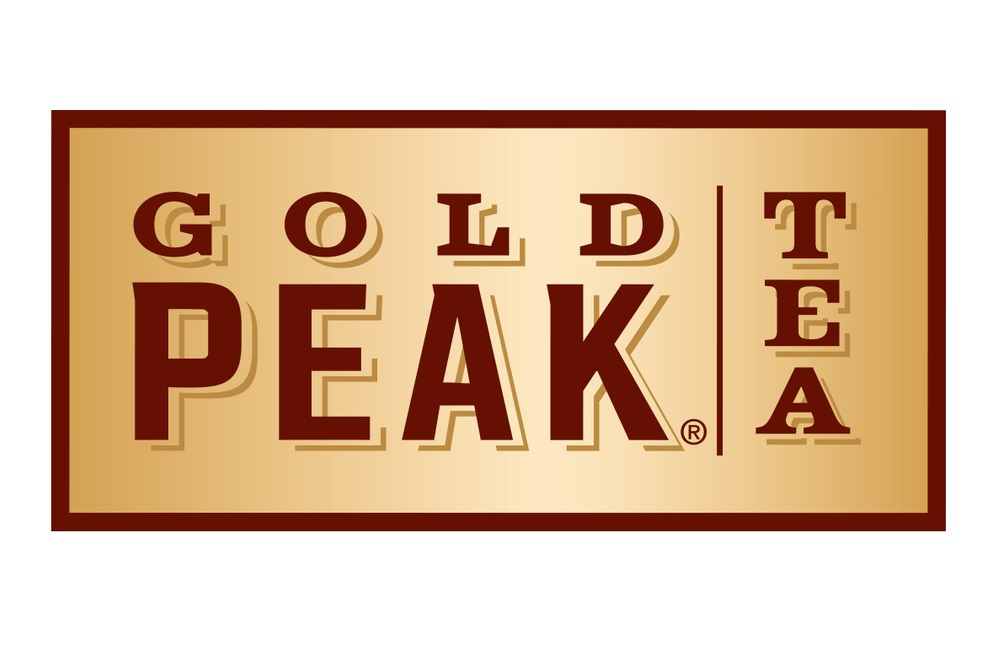
- Product type: Beverage
- Current owner: The Coca-Cola Company
- Country: United States
- Introduced: 2006
- Markets: US
- Tagline: "The taste that brings you home"
- Website: www.goldpeakbeverages.com

Gold Peak Tea is a brand of ready-to-drink iced tea manufactured by The Coca-Cola Company. It was first introduced in 2006 while a chilled version was launched in 2009. Past formulations of the product had won the ChefsBest award for best taste when it was made with tea leaves from the Kenyan Rift Valley. As of 2019, Gold Peak tea is no longer made from concentrate and is now brewed and bottled in their juice plants.

== Products ==
=== Sizes ===
The product, sold in plastic bottles, comes in an 18.5 fl. oz. individual size. The chilled version comes in both a 59-fl. oz. and an 89-fl. oz. multi-serve size. It was originally sold in glass bottles but was changed to plastic. Gold Peak launched a 64-oz sized bottle sold at room temperature in most grocery outlets. Some flavors are also available in 500-ml six-packs.

=== Flavors ===
- California Raisin Raspberry Tea
- Diet Tea
- Diet Green Tea
- Extra Sweet Tea
- Georgia Peach Tea
- Green Tea
- Lemon Tea
- Lemonade Tea
- Maine Blueberry Tea
- Slightly Sweet Tea
- Sweet Tea
- Unsweetened Tea
- Unsweetened Lemon Tea
- Unsweetened Raspberry Tea
- Zero Sugar Sweet Tea
