= Robert Helsley =

Business economist

- Born: Tennessee
- Citizenship: USA; Canada

Academic background
- Education: University of Oregon (BS), Princeton University (MA, PhD)

Academic work
- Discipline: Urban and public economics

Robert Helsley is a business economist, formerly the Dean of the Sauder School of Business, University of British Columbia (UBC), and also the university's Grosvenor Professor of Cities, Business Economics and Public Policy, and also a published author. Before his Dean position, he was Associate Dean of the UBC Centre for Real Estate and Urban Economics and Chair of Urban Land Economics, and in the United States, he was part of the University of California, Berkeley, as Professor and chair in Real Estate Development and the co-chair of the Fisher Center for Real Estate and Urban Economics.

== Early life and education ==
Helsley is a native of Oregon. He attended the University of Oregon for undergraduate studies. He graduated from that institution in 1979. He graduated with a B.S. in economics (Honors) and a B.S. in mathematics. Additionally, he attended Princeton University for his graduate studies and graduated in 1982 with a master's degree and in 1985 with a doctorate. He received an M.A. and Ph.D. in economics from Princeton.
