= Marshall Goldman =

American economist and writer

- Born: Marshall Irwin Goldman; July 26, 1930; Elgin, Illinois, U.S.
- Died: August 2, 2017 (aged 87); Cambridge, Massachusetts, U.S.

Academic background
- Education: University of Pennsylvania (BS); Harvard University (MA, PhD)

Academic work
- Institutions: Wellesley College

Marshall Irwin Goldman (July 26, 1930 – August 2, 2017) was an American economist and writer. He was an expert on the economy of the former Soviet Union. Goldman was a professor of economics at Wellesley College and associate director of the Harvard Russian Research Center. Goldman was well known for his study of the career of Mikhail Gorbachev. His books on the former Soviet Union include The USSR in Crisis: The Failure of an Economic System, Lost Opportunity: What Has Made Economic Reform in Russia So Difficult, and Petrostate.

== Education ==
Goldman was a 1952 graduate of the Wharton School of the University of Pennsylvania and received M.A. and Ph.D. degrees in Russian studies and economics from Harvard University in 1956 and 1961, respectively. He was awarded an honorary Doctor of Laws degree from the University of Massachusetts, Amherst, in 1985.

== Career ==
Goldman was Kathryn Wasserman Davis Professor of Russian Economics (Emeritus) at Wellesley College. An expert on the Russian economy and the economics of high technology, he joined the Wellesley faculty in 1958. In 1998, the Wellesley College Alumnae Association awarded him its first Faculty Service Award. He was also associate director of the Davis Center for Russian Studies at Harvard University from 1975 to 2006.

Goldman was known for his study and analysis of the careers of Mikhail Gorbachev and Boris Yeltsin. He was the author of over a dozen books on the former Soviet Union. A frequent visitor to the republics of the former Soviet Union, Goldman was present during the August 1991 coup attempt. He met with Mikhail Gorbachev, Vladimir Putin, and former Presidents George H. W. Bush and George W. Bush, as well as business leaders, diplomats, and government officials at the highest levels in both countries.

Goldman taught American economics to students and general audiences while a Fulbright-Hays Lecturer at Moscow State University in 1977; and in 1980s, he was invited by the U.S. Ambassador to the former Soviet Union to deliver a series of lectures on behalf of the U.S. Government. He also spoke on several invitational tours in China and lectured throughout Western Europe and Asia.

He was a consulting editor to the journal Current History. He wrote for publications as Current History, Foreign Affairs, The New York Times, The Washington Post, and The Harvard Business Review. His articles also appeared in The New Yorker, The Atlantic Monthly, and Science, and he was a frequent guest on CNN and Good Morning America. He appeared on The MacNeil/Lehrer NewsHour, Crossfire, Face the Nation, The Today Show, and Nightline. He wrote regularly for the Russian newspapers, Moscow News and The Moscow Times, and was often heard on National Public Radio.

In 1991, Goldman was elected a Fellow of the American Academy of Arts and Sciences. He was a consultant to the State Department, the Environmental Protection Agency, the Council on Environmental Quality, the Ford Foundation, and numerous corporations. A director of the Century Bank and Trust Company, the Jamestown Foundation, and Trustee of Northeast Investors, Goldman was a member of the Council on Foreign Relations and the American Economic Association. Goldman served as a trustee of the Noble and Greenough School as well as The Commonwealth School of Boston and was past president of the Hillel Council of Greater Boston. He was also past president of the early music group Boston Baroque. A longtime resident of Wellesley, Massachusetts, Marshall Goldman was an elected member of the Wellesley Town Meeting and also served on the town's Conservation Commission as well as the Incinerator Study Committee.

== Controversy ==
On April 19, 2013, Goldman appeared on WCBV Boston 5 News commenting on the pursuit/capture of the suspects involved in the Boston Marathon bombing. His comments angered many Southerners as he compared the terrorists to people from Kentucky and Tennessee who "hate the government and regulation and go around attacking everyone".

== Personal life ==
Goldman was married to Merle Goldman (b. March 21, 1931), a specialist on modern China and Professor Emerita of History at Boston University. He had four children.

== Publications ==
- The Spoils of Progress: Environmental Pollution in the Soviet Union (MIT 1972)
- U.S.S.R. in Crisis: The Failure of an Economic System (W.W. Norton, 1983)
- Gorbachev's Challenge: Economic Reform in the Age of High Technology (W.W. Norton, 1987)
- What Went Wrong with Perestroika: The Rise and Fall of Mikhail Gorbachev (W.W. Norton, 1991)
- Lost Opportunity: Why Economic Reforms in Russia Have Not Worked (W.W. Norton, 1994)
- Lost Opportunity: What Has Made Economic Reform in Russia So Difficult (Norton, 1996)
- The Piratization of Russia: Russian Reform Goes Awry (Routledge, 2003).
- Petrostate: Putin, Power and the New Russia (Oxford University Press, April 2008).
- Goldman, Marshall I. (1992). "Perestroika". In David R. Henderson (ed.). Concise Encyclopedia of Economics (1st ed.). Library of Economics and Liberty. OCLC 317650570, 50016270, 163149563
