= 1993 Russian constitutional crisis =

Conflict between Boris Yeltsin and the parliament

- Part of the conflicts in the former Soviet Union
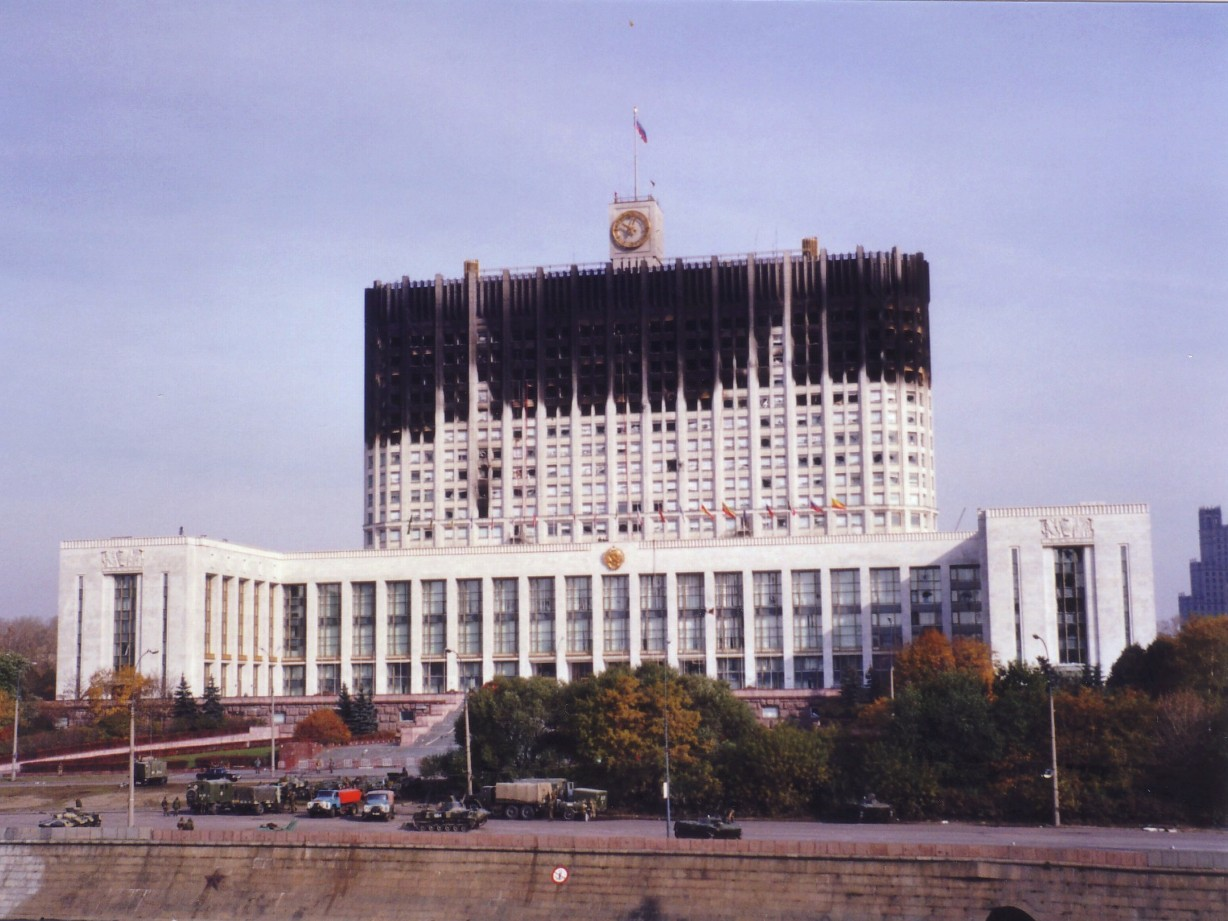
- The White House in October 1993, soon after the assault of government troops supported by tanks
Date	9 December 1992 – 4 October 1993 (9 months, 3 weeks and 4 days); Main phase: 21 September – 4 October 1993 (1 week and 6 days)
Location	Moscow, Russia
Result	Presidential victory; Presidential rule by decree imposed; New constitution adopted; Supreme Soviet, Congress of People's Deputies, regional and local Soviets disbanded; Creation of the Federal Assembly; New parliamentary election held; End of the Soviet system of government in Russia

Belligerents
(Russia) Presidential forces: Main Administration of Protection; Ministry of Internal Affairs; Police; Internal Troops; OMON; SOBR; Ministry of Defence; Kantemir Division; Taman Division; Government supporters: Pro-Yeltsin demonstrators and organizations; Democratic Russia; (Russia) Federalists and anti-communists	(Russia) Parliamentary forces: Congress of People's Deputies; Supreme Soviet; Anti-Yeltsin opposition: National Salvation Front; Russian National Unity; Labour Russia; Other opposition forces (Note: Supporters of Alexander Rutskoy, the Supreme Soviet and the Congress of People's Deputies frequently used those flags. The Russian tricolor itself only remained hoisted at the White House building (see video documentary Archived July 23, 2011, at the Wayback Machine).)

Commanders and leaders
(Russia) Boris Yeltsin (Russia) Viktor Chernomyrdin (Russia) Yegor Gaidar (Russia) Pavel Grachev (Russia) Viktor Yerin (Russia) Nikolai Golushko (Russia) Anatoly Kulikov (Russia) Alexander Korzhakov (Russia) Dmitri Volkogonov	(Russia) Alexander Rutskoy (Russia) Ruslan Khasbulatov (Russia) Vladislav Achalov (Russia) Andrey Dunayev (Russia) Viktor Barannikov; Sergey Baburin; Albert Makashov; Alexander Barkashov (Soviet Union) Viktor Anpilov

Political support
Liberals Federalists Anti-communists (Commonwealth of Independent States) CIS United States (European Union) European Community NATO	Communists Nationalists Monarchists Russian National Unity National Bolsheviks Transnistria

Casualties and losses
- 147 killed, 437 wounded (official assessment of the Prosecutor-General of Russia)
- Became Acting President of Russia after the impeachment of Yeltsin, in accordance with the Constitution.

In September and October 1993, following the increasingly visible tensions after December 1992, a constitutional crisis arose in the Russian Federation from a conflict between the then Russian president Boris Yeltsin and the country's parliament. Yeltsin performed a self-coup, dissolving parliament and instituting a presidential rule by decree system. The crisis ended with Yeltsin using military force to attack Moscow's House of Soviets and arrest the lawmakers. In Russia, the events are known as the "October Coup" (Russian: Октябрьский путч, romanized: Oktyabr'skiy putch) or "Black October" (Чëрный октябрь, Chornyi Oktyabr').

With the dissolution of the Soviet Union in December 1991, the Russian Soviet Federative Socialist Republic turned into an independent country, the Russian Federation. The Soviet-era 1978 Russian constitution remained in effect, though it had been amended in April 1991 to install a president independent of the parliament. Boris Yeltsin, elected president in July 1991, began assuming increasing powers, leading to a political standoff with Russia's parliament, which in 1993 was composed of the Congress of People's Deputies and the Supreme Soviet. After holding a four-part referendum in April on support for his leadership and socio-economical policies, as well as on support for early elections, Yeltsin called for parliamentary elections and dissolved the legislature on 21 September in a move not authorized by the constitution, nor approved by the referendum.

On 23 September, the parliament (led by Supreme Soviet Chairman Ruslan Khasbulatov) impeached Yeltsin, proclaimed vice president Alexander Rutskoy the acting president, and barricaded itself in the White House building. Ten days of street fighting commenced between police and demonstrators loyal to Yeltsin and the parliamentarians. On 3 October, demonstrators removed militia cordons around the parliament and, urged by their leaders, took over the mayor's offices and tried to storm the Ostankino television centre. On 4 October, the army, which had remained neutral, shelled the White House using tanks and stormed the building with special forces on Yeltsin's orders, arresting the surviving leaders of the resistance. All of those involved in the events were later granted amnesty by the State Duma in February 1994 and released from jail.

At the climax of the crisis, Russia was thought by some to be "on the brink" of civil war. The ten-day conflict became the deadliest single event of street fighting in Moscow's history since the October Revolution; 147 people were killed and 437 wounded according to the official Russian government statistics. In the wake of the events, Yeltsin consolidated his position, further expanded the powers of the executive, and pushed through the adoption of the 1993 constitution of the Russian Federation.

== Origins ==
=== Intensifying executive–legislative power struggle ===
The Soviet Union was dissolved on 26 December 1991 and the Russian Soviet Federative Socialist Republic gained its independence as the Russian Federation. In Russia, Yeltsin's economic reform program took effect on 2 January 1992. Soon afterward, prices skyrocketed, government spending was slashed, and heavy new taxes went into effect. A deep credit crunch shut down many industries and led to a protracted depression. As a result, unemployment reached record levels. The program began to lose support, and the ensuing political confrontation between Yeltsin on one side, and the opposition to radical economic reform on the other, became increasingly centered in the two branches of government.

Real GDP percentage change in Russia
1990	1991	1992	1993	1994
−3.0%	−5.0%	−14.5%	−8.7%	−12.7%

Throughout 1992, opposition to Yeltsin's reform policies grew stronger and more intractable among bureaucrats concerned about the condition of Russian industry and among regional leaders who wanted more independence from Moscow. Russia's vice president, Alexander Rutskoy, denounced the Yeltsin program as "economic genocide". From 1991 to 1998, the first seven years of Yeltsin's incumbency, the Russian GDP (measured by purchasing power parity) went from over two trillion U.S. dollars annually to less than one and a quarter trillion U.S. per annum. The United States provided an estimated $2.58 billion of official aid to Russia during the eight years of Bill Clinton's presidency, to build a new economic system, and he encouraged American businesses to invest. Leaders of oil-rich republics such as Tatarstan and Bashkiria called for full independence from Russia.

President Boris Yeltsin at a session of the Supreme Soviet of the Russian Federation, presenting a report on his visits to the Western countries (United Kingdom, France, the United States and Canada) in February 1992

Also throughout 1992, Yeltsin wrestled with the Supreme Soviet (the standing legislature) and the Russian Congress of People's Deputies (the country's highest legislative body, from which the Supreme Soviet members were drawn) for control over government and government policy. In 1992 the speaker of the Russian Supreme Soviet, Ruslan Khasbulatov, came out in opposition to the reforms, despite claiming to support Yeltsin's overall goals.

The president was concerned about the terms of the constitutional amendments passed in late 1991, which meant that his special powers of decree were set to expire by the end of 1992 (Yeltsin expanded the powers of the presidency beyond normal constitutional limits in carrying out the reform program). Yeltsin, awaiting implementation of his privatization program, demanded that parliament reinstate his decree powers (only parliament had the authority to replace or amend the constitution). In the Russian Congress of People's Deputies and in the Supreme Soviet, the deputies refused to adopt a new constitution that would enshrine the scope of presidential powers demanded by Yeltsin into law.

Another cause of conflict was the repeated refusal of the Congress of People's Deputies to ratify the Belovezha Accords, which declared the dissolution of the USSR and created the Commonwealth of Independent States. The Congress also refused to remove references to the Constitution and laws of the USSR from the 1978 Constitution of the RSFSR.

==== Seventh Congress of People's Deputies ====
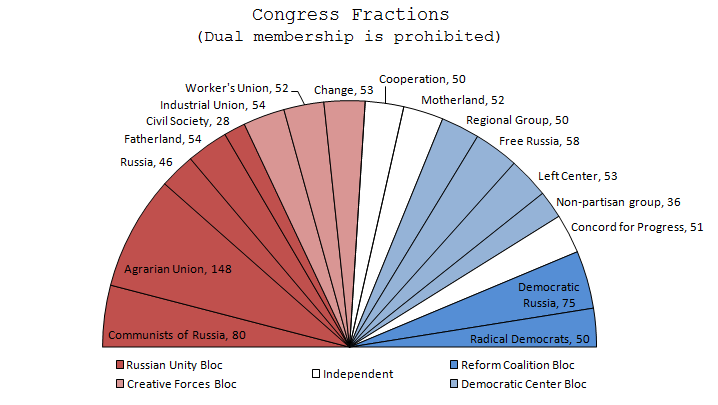
Congressional factions in December 1992

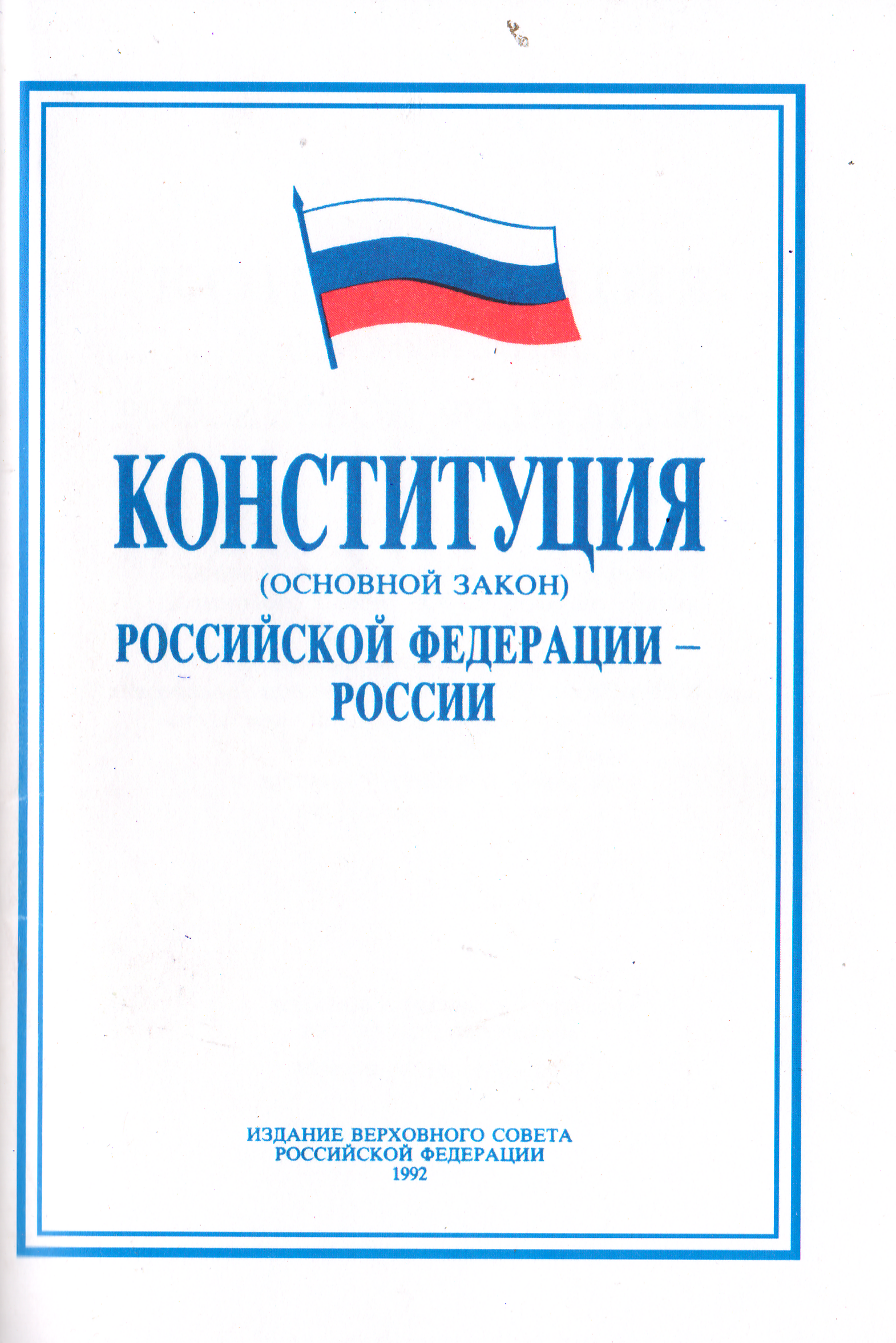
Cover of the Constitution of Russia 1992 edition of the Supreme Soviet of the Russian Federation

During its December session, the parliament clashed with Yeltsin on a number of issues, and the conflict came to a head on 9 December when the parliament refused to confirm Yegor Gaidar, the widely unpopular architect of Russia's "shock therapy" market liberalizations, as prime minister. The parliament refused to nominate Gaidar, demanding modifications of the economic program and directed the Central Bank, which was under the parliament's control, to continue issuing credits to enterprises to keep them from shutting down.

In an angry speech the next day on 10 December, Yeltsin accused the Congress of blocking the government's reforms and suggested the people decide on a referendum, "which course do the citizens of Russia support? The course of the President, a course of transformations, or the course of the Congress, the Supreme Soviet and its Chairman, a course towards folding up reforms, and ultimately towards the deepening of the crisis." Parliament responded by voting to take control of the army.

On 12 December, Yeltsin and parliament speaker Khasbulatov agreed on a compromise that included the following provisions: (1) a national referendum on framing a new Russian constitution to be held in April 1993; (2) most of Yeltsin's emergency powers were extended until the referendum; (3) the parliament asserted its right to nominate and vote on its own choices for prime minister; and (4) the parliament asserted its right to reject the president's choices to head the Defense, Foreign Affairs, Interior, and Security ministries. Yeltsin nominated Viktor Chernomyrdin to be prime minister on 14 December, and the parliament confirmed him.

Yeltsin's December 1992 compromise with the seventh Congress of the People's Deputies temporarily backfired. Early 1993 saw increasing tension between Yeltsin and the parliament over the language of the referendum and power sharing. In a series of collisions over policy, the congress whittled away the president's extraordinary powers, which it had granted him in late 1991. The legislature, marshaled by Khasbulatov, began to sense that it could block and even defeat the president. The tactic that it adopted was gradually to erode presidential control over the government. In response, the president called a referendum on a constitution for 11 April.

==== Eighth congress ====
The eighth Congress of People's Deputies opened on 10 March 1993, with a strong attack on the president by Khasbulatov, who accused Yeltsin of acting unconstitutionally. In mid-March, an emergency session of the Congress of People's Deputies voted to amend the constitution, strip Yeltsin of many of his powers, and cancel the scheduled April referendum, again opening the door to legislation that would shift the balance of power away from the president. The president stalked out of the congress. Vladimir Shumeyko, first deputy prime minister, declared that the referendum would go ahead, but on 25 April.

The parliament was gradually expanding its influence over the government. On 16 March, the president signed a decree that conferred Cabinet rank on Viktor Gerashchenko, chairman of the central bank, and three other officials; this was in accordance with the decision of the eighth congress that these officials should be members of the government. The congress' ruling, however, had made it clear that as ministers they would continue to be subordinate to parliament. In general, the parliament's lawmaking activity decreased in 1993, as its agenda increasingly became dominated by efforts to increase the parliamentarian powers and reduce those of the president.

==== "Special regime" ====
The president's response was dramatic. On 20 March, Yeltsin addressed the nation directly on television, declaring that he had signed a decree on a "special regime" (Об особом порядке управления до преодоления кризиса власти), under which he would assume extraordinary executive power pending the results of a referendum on the timing of new legislative elections, on a new constitution, and on public confidence in the president and vice-president. Yeltsin also bitterly attacked the parliament, accusing the deputies of trying to restore the Soviet-era order.

Soon after Yeltsin's televised address, Valery Zorkin (Chairman of the Constitutional Court of the Russian Federation), Yuri Voronin (first vice-chairman of the Supreme Soviet), Alexander Rutskoy and Valentin Stepankov (Prosecutor-General) made an address, publicly condemning Yeltsin's declaration as unconstitutional. On 23 March, although not yet possessing the signed document, the Constitutional Court ruled that some of the measures proposed in Yeltsin's TV address were unconstitutional; however, the decree itself, that was only published a few days later, did not contain unconstitutional steps.

==== Ninth congress ====
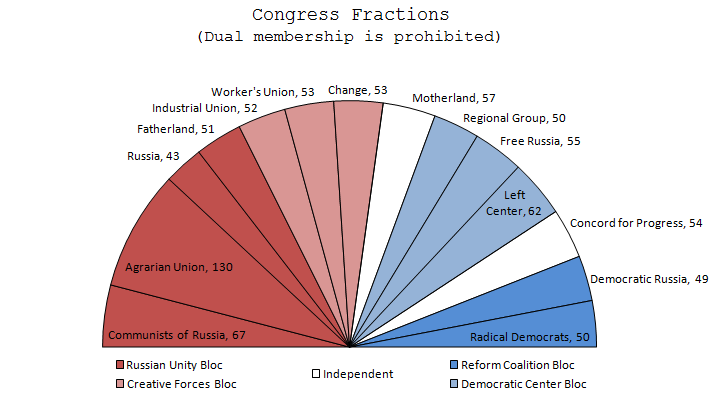
Congressional factions in March 1993

The ninth congress, which opened on 26 March, began with an extraordinary session of the Congress of People's Deputies taking up discussions of emergency measures to defend the constitution, including impeachment of President Yeltsin. Yeltsin conceded that he had made mistakes and reached out to swing voters in parliament. Yeltsin narrowly survived an impeachment vote on March 28, votes for impeachment falling 72 short of the 689 votes needed for a 2/3 majority. The similar proposal to dismiss Ruslan Khasbulatov, the chairman of the Supreme Soviet was defeated by a wider margin (339 in favour of the motion), though 614 deputies had initially been in favour of including the re-election of the chairman in the agenda, a tell-tale sign of the weakness of Khasbulatov's own positions (517 votes for would have sufficed to dismiss the speaker).

By the time of the ninth Congress, the legislative branch was dominated by the joint communist–nationalist Russian Unity bloc, which included representatives of the CPRF and the Fatherland faction (communists, retired military personnel, and other deputies of a socialist orientation), Agrarian Union, and the Russia faction led by Sergey Baburin. These groups, together with more centrist groups like Change (Смена), left the opposing bloc of Yeltsin supporters (Democratic Russia and Radical Democrats) in a clear minority.

==== National referendum ====
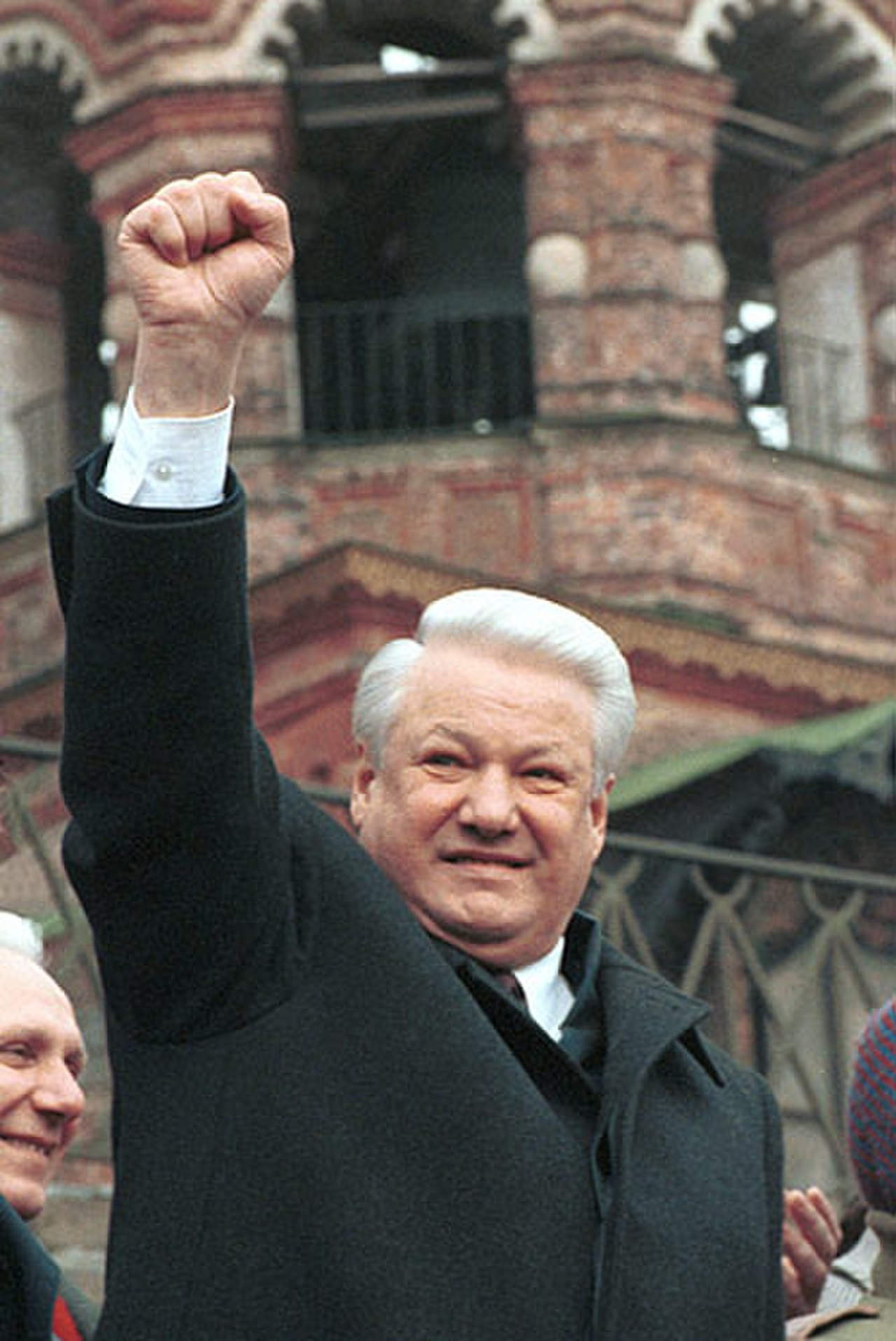
Yeltsin speaking at a meeting of his supporters on 28 March 1993

The referendum would go ahead, but since the impeachment vote failed, the Congress of People's Deputies sought to set new terms for a popular referendum. The legislature's version of the referendum asked whether citizens had confidence in Yeltsin, approved of his reforms, and supported early presidential and legislative elections. The parliament voted that in order to win, the president would need to obtain 50 percent of the whole electorate, rather than 50 percent of those actually voting, to avoid an early presidential election. This time, the Constitutional Court supported Yeltsin and ruled that the president required only a simple majority on two issues: confidence in him, and economic and social policy; he would need the support of half the electorate in order to call new parliamentary and presidential elections.

On 25 April, a majority of voters expressed confidence in the president, and called for new legislative elections. Yeltsin termed the results a mandate for him to continue in power. Before the referendum, Yeltsin had promised to resign, if the electorate failed to express confidence in his policies. Although this permitted the president to declare that the population supported him, not the parliament, Yeltsin lacked a constitutional mechanism to implement his victory. As before, the president had to appeal to the people over the heads of the legislature.

On 1 May, antigovernment protests organized by the hardline opposition turned violent. Numerous deputies of the Supreme Soviet took part in organizing the protest and in its course. One OMON police officer suffered fatal injuries during the riot. As a reaction, a number of the representatives of Saint Petersburg intelligentsia (e.g., Oleg Basilashvili, Aleksei German, Boris Strugatsky) sent a petition to president Yeltsin, urging "putting an end to the street criminality under political slogans".

=== Constitutional convention ===
On 29 April 1993, Boris Yeltsin released the text of his proposed constitution to a meeting of government ministers and leaders of the republics and regions, according to ITAR-TASS. On 12 May Yeltsin called for a special assembly of the Federation Council, which had been formed 17 July 1990 within the office of the Chairman of the Supreme Soviet of the Russian SFSR, and other representatives, including political leaders from a wide range of government institutions, regions, public organizations, and political parties, to finalize a draft for a new constitution from 5–10 June, and was followed by a similar decree 21 May.

After much hesitation, the Constitutional Committee of the Congress of People's Deputies decided to participate and present its own draft constitution. Of course, the two main drafts contained contrary views of legislative–executive relations. Some 700 representatives at the conference ultimately adopted a draft constitution on 12 July that envisaged a bicameral legislature and the dissolution of the congress. But because the convention's draft of the constitution would dissolve the congress, there was little likelihood that the congress would vote itself out of existence. The Supreme Soviet immediately rejected the draft and declared that the Congress of People's Deputies was the supreme lawmaking body and hence would decide on the new constitution.

=== July–September ===
The parliament was active in July–August, while the president was on vacation, and passed a number of decrees that revised economic policy, in order to "end the division of society", It also launched investigations of key advisers of the president, accusing them of corruption. The president returned in August and declared that he would deploy all means, including circumventing the constitution, to achieve new parliamentary elections.

In July, the Constitutional Court of the Russian Federation confirmed the election of Pyotr Sumin to head the administration of the Chelyabinsk Oblast, something that Yeltsin had refused to accept. As a result, a situation of dual power existed in that region from July to October in 1993, with two administrations claiming legitimacy simultaneously. Another conflict involved the decision of the Constitutional Court regarding the regional presidency in Mordovia. The court delegated the question of legality of abolishing the post of the region's president to the Constitutional Court of Mordovia. As a result, popularly elected President Vasily Guslyannikov, member of the pro-Yeltsin Democratic Russia movement, lost his position. Thereafter, the state news agency (ITAR-TASS) ceased to report on a number of Constitutional Court decisions.

The Supreme Soviet also tried to further foreign policies that differed from Yeltsin's line. Thus, on 9 July 1993, it passed resolutions on Sevastopol, "confirming the Russian federal status" of the city. Ukraine saw its territorial integrity at stake and filed a complaint to the Security Council of the UN. Yeltsin condemned the resolution of the Supreme Soviet. In August 1993, a commentator reflected on the situation as follows: "The President issues decrees as if there were no Supreme Soviet, and the Supreme Soviet suspends decrees as if there were no President." (Izvestiya, August 13, 1993).

The president launched his offensive on 1 September when he attempted to suspend Vice President Rutskoy, a key adversary. Rutskoy, elected on the same ticket as Yeltsin in 1991, was the president's automatic successor. A presidential spokesman said that he had been suspended because of "accusations of corruption", due to alleged corruption charges, which was not further confirmed. On 3 September, the Supreme Soviet rejected Yeltsin's suspension of Rutskoy and referred the question to the Constitutional Court.

Two weeks later, Yeltsin declared that he would agree to call early presidential elections provided that the parliament also called elections. The parliament ignored him. On 18 September, Yeltsin then named Yegor Gaidar, who had been forced out of office by parliamentary opposition in 1992, a deputy prime minister and a deputy premier for economic affairs. This appointment was unacceptable to the Supreme Soviet.

== Siege and assault ==
Supreme Soviet session, 21 September 1993

On 21 September, Yeltsin declared the Congress of People's Deputies and the Supreme Soviet dissolved; this act was in contradiction with a number of articles of the Constitution of 1978 (as amended 1989–1993), such as, Article 121^{6} (Note: The Congress enabled this formerly-suspended amendment after it had failed to impeach Yeltsin after his declaration of a 'Special Rule' in March 1993) which stated:

The powers of the President of Russian Federation cannot be used to change the national and state organization of the Russian Federation, to dissolve or to interfere with the functioning of any elected organs of state power. In this case, his powers cease immediately.

In his television appearance to the citizens of Russia, President Yeltsin argued for the decree as follows:

Already for more than a year attempts were made to reach a compromise with the corps of deputies, with the Supreme Soviet. Russians know well how many steps were taken by my side during the last congresses and between them. ... The last days destroyed once and for all the hopes for a resurrection of at least some constructive cooperation. The majority of the Supreme Soviet is directly against the will of the Russian people. A course was taken in favour of the weakening of the president and ultimately his removal from office, of the disorganization of the work of the government; during the last months, dozens of unpopular decisions have been prepared and passed. ... Many of these were deliberately planned to worsen the situation in Russia. The more flagrant ones are the so-called economic policies of the Supreme Soviet, and its decisions on the budget and privatization; there are many others that deepen the crisis, cause colossal damage to the country. All attempts of the government undertaken to at least somewhat alleviate the economic situation are met with incomprehension. There is hardly a day when the cabinet of ministers is not harassed, its hands are not being tied. And this happens in a situation of a deepest economic crisis. The Supreme Soviet has stopped taking into account the decrees of the president, his amendments of the legislative projects, even his constitutional veto rights. Constitutional reform has practically been pared down. The process of creating rule of law in Russia has essentially been disorganized. On the contrary, what is going on is a deliberate reduction of the legal basis of the young Russian state, which is weak enough without this. The legislative work became a weapon of political struggle. Laws, that Russia urgently needs, are being delayed for years. ...

For a long time, most of the sessions of the Supreme Soviet take place with infringements of elementary procedures and order... A cleansing of committees and commissions is taking place. Everyone who does not show personal loyalty to its leader is being mercilessly expelled from the Supreme Soviet, from its presidium. ... This is all bitter evidence of the fact that the Supreme Soviet as a state institution is currently in a state of decay ... . The power in the Supreme Soviet has been captured by a group of persons who have turned it into an HQ of the intransigent opposition. ... The only way to overcome the paralysis of the state authority in the Russian Federation is its fundamental renewal on the basis of the principles of popular power and constitutionality. The constitution currently in force does not enable this. The constitution in force also does not provide for a procedure of passing a new constitution, that would provide for a worthy exit from the crisis of state power. I as the guarantor of the security of our state have to propose an exit from this deadlock, have to break this vicious circle.

At the same time, Yeltsin repeated his announcement of a constitutional referendum, and new legislative elections for December. He also repudiated the Constitution of 1978, declaring that it had been replaced with one that gave him extraordinary executive powers. According to the new plan, the lower house would have 450 deputies and be called the State Duma, the name of the Russian legislature before the Bolshevik Revolution in 1917. The Federation Council, which would bring together representatives from the 89 subdivisions of the Russian Federation, would assume the role of an upper house. Yeltsin claimed that by dissolving the Russian parliament in September 1993 he was clearing the tracks for a rapid transition to a functioning market economy. With this pledge, he received strong backing from the leading powers of the West. Yeltsin enjoyed a strong relationship with the Western powers, particularly the United States, but the relationship made him unpopular with many Russians. In Russia, the Yeltsin side had control over television, where hardly any pro-parliament views were expressed during the September–October crisis.

=== Parliament purports to impeach Yeltsin as president ===
Rutskoy called Yeltsin's move a step toward a coup d'état. The next day, the Constitutional Court held that Yeltsin had violated the constitution and could be impeached. During an all-night session, chaired by Khasbulatov, parliament declared the president's decree null and void. Rutskoy was proclaimed acting president until new elections. He dismissed the key ministers Pavel Grachev (defense), Nikolay Golushko (security), and Viktor Yerin (interior). Russia now had two presidents and two ministers of defense, security, and interior. Although Gennady Zyuganov and other top leaders of the Communist Party of the Russian Federation did not participate in the events, individual members of communist organizations actively supported the parliament.

On 23 September, with the observance of a quorum, the Congress of People's Deputies was convened (the quorum was 638). Congress purported to impeach Yeltsin. The same day, Yeltsin announced presidential elections for June 1994. On 24 September, the Congress of People's Deputies voted to hold simultaneous parliamentary and presidential elections by March 1994. Yeltsin scoffed at the parliament-backed proposal for simultaneous elections, and responded the next day by cutting off electricity, phone service, and hot water in the parliament building.

=== Mass protests and the barricading of the parliament ===
Yeltsin also sparked popular unrest with his dissolution of a Congress and parliament increasingly opposed to his neoliberal economic reforms. Tens of thousands of Russians marched in the streets of Moscow seeking to bolster the parliamentary cause. The demonstrators were protesting against the deteriorating living conditions. Since 1989, the GDP had been declining, corruption was rampant, violent crime was skyrocketing, medical services were collapsing and life expectancy falling. Yeltsin was also increasingly getting the blame. It is still hotly debated among Western economists, social scientists, and policy-makers as to whether or not the IMF, World Bank, and U.S. Treasury Department-backed reform policies adopted in Russia, often called "shock therapy", were responsible for Russia's poor record of economic performance in the 1990s or rather that Yeltsin had not gone far enough. (Note: Under the Western-backed economic program adopted by Yeltsin, the Russian government took several radical measures at once that were supposed to stabilize the economy by bringing state spending and revenues into balance and by letting market demand determine the prices and supply of goods. Under the reforms, the government let most prices float, raised taxes, and cut back sharply on spending in industry and construction. These policies caused widespread hardship as many state enterprises found themselves without orders or financing. The rationale of the program was to squeeze the built-in inflationary pressure out of the economy so that producers would begin making sensible decisions about production, pricing and investment instead of chronically overusing resources, as in the Soviet era. By letting the market rather than central planners determine prices, product mixes, output levels, and the like, the reformers intended to create an incentive structure in the economy where efficiency and risk would be rewarded and waste and carelessness were punished. Removing the causes of chronic inflation, the reform's architects argued, was a precondition for all other reforms: Hyperinflation would wreck both democracy and economic progress, they argued; only by stabilizing the state budget could the government proceed to restructure the economy. A similar reform program had been adopted in Poland in January 1990, with generally favorable results. However, Western critics of Yeltsin's reform, most notably Joseph Stiglitz and Marshall Goldman (who would have favored a more "gradual" transition to market capitalism) consider policies adopted in Poland ill-suited for Russia, given that the impact of communism on the Polish economy and political culture was far less indelible. See 'Has Russia Been on the Right Path?' by Kenneth Rogoff, IMF, August 26, 2002. Criticism on Stiglitz's perspective can be found in 'Whence Reform? A Critique of the Stiglitz Perspective' by M. Dabrowski, S. Gomulka, J. Rostowski, Centre for Economic Performance, September 2000.)

Under the Western-backed economic program adopted by Yeltsin, the Russian government took several radical measures at once that were supposed to stabilize the economy by bringing state spending and revenues into balance and by letting market demand determine the prices and supply of goods. Under the reforms, the government let most prices float, raised taxes, and cut back sharply on spending in industry and construction. These policies caused widespread hardship as many state enterprises found themselves without orders or financing. The rationale of the program was to squeeze the built-in inflationary pressure out of the economy so that the newly privatized producers would begin making sensible decisions about production, pricing and investment instead of chronically overusing resources, as in the Soviet era. By letting the market rather than central planners determine prices, product mixes, output levels, and the like, the reformers intended to create an incentive structure in the economy where efficiency and risk would be rewarded and waste and carelessness were punished. Removing the causes of chronic inflation, the reform's architects argued, was a precondition for all other reforms. Hyperinflation would wreck both democracy and economic progress, they argued; only by stabilizing the state budget could the government proceed to restructure the economy. A similar reform program had been adopted in Poland in January 1990, with generally favorable results. However, Western critics of Yeltsin's reform, most notably Joseph Stiglitz and Marshall Goldman (who would have favored a more "gradual" transition to market capitalism) consider policies adopted in Poland ill-suited for Russia, given that the impact of communism on the Polish economy and political culture was far less indelible.

Outside Moscow, the Russian masses overall were confused and disorganized. Nonetheless, some of them also tried to voice their protest, and sporadic strikes took place across Russia. The protesters included supporters of various communist (Labour Russia) and nationalist organizations, including those belonging to the National Salvation Front. A number of armed militants of Russian National Unity took part in the defense of the Russian White House, as reportedly did veterans of Tiraspol and Riga OMON. The presence of Transnistrian forces, including the KGB detachment 'Dnestr', stirred General Alexander Lebed to protest against Transnistrian interference in Russia's internal affairs. The coalition of monarchist, nationalist, fascist, communist and national bolshevik groups and protestors has been described as a red-brown alliance. Soviet as well as Romanow flags were prevalent among the crowds of protesters and were hoisted on barricades.

On 28 September, Moscow saw the first bloody clashes between the special police and anti-Yeltsin demonstrators. Also on the same day, the Russian Interior Ministry moved to seal off the parliament building. Barricades and wire were put around the building. On 1 October, the Interior Ministry estimated that 600 fighting men with a large cache of arms had joined Yeltsin's political opponents in the parliament building.

=== Storming of Ostankino Television Tower ===
The Congress of People's Deputies still did not discount the prospect of a compromise with Yeltsin. The Russian Orthodox Church acted as a host to desultory discussions between representatives of the Congress and the president. The negotiations with the Russian Orthodox Patriarch Alexy II as mediator continued until 2 October. On the afternoon of 3 October, the Moscow Municipal Militsiya failed to control a demonstration near the White House, and the political impasse developed into armed conflict.

On 2 October, supporters of parliament constructed barricades and blocked traffic on Moscow's main streets. Rutskoy signed a decree that had no practical consequences on the release of Viktor Chernomyrdin from the post of prime minister.

On the afternoon of 3 October, armed opponents of Yeltsin successfully stormed the police cordon around the White House territory, where the Russian parliament was barricaded. Paramilitaries from factions supporting the parliament, as well as a few units of the internal military (armed forces normally reporting to the Ministry of Interior), supported the Supreme Soviet.

Rutskoy greeted the crowds from the White House balcony, and urged them to form battalions and to go on to seize the mayor's office and the national television center at Ostankino. Khasbulatov also called for the storming of the Kremlin and imprisoning "the criminal and usurper Yeltsin" in Matrosskaya Tishina. At 16:00 Yeltsin signed a decree declaring a state of emergency in Moscow.

On the evening of 3 October, after taking the mayor's office located in the former Comecon HQ nearby, pro-parliament demonstrators and gunmen led by General Albert Makashov moved toward Ostankino, the television center. But the pro-parliament crowds were met by Militsiya and OMON forces who took positions in and around the TV complex. A pitched battle followed. Part of the TV center was significantly damaged. Television stations went off the air and 46 people were killed, according to official Russian state estimates, including Terry Michael Duncan, an American lawyer, who was in Moscow to establish a law firm and was killed while attempting to help the wounded. The government originally refused to report the number killed, which led to reports that as many as 1,500 people were killed. Before midnight, the Interior Ministry's units had turned back the parliament loyalists.

When broadcasting resumed late in the evening, vice-premier Yegor Gaidar called on television for a meeting in support of democracy and President Yeltsin "so that the country would not be turned yet again into a huge concentration camp". A number of people with different political convictions and interpretations over the causes of the crisis (such as Grigory Yavlinsky, Alexander Yakovlev, Yury Luzhkov, Ales Adamovich, and Bulat Okudzhava) also appealed to support the President. Similarly, the Civic Union bloc of 'constructive opposition' issued a statement accusing the Supreme Soviet of having crossed the border separating political struggle from criminality. Several hundred of Yeltsin's supporters spent the night in the square in front of the Moscow City Hall preparing for further clashes, only to learn in the morning of 4 October that the army was on their side.

The Ostankino killings went unreported by Russian state television. The only independent Moscow radio station's studios were burnt. Two French, one British, and one American journalist were killed by sniper fire during the massacre. A fifth journalist died from a heart attack. The press and broadcast news were censored starting on 4 October, and by the middle of October, prior censorship was replaced by punitive measures.

=== Storming of the White House ===
Between 2 and 4 October, the position of the army was the most important factor. The military equivocated for several hours about how to respond to Yeltsin's call for action. By this time dozens of people had been killed and hundreds had been wounded. Rutskoy, as a former general, appealed to some of his ex-colleagues. After all, many officers and especially rank-and-file soldiers had little sympathy for Yeltsin. The supporters of the parliament did not send any emissaries to the barracks to recruit lower-ranking officer corps, making the fatal mistake of attempting to deliberate only among high-ranking military officials who already had close ties to parliamentary leaders. In the end, a prevailing bulk of the generals did not want to take their chances with a Rutskoy–Khasbulatov regime. Some generals had stated their intention to back the parliament, but at the last moment moved over to Yeltsin's side.

The plan of action was proposed by Captain Gennady Zakharov. Ten tanks were to fire at the upper floors of the White House, with the aim of minimizing casualties but creating confusion and panic amongst the defenders. Five tanks were deployed at Novy Arbat bridge and the other five at Pavlik Morozov playground, behind the building. Then, special troops of the Vympel and Alpha units would storm the parliament premises. According to Yeltsin's bodyguard Alexander Korzhakov, firing on the upper floors was also necessary to scare off snipers. By sunrise on 4 October, the Russian army encircled the parliament building, and a few hours later army tanks began to shell the White House, punching holes in the front of it. At 8:00 am Moscow time, Yeltsin's declaration was announced by his press service. Yeltsin declared:

Those, who went against the peaceful city and unleashed bloody slaughter, are criminals. But this is not only a crime of individual bandits and pogrom-makers. Everything that took place and is still taking place in Moscow is a pre-planned armed rebellion. It has been organized by Communist revanchists, Fascist leaders, a part of former deputies, and the representatives of the Soviets.

Under the cover of negotiations they gathered forces, recruited bandit troops of mercenaries, who were accustomed to murders and violence. A petty gang of politicians attempted by armed force to impose their will on the entire country. The means by which they wanted to govern Russia have been shown to the entire world. These are cynical lies and bribery. These are cobblestones, sharpened iron rods, automatic weapons and machine guns.

Those, who are waving red flags, again stained Russia with blood. They hoped for the unexpectedness, for the fact that their impudence and unprecedented cruelty will sow fear and confusion.

Yeltsin assured the listeners: "The fascist-communist armed rebellion in Moscow shall be suppressed within the shortest period. The Russian state has necessary forces for this." By noon, troops entered the White House and began to occupy it, floor by floor. Rutskoy's desperate appeal to Air Force pilots to bomb the Kremlin was broadcast by the Echo of Moscow radio station but went unanswered. He also tried to have the Chairman of the Constitutional Court, Valery Zorkin, call the Western embassies to guarantee Rutskoy's and his associates' safety – to no avail. Hostilities were stopped several times to allow some in the White House to leave. By mid-afternoon, popular resistance in the streets was completely suppressed, barring occasional sniper fire.

The "second October Revolution", as it came to be known, saw the deadliest street fighting in Moscow since 1917. The official list of the dead, presented on July 27, 1994, by the investigation team of the Prosecutor General's Office of the Russian Federation, includes 147 people: 45 civilians and 1 serviceman in Ostankino, and 77 civilians and 24 military personnel of the Ministry of Defense and the Ministry of Internal Affairs in the "White House area". Human rights organisations like the Memorial Human Rights Centre have criticized the police forces, especially OMON, of using excessive force and torture against protestors and deputies. They also criticized the government's clampdown on the free press.

Some claim Yeltsin was backed by the military only grudgingly, and only "at the eleventh hour". The instruments of coercion gained the most, and they would expect Yeltsin to reward them in the future. A paradigmatic example of this was General Pavel Grachev, who had demonstrated his loyalty during this crisis. Grachev became a key political figure, despite many years of charges that he was linked to corruption within the Russian military.

=== International reactions and involvement ===
The Clinton administration and other Western powers strongly backed Yeltsin during the entirety of the crisis. Yeltsin already informed German chancellor Helmut Kohl one week prior to the announcement of the "special regime" on 20 March about his plans, who promised him full support from all Western powers. After Kohl informed Clinton about it, Clinton also gave Yeltsin a green light. The Clinton government, especially figures like Secretary of State Warren Christopher and his Special Adviser Strobe Talbott, feared that a Rutskoy government would stop Yeltsin's reforms and return to a form of nationalist communism. Rutskoy and Khasbulatov were, partly due to their positions (like demanding a military intervention in Transnistria and Abkhazia) as well as the nature of their supporters, partly due to the statements and influence from Yeltsin and his foreign secretary Andrei Kozyrev, described as neo-communist revanchists, reactionaries, proponents of a red-brown alliance and compared to Slobodan Milosevic.

Prior to the escalation of the conflict by the dissolution of the legislature, Kozyrev informed US Ambassador to Russia Thomas R. Pickering about Yeltsin's intentions. Following Yeltsin's announcement of dissolvement on 22 September 1993, President Clinton assured Yeltsin unwavering US support on a private phone call and publicly proclaimed "full support" for the Russian president.Secretary of State Warren Christopher urged Congress to approve another $2.5 Billion in economic aid to Russia. Christopher and the Clinton administration refused to comment on the legality of Yeltsin's actions, while some senior officials acknowledged the breach of the constitution, but still supported it. Rutskoy criticized Clintons support of Yeltsin's "anti-constitutional actions" in an interview on ABC News Nightline. In a private call with Special Adviser Strobe Talbott, Pickering called the support for Yeltsin a "no-brainer" and based his support on Yeltsin's promises for free elections while also acknowledging that those actions were unconstitutional. Pickering added that the US regarded the Russian constitution as a leftover from the Soviet era and did not necessarily consider it a "democratic, legitimate document". It is possible that Pickering envoked his own personal interpretation of constitutionalism in judging the legitimacy of the constitution. This skepticism validated and emboldened Yeltsin in his position during the confrontation.

After the violent end to the crisis, Clinton called Yeltsin and praised his handling of the crisis, not mentioning any of the deaths. In a meeting on 22 October between Warren Christopher and Yeltsin, Christopher congratulated Yeltsin on the "superb handling" of the crisis and praised Yeltsin's "restraint" that "caused the least loss of life". Christopher also proposed the establishment of the NATO Partnership for Peace program, assuring Yeltsin that it was an alternative to an eastward expansion of NATO. Christopher mentioned none of the criticisms and concerns that US diplomat to Russia James Collins had expressed in a private cable on 19 October. In this cable, Collins criticized Yeltsin's constitutional proposal as "half-baked" and expressed concerns that it would give the executive a "preponderance of authority", citing parts of Yeltsin's reform camp that worried about the establishment of a democracy that was "so heavily tilted toward[s] presidential power". Collins also issued worries about police brutality and the crackdown on the opposition following the confrontation.

German chancellor Kohl, a close friend of Yeltsin, also publicly backed Yeltsin during the confrontation, so did many other western leaders and leaders of the former Soviet states as well as the European Community, which negotiated Rutskoy's and Khasbulatov's surrender for a guarantee of safe passage. Of all major powers only the People's Republic of China remained neutral and didn't back Yeltsin. The unrecognized state of Transnistria was the only entity to back the parliament and sent volunteer fighters.

=== Public opinion on crisis ===
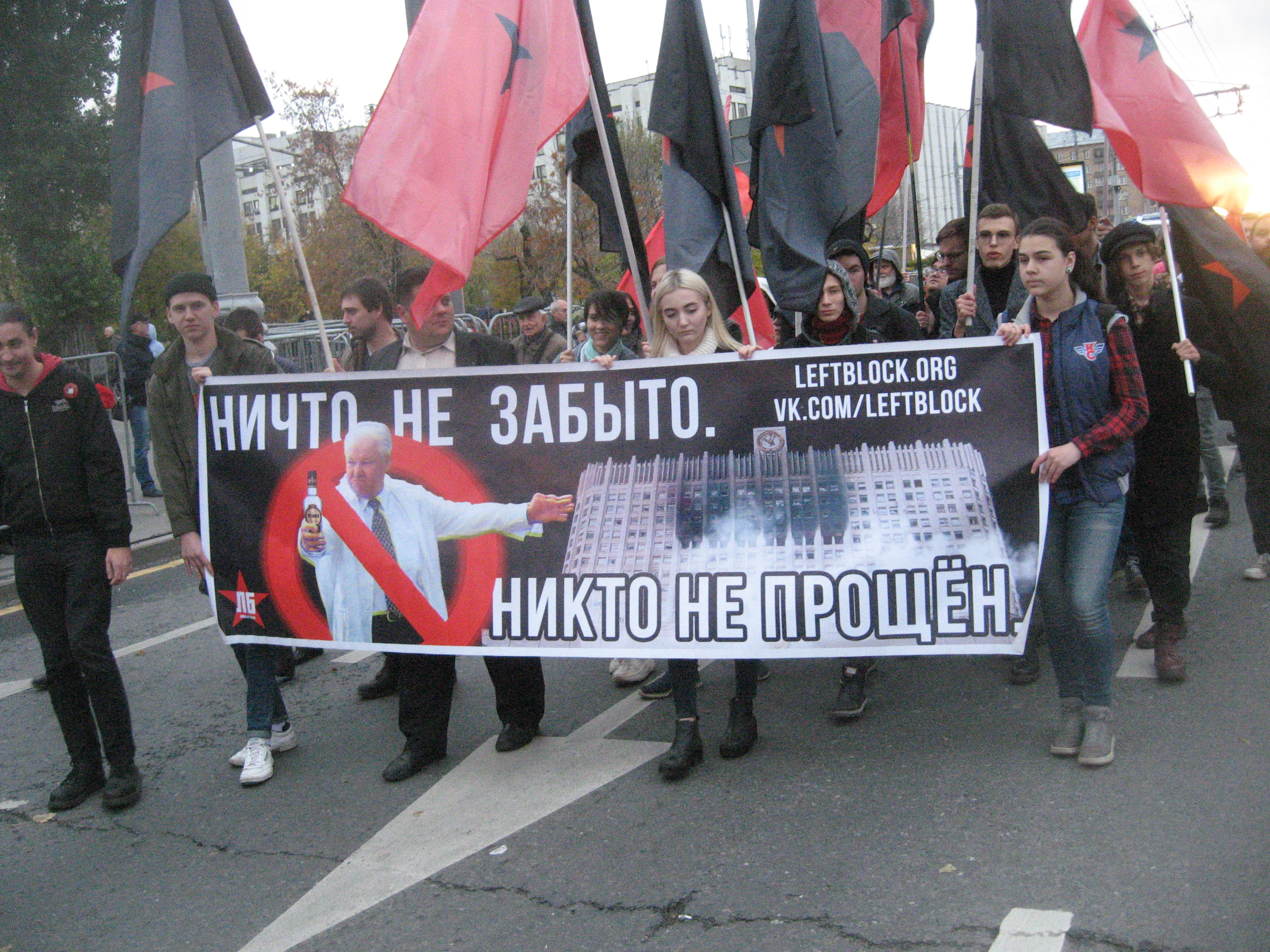
Memory action in 2019. The plaque, showing Yeltsin with a bottle of vodka, says "Nothing is forgotten, no one is forgiven".

The Russian public opinion research institute VCIOM, a state-controlled agency, conducted a poll in the aftermath of October 1993 events and found out that 70% of the people polled thought that the use of military force by Yeltsin was justified and 30% thought it was not justified. This support for Yeltsin's actions declined in later years. When VCIOM-A asked the same question in 2010, only 41% agreed with the use of the military, with 59% opposed. When asked about the main cause of the events of 3–4 October, 46% in the 1993 VCIOM poll blamed Rutskoy and Khasbulatov. Nine years following the crisis, the most popular culprit was the legacy of Mikhail Gorbachev with 36%, closely followed by Yeltsin's policies with 32%.

In the aftermath of the collapse of the Soviet Union, miner unions tended to support Yeltsin due to an informal alliance that had emerged between the two, where Yeltsin promised to meet their economic demands. This resulted in miner trade unions supporting Yeltsin in the constitutional crisis, however by the time of labour strikes in 1998, the Independent Miners Union admitted it had made a mistake in supporting Yeltsin and that it did not properly understand what was at stake in 1993 and now called for the resignation of Yeltsin.

== Yeltsin's consolidation of power ==
=== Immediate aftermath ===
On 5 October 1993, the newspaper Izvestia published the open letter "Writers demand decisive actions of the government" to the government and President signed by 42 well-known Russian literati and hence called the Letter of Forty-Two. It was written in reaction to the events and contained the following seven demands:

# All kinds of communist and nationalist parties, fronts, and associations should be disbanded and banned by a decree of the President.

1. All illegal paramilitary and a fortiori armed groups and associations should be identified and disbanded (with bringing them to criminal responsibility when it is bound by a law).
2. Legislation providing for heavy sanctions for propaganda of fascism, chauvinism, racial hatred, for calls for violence and brutality should finally begin to work. Prosecutors, investigators, and judges patronizing such socially dangerous crimes should be immediately removed from their work.
3. The organs of the press, which from day to day inspire hatred, call for violence and are, in our opinion, one of the main organizers and perpetrators of the tragedy (and potential perpetrators of a multitude of future tragedies), such as Den, Pravda, Sovetskaya Rossiya, Literaturnaya Rossiya (as well as the television program 600 Seconds) and a number of others, should be closed until the judicial proceedings start.
4. The activities of bodies of the Soviet authority which refused to obey the legitimate authority of Russia should be suspended.
5. We all together must prevent the trial of the organizers and participants of the bloody drama in Moscow from becoming similar to that shameful farce which is called "the trial of the Gang of Eight".
6. Recognize not only the Congress of People's Deputies, the Supreme Council but also all bodies (including the Constitutional Court) formed by them as nonlegitimate.

In the weeks following the storming of the White House, Yeltsin issued a barrage of presidential decrees intended to consolidate his position. On 5 October, Yeltsin banned political leftist and nationalist organizations and newspapers like Den', Sovetskaya Rossiya and Pravda that had supported the parliament (they would later resume publishing). In an address to the nation on 6 October, Yeltsin also called on those regional Soviets that had opposed him – by far the majority – to disband. Valery Zorkin, chairman of the Constitutional Court, was forced to resign. The chairman of the Federation of Independent Trade Unions was also sacked. The anti-Yeltsin TV broadcast 600 Seconds of Alexander Nevzorov was ultimately closed down.

Yeltsin decreed on 12 October that both houses of parliament would be elected in December. On 15 October, he ordered that a popular referendum be held in December on a new constitution. Rutskoy and Khasbulatov were charged on 15 October with "organizing mass disorders" and imprisoned. On 23 February 1994, the State Duma amnestied all individuals involved in the events of September–October 1993. They were later released in 1994 when Yeltsin's position was sufficiently secure. In early 1995, the criminal proceedings were discontinued and were eventually placed into the archives.

"Russia needs order," Yeltsin told the Russian people in a television broadcast in November in introducing his new draft of the constitution, which was to be put to a referendum on 12 December. The new basic law would concentrate sweeping powers in the hands of the president. The bicameral legislature, to sit for only two years, was restricted in crucial areas. The president could choose the prime minister even if the parliament objected and could appoint the military leadership without parliamentary approval. He would head and appoint the members of a new, more powerful security council. If a vote of no confidence in the government was passed, the president would be enabled to keep it in office for three months and could dissolve the parliament if it repeated the vote. The president could veto any bill passed by a simple majority in the lower house, after which a two-thirds majority would be required for the legislation to be passed. The president could not be impeached for contravening the constitution. The central bank would become independent, but the president would need the approval of the State Duma to appoint the bank's governor, who would thereafter be independent of the parliament. At the time, most political observers regarded the draft constitution as shaped by and for Yeltsin and perhaps unlikely to survive him.

=== End of the first constitutional period ===
On 12 December, Yeltsin managed to push through his new constitution, creating a strong presidency and giving the president sweeping powers to issue decrees; however, the parliament elected on the same day (with a turnout of about 53%) delivered a stunning rebuke to his neoliberal economic program. Candidates identified with Yeltsin's economic policies were overwhelmed by a huge protest vote, the bulk of which was divided between the Communists (who mostly drew their support from industrial workers, out-of-work bureaucrats, some professionals, and pensioners) and the ultra-nationalists (who drew their support from disaffected elements of the lower middle classes). Unexpectedly, the most surprising insurgent group proved to be the ultranationalist Liberal Democratic Party led by Vladimir Zhirinovsky. It gained 23% of the vote while the Gaidar-led Russia's Choice received 15.5% and the Communist Party of the Russian Federation, 12.4%. Zhirinovsky alarmed many observers abroad with his neo-fascist and chauvinist declarations. Nevertheless, the referendum marked the end of the constitutional period defined by the constitution adopted by the Russian SFSR in 1978, which was amended many times while Russia was a part of Mikhail Gorbachev's Soviet Union. Although Russia would emerge as a dual presidential–parliamentary system in theory, substantial power would rest in the president's hands. Russia now had a prime minister who heads a cabinet and directs the administration. Despite officially following a semi-presidential constitutional model, the system was effectively an example of president–parliamentary presidentialism because the prime minister is appointed and in effect freely dismissed by the president.

== See also ==
- History of Russia (1991–present)
- Politics of Russia
- List of attacks on legislatures
- Wagner Group rebellion
- 1992 Peruvian self-coup
- 1993 — Russian historical drama set in Moscow during the summer and fall of 1993, amidst the turbulent political events surrounding the 1993 Russian constitutional crisis.
