= Yale School of Management =

Graduate business school of Yale University

Coordinates: 41°18′55″N 72°55′13″W

- Coat of arms of the school
- Motto: Novus Ordo Seclorum (Latin)
- Motto in English: "A New Order of the Ages" "Educating Leaders for Business and Society"
- Type: Private business school
- Established: 1976
- Parent institution: Yale University
- Endowment: $1.27 billion
- Budget: $125.4 million
- Dean: Kerwin Kofi Charles
- Academic staff: 90 (including joint faculty)
- Postgraduates: 972, including: 666 MBA; 51 MAM; 134 EMBA; 32 MGBS; 11 MSR
- Doctoral students: 59 PhD
- Location: New Haven, Connecticut, United States
- Website: som.yale.edu

The Yale School of Management (also known as Yale SOM) is the graduate business school of Yale University, a private Ivy League research university in New Haven, Connecticut. The school awards the Master of Business Administration (MBA), MBA for Executives (EMBA), Master of Advanced Management (MAM), Master's Degree in Systemic Risk (SR), Master's Degree in Global Business & Society (GBS), Master's Degree in Asset Management (AM), and Ph.D. degrees, as well as joint degrees with nine other graduate programs at Yale University. The Yale School of Management is one of six Ivy League Business Schools.

The school conducts education and research in leadership, behavioral economics, operations management, marketing, entrepreneurship, organizational behavior, and other areas. The EMBA program offers focused study in healthcare, asset management, or sustainability.

The school also offers semester-long student exchange programs with HEC Paris, IESE, the London School of Economics, the National University of Singapore Business School, and Tsinghua University. Students may also propose a quarter- or semester-long exchange program with any of the 25 other schools of the Global Network for Advanced Management.

== History ==
Beginning in the 1950s, Yale University started to expand coursework offerings in business and organization management. A precursor to the School of Management, the Department of Industrial Administration, grew out of the Labor and Management Center, and conferred the master in industrial administration from 1958 through 1973. Professors Thomas Holmes, Chris Argyris, and David Votaw were instrumental in founding the MIA. In 1971, Yale University received a donation establishing a program in management from Frederick W. Beinecke, PhB 1909. Arriving in 1976, the first class of the two-year program that awarded a master's degree in public and private management (MPPM) attended the campus on Hillhouse Avenue.

Historically known for its strength in studies regarding nonprofits and the public sector, the school's focus began to evolve and changed its name to the Yale School of Management in 1994. Shortly thereafter in 1999, the School began offering a master of business (MBA) degree and discontinued the MPPM degree.

Yale SOM launched an executive MBA program for healthcare professionals in 2005, and in 2006, it introduced its mandatory, team-taught "Integrated Curriculum" for all MBA students.

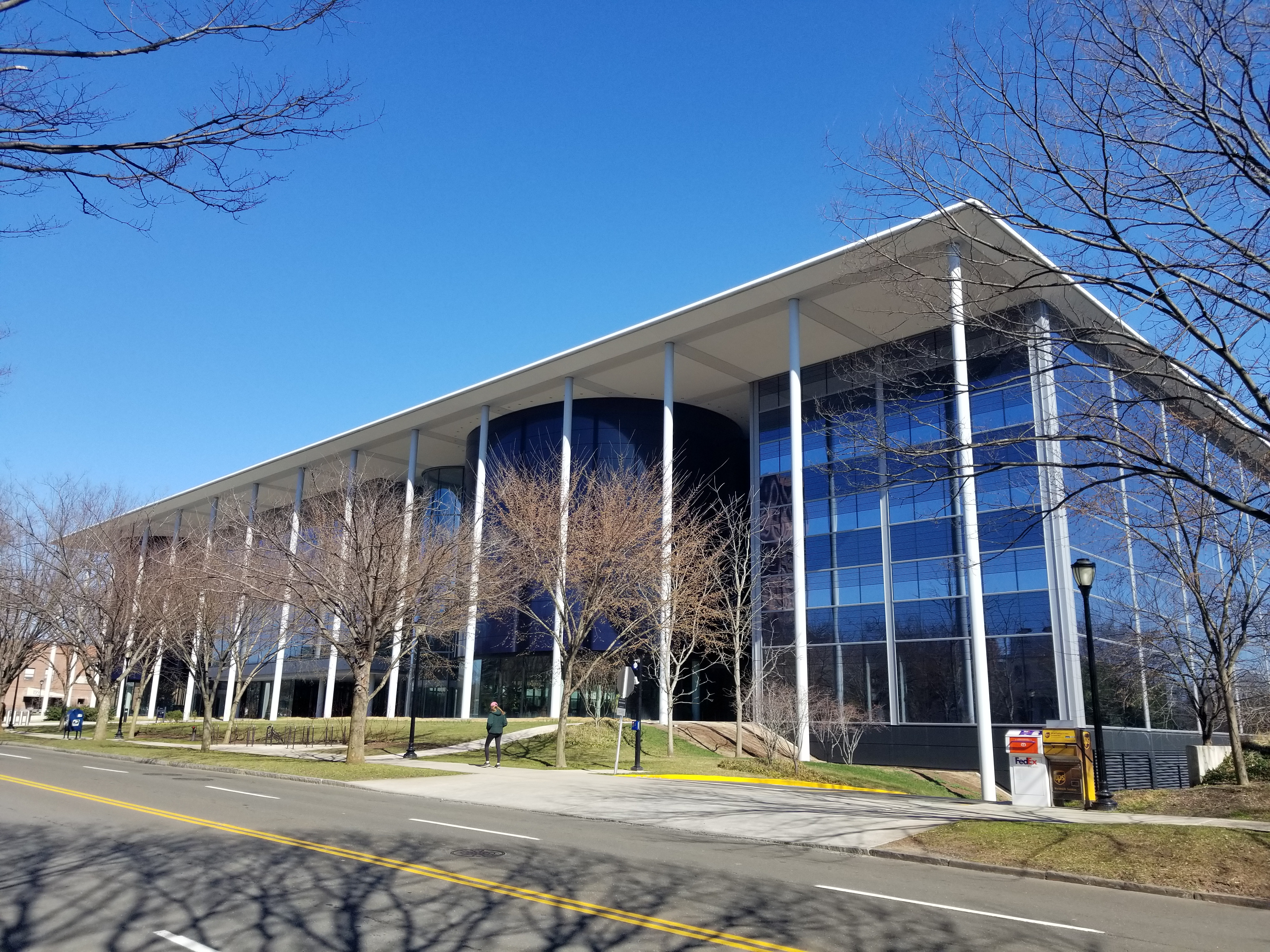
Edward P. Evans Hall, campus of Yale School of Management

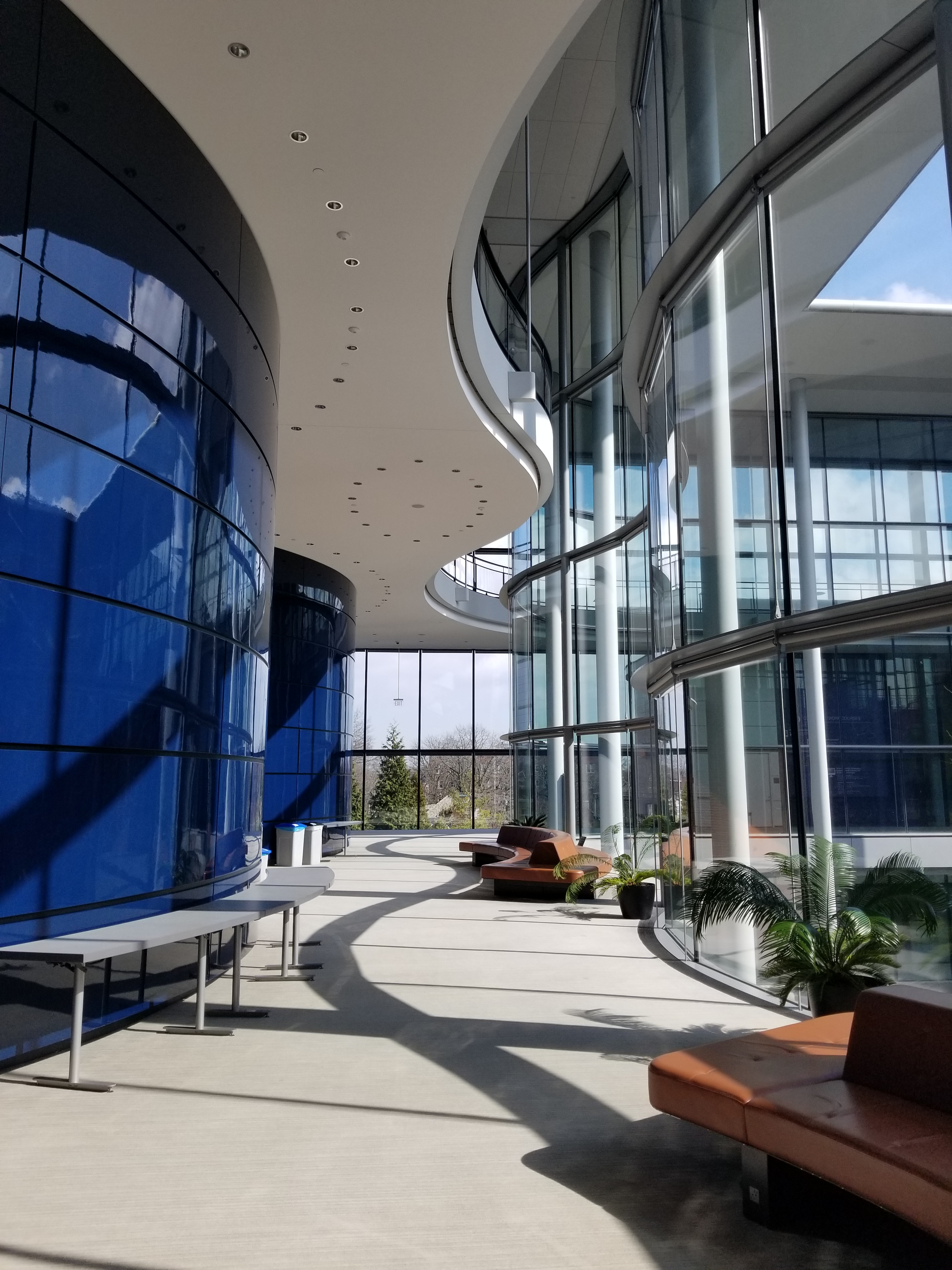
Evans Hall Corridor

In 2014, Yale SOM enrolled its first class of students in an expanded MBA for Executives program, offering the Yale MBA integrated core along with advanced study in asset management, healthcare, or sustainability. That same year in January, SOM's new building, Edward P. Evans Hall, opened at 165 Whitney Avenue, one block away from the old campus on Hillhouse Avenue.

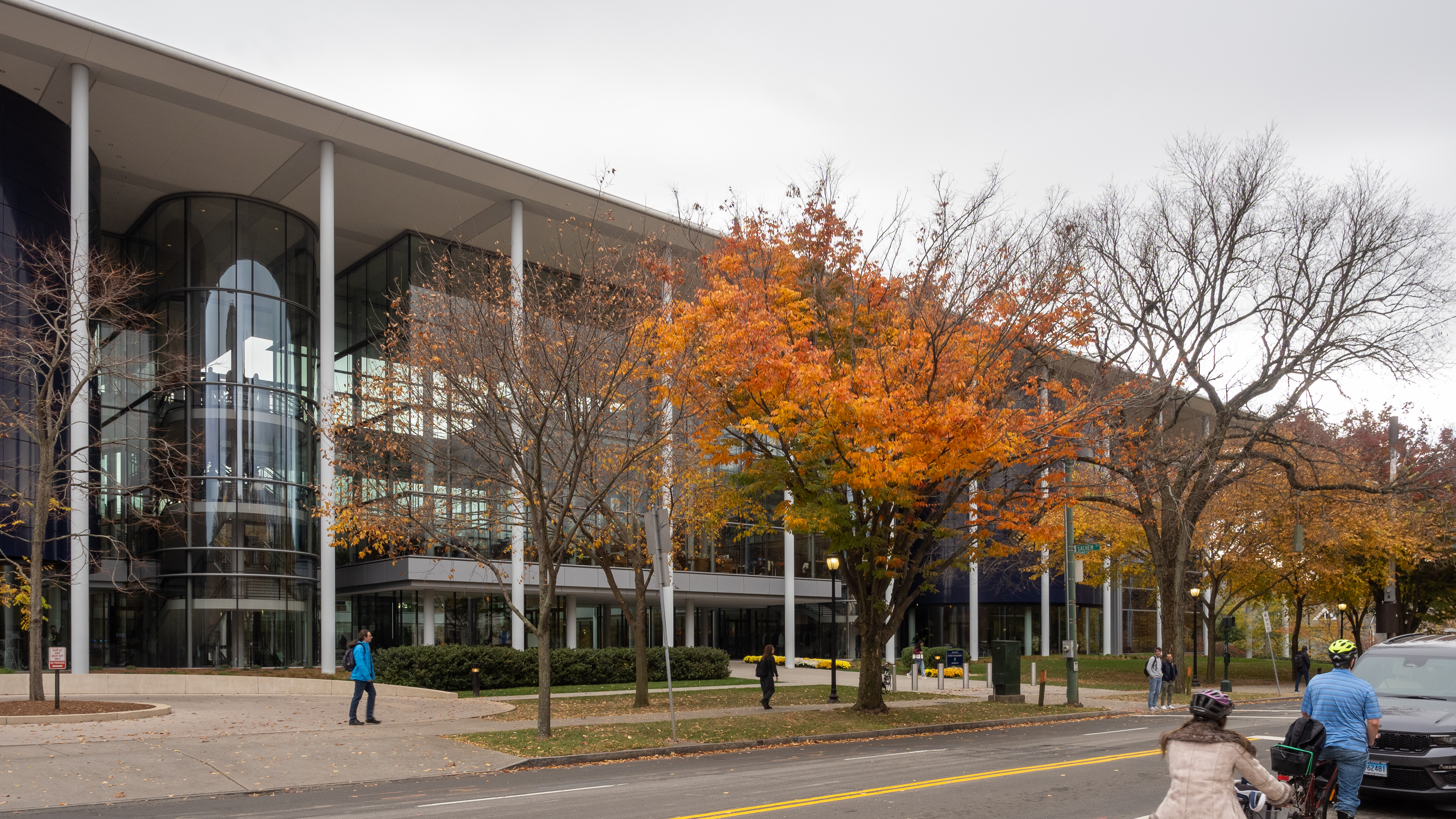
Front of Evans Hall

Foster and Partners, the firm chaired by Pritzker Architecture Prize Laureate Lord Norman Foster ARCH ’62, designed the building with Gruzen Samton stated as the Architect of Record. Edward P. Evans Hall houses technology-enabled classrooms, faculty offices, academic centers, and student and meeting spaces organized around an enclosed courtyard.

== Academics ==
=== Integrated Curriculum ===
For the 2006–07 academic year, the school introduced its "Integrated Curriculum", an effort to move away from the typical "siloed" teaching approach to a more cross-disciplinary curriculum. A multi-year, in-depth case study of the curricular reforms undertaken by Yale SOM demonstrated that while most business school curricular reforms happen at the fringe of the curriculum, mostly as fad, Yale SOM reforms were effective, extensive and substantial (Ashish Jaiswal, 2015). The new curriculum is composed of two components: foundational skills classes in a program called "Orientation to Management" that take place during the first semester of the MBA program and a set of classes called "Organizational Perspectives" that take place during the second through fourth quarters of the first academic year and are case- and lecture-focused courses that decompose business components into the perspectives of different stakeholders.

==== Orientation to Management ====
The Orientation to Management is the first segment of the curriculum, which introduces students to core concepts and business skills. The constituent courses include Managing Groups and Teams, Global Virtual Teams, Basics of Accounting, Probability Modeling and Statistics, Basics of Economics, Modeling Managerial Decisions, and Introduction to Negotiation.

==== Organizational Perspectives ====
Organizational Perspectives is a series of interdisciplinary, team-taught master classes that make up the majority of required MBA courses at SOM. These courses include Employee, Innovator, Operations Engine, Sourcing and Managing Funds, Competitor, Customer, Investor, The Global Macro-economy, and State and Society. The final Organizational Perspectives course, the Executive, focuses on solving a series of case studies involving cross-national or global business challenges and draw on the subject matter taught in the other Organizational Perspectives courses and Orientation to Management skills.

The Organizational Perspectives courses are both in lecture and case format which include cases from multi-media "raw" cases developed by SOM and the Global Network for Advanced Management.

==== Electives ====
MBA candidates are able to take electives courses at the School of Management commencing during the second semester of the MBA candidates' first year of instruction and during their entire second year of study. These electives include pedagogy drawing from traditional lecture and case-based instruction as well as includes independent reading and research with professors and instructors.

SOM students are also permitted to enroll in the classes offered by other graduate and professional schools and at Yale University including the Yale Graduate School of Arts and Sciences, Yale Law School, Yale School of Public Health, and undergrad classes at Yale College.

=== Global Studies Requirement ===
MBA candidates are required to complete a Global Studies Requirement prior to graduation. This requirement can be fulfilled a number of ways including an International Experience Course, a Global Network Week, a Global Network Course, The Global Social Entrepreneurship Course, the Global Social Enterprise Course, or a term-long international exchange with a partner school.

=== Admission ===
Admission requirements for the MBA include an earned four-year bachelor's degree from an accredited U.S. institution or the international equivalent, completion of an online application form and essay, GMAT or GRE score, academic transcripts, two professional recommendations, completion of video questions, a behavioral assessment, and a fee. The behavioral assessment is a forced-choice, multiple-choice online module lasting 20–25 minutes that measures inter- and intra-personal competencies associated with business school success.

During the admissions cycle of 2020-2021, for the class of 2023, the MBA class was composed of 20% under-represented students of color, 49% of the US students are students of color, 9% are first-generation college graduates. Matriculating students represented 38 different countries and 176 different academic institutions with 15% having previously earned a graduate degree. Yale SOM is the fourth most selective MBA program with approximately 10.9 applicants competing for each seat.

Class	MBA Class of '23	MBA Class of '22	MBA Class of '21	MBA Class of '20	MBA Class of '19	MBA Class of '18	MBA Class of '17	MBA Class of '16	MBA Class of '15
Students	349	350	345	347	348	334	326	323	291
Women	43%	39%	42%	43%	43%	43%	40%	37%	39%
International Students*	44%	40%	44%	45%	45%	46%	40%	39%	32%
Average Work Experience (In years)			5.1						
Average GMAT	726	720	721	724	727	725	721	720	720
Middle 80% GMAT range	640-780	680-760	690-760	690–760	690–760	690–760	680–760	690–740	
Average GRE Verbal Score	165	165	165						
Average GRE Quant Score	165	164	163						
Median undergrad GPA	3.66	3.65	3.64	3.71	3.69	3.63	3.6	3.56	3.6
80% undergrad GPA		2.91-4.0	3.34–3.92	3.36–3.92	3.38–3.94	3.31–3.91	3.23–3.88	3.17–3.87	3.36–3.8

* International Students is a metric of "International Passport Holders"

Students represent 47 international countries in the class of 2021 from countries including Armenia, Ghana, Lebanon, Mauritius, and Peru.

Collectively, the class of 2021 speaks 44 languages, with over 69% of the class speaking more than two languages, and 28% of the class speaking more than three languages.

=== Employment statistics ===
The class of 2021, median overall compensation was ~$193,000 for the first year out of school. The distribution by employment location follows approximately one-half of the class staying within the Northeast (New York City & Boston), between one-quarter and one-third moving out west (San Francisco, Los Angeles, Seattle), and the remaining flowing to the Mid-Atlantic / Mountain West / South.

=== Rankings ===
Business school rankings

United States
- QS MBA: 9
- Financial Times MBA: 8
- Bloomberg MBA: 12
- USNWR MBA: 11
- THE Business: 7

Global
- QS MBA: 15
- Financial Times MBA: 17
- THE Business: 12

Yale is ranked by Poets and Quants in the top ten over the past eight years and has remained in tenth place since 2015.

From 2011 to 2017, applications rose 46%—more than any other peer school, and 2017 alone saw a 12.3% increase in applications. In 2017, total academic quality of its incoming class was second only to Stanford, and total median pay of its alumni exceeded Columbia's, MITs, and U Chicago, despite more students than other peer schools pursuing non-profit work. Yale ranked number one in U.S. News & World Report's 2017 "Best Non-Profit MBA Rankings".

Yale's faculty were rated #1 of all MBA faculty in the Economist survey in 2018.

The 2018 Princeton Review put SOM at #2 for "Best Green MBA", #6 for "Toughest MBA to get into", and #7 for "Best MBA for Consulting" and "Best MBA for Management".

== Degrees ==
The Yale School of Management (SOM) offers a number of postgraduate degrees, including the two-year Master's of Business Administration (MBA), MBA for Executives, Master of Advanced Management (MAM), Masters of Management Studies in Systemic Risk, and several doctorate degrees.

=== MBA ===
The MBA a traditional full-time, two-year program that allows students to take a wide array of core courses and electives at the university.

=== MBA for Executives ===
The MBA for Executives at SOM during the 2017–18 academic year includes 71 students, 35% of whom are women. Graduates of the MBA for Executives program go through the full MBA-integrated core curriculum. They also take advanced management courses as well as colloquia and advanced courses in one of three areas of focus: healthcare, asset management, or sustainability.

=== Master of Advanced Management ===
The Master of Advanced Management (MAM) is a one-year degree program for MBA graduates from international business schools.

Admission to the Master of Advanced Management program is available to MBA students from top international business schools, including those in the Global Network for Advanced Management, who either (1) have recently graduated with an MBA degree or (2) who are enrolled in an MBA program and expect to receive their MBA degree or equivalent before matriculating at Yale.

Yale SOM may admit exceptional students from the Global Network for Advanced Management member schools who have not yet completed their MBA or equivalent degree provided.

The MAM class of 2022 is composed of 55 students from 27 countries and 17 Global Network for Advanced Management schools and is 45% women.

=== Master of Management Studies in Systemic Risk ===
The Master of Management Studies in Systemic Risk is a recent degree added to the SOM curriculum, added in the 2017–18 academic school year. The program is a specialized master's degree for early- and mid-career students who are interested in the role of central banking and other major regulatory agencies. The Wall Street Journal has described the program as a "Degree of Danger" as it focuses on training the "next generation of regulators".

=== Master of Management Studies in Asset Management ===
The Master of Management Studies in Asset Management is a graduate degree program that targets students as well as working professionals. The degree has been developed in parallel with and also runs in collaboration with the Yale Investments Office. The program is highly rigorous and quant-heavy, with Asset Management students taking on advanced PhD level coursework. Strong computer programming, mathematics, and statistics skills coupled with financial modeling and business-related experiences are needed for success in this program. The first cohort of 56 students was welcomed in 2021 with an acceptance rate of approximately 2%, making it the most selective out of all Yale University programs.

=== Doctor of Philosophy ===
The doctoral program (PhD) at Yale SOM is a full-time, in-residence program intended for students who plan scholarly careers involving research and teaching in management. There are five major tracks for PhD students follow at SOM: Accounting, Finance, Marketing, Operations, and Organizations and Management. The program is structured so that it can be completed in three to five years. The curriculum for the first two years of PhD candidates is composed of 14 courses, which include two core courses, a social science sequence, an empirical methods sequence, a depth requirement, a breadth requirement, and electives. The program is small and admits only a few students each year; there are currently 51 doctoral candidates in the program. All admitted students are given a full stipend for five years if they satisfy the program's requirements.

=== Joint Degrees ===
The School's joint-degree programs include the MBA/JD with Yale Law School, MBA/MD with Yale School of Medicine, MBA/PhD with Yale Graduate School of Arts and Sciences, MBA/MEM or MF with Yale School of Forestry and Environmental Studies, MBA/MArch with Yale School of Architecture, MBA/MFA with Yale School of Drama, MBA/MDiv or MBA/MAR with Yale Divinity School, MBA/MPH with Yale School of Public Health, and MBA/MA in Global Affairs with the Jackson Institute for Global Affairs. Approximately 11% of MBA candidates of the class of 2021 are pursuing dual degrees. Further, in the 2018–2019 academic year, over 1,300 instances of non-SOM students from Yale College and other Graduate and Professional schools registered for SOM classes.

=== Global Pre-MBA Leadership ===
The school offers a Global Pre-MBA Leadership Program that introduces recent college undergraduates from cultural backgrounds that are under-represented in graduate management education to the benefits of an MBA degree.

=== Yale Global Executive Leadership Program ===
The Yale Global Executive Leadership Program is an eight-month, advanced executive education program designed for senior leaders seeking to elevate their global impact. It combines in-person modules at Yale School of Management with virtual sessions, focusing on strategic leadership, governance, behavioral economics, and personal leadership purpose. Participants benefit from executive coaching, peer learning, and access to Yale's global leadership network. The program culminates in the Yale CEO Summit, offering direct engagement with top global executives.

=== Silver Scholars ===
Initiated in 2001, the Silver Scholar program was originally open only to Yale undergraduates and was intended to attract more non-traditional MBA candidates with experience outside business and finance. It has since expanded to consider applications from college seniors around the world. Even so, the program remains small. In 2014, SOM admitted only 15 Silver Scholars.

Despite conventional wisdom that MBA programs require previous work experience, Silver Scholars' job placement and scholarship statistics are at least as good as Yale's traditional MBAs. With an approximately 5% admit rate, the program is more selective than the traditional MBA program at Yale, as well as most other early admission MBA programs, including those at Stanford Graduate School of Business and Harvard Business School.

The School offers the Silver Scholars Program to exceptional college seniors with a "combination of Intelligence, Maturity, and Curiosity, who aim to be leaders in their field". It's been called an "alternative" to deferred admissions policies for undergraduate applicants offered by other top MBA programs. It is distinct in that it is one of a very small number of schools to offer an MBA schedule specifically tailored to recent graduates, and the only one to offer a mid-program internship.

Silver Scholars matriculate immediately from undergrad into the School of Management and participate in a one-year, full-time internship after completing the first year of the Integrated Core Curriculum. Following their internship, Silver Scholars return to campus to complete their second year of MBA coursework. At SOM, that second year has minimal requirements, and students may take courses across all Yale's grad schools. In some circumstances, Silver Scholars receive permission to defer their matriculation as a result of fellowships or other extraordinary circumstances or extend their internships by an additional year. A total of 17 Silver Scholars matriculated in the fall of 2019.

== Community ==
=== Student life ===
Students at the School, like all Yale University students and alumni, are called "Yalies" or "SOMers". They operate more than 40 MBA student clubs. There are career-oriented clubs such as Finance, Private Equity, Investment Management, Technology, Marketing, and Consulting. There are clinic-type clubs, such as Global Social Enterprise and Outreach Nonprofit Consulting, through which students complete pro bono consulting engagements with local and international non-profits. There are also athletic clubs including soccer, frisbee, crew, rugby, skiing, and squash. SOM participates in the coed MBA ice hockey tournaments during winter months. The Yale SOM Cup soccer tournament is held in October and attracts clubs from numerous top business schools. Each November, many students attend the Harvard-Yale football game (known as "The Game"), the location of which alternates each year between New Haven and Cambridge. Yale MBA students, like other members of the Yale graduate student community, frequent Gryphon's Pub, the bar owned and operated by GPSCY (Graduate and Professional Students Center at Yale).

=== Alumni and student giving ===
The Yale School of Management raised more than $3.9 million from a record 54.8% alumni in fiscal year 2018, the third straight year of participation of more than 50% of living alumni with an average donation size of $900.

SOM is the business school with the second-highest alumni participation in annual charitable contributions, behind Dartmouth Tuck School of Business at 70+% contribution and ahead of the University of Virginia Darden School of Business at 42% participation according to 2015 statistics.

The graduating MAM, MBA, and Executive MBA classes of 2016 all had a 100% contribution rate towards their class gifts prior to commencement.

== Research ==
The School is home to the following research centers and programs:

- The Center for Business and Environment is a collaboration between the Yale School of Management and the Yale School of Forestry & Environmental Studies
- The Center for Customer Insights
- The International Center for Finance
- The Chief Executive Leadership Institute
- The China India Insights Program
- The Program on Entrepreneurship
- The Program on Social Enterprise
- The Initiative on Leadership and Organization
- The Yale Program on Financial Stability provides research and training regarding risk management in global financial markets. Regular panels are convened with participants including former Secretaries of the Treasury Timothy Geithner and Henry Paulson, and former Federal Reserve Chairman Ben Bernanke. Typical participants for master classes hosted by the Program on Financial Stability include members from over 20 central banks and several non-central bank organizations including the Federal Deposit Insurance Corporation.
- The Yale Center Beijing is located in the Chaoyang district of Beijing and supports research and study from each of the University's schools and divisions and serves as a gathering place for alumni from throughout Asia.

== Media ==
Yale Insights is published by Yale SOM, covering a wide range of topics at the intersection of business and society.

Several podcasts are recorded at SOM, the most famous of which being The Design of Business | the Business of Design, hosted by Yale professors Michael Bierut and Jessica Helfand in coordination with a class they teach at SOM.

== Finances ==
=== Loan Repayment ===
Graduates who meet income eligibility requirements and who work full-time for government or nonprofit organizations can receive full or partial loan reimbursement for their annual debt repayment on need-based loans. It is the first program of its kind (started in 1986), and "is the most generous loan repayment program among business schools", with over $1.4M in loan forgiveness provided in 2014, and $7.7M from 2010 to 2015.

=== Endowment ===
The School's endowment fund was valued at $861 million in 2019, which is the sixth largest endowment of any U.S. business school and third highest endowment per student. Yale University endowment fund manager David Swensen has generated exceptional investment returns over the past two decades.

== Faculty ==
=== List of Deans ===
	Dean	Years
1	William H. Donaldson	(1975–1980)
2	Geoffrey C. Hazard, Jr.	(1980–1981)
3	Burton G. Malkiel	(1981–1987)
4	Merton J. Peck	(1987–1988)
5	Michael E. Levine	(1988–1992)
6	Paul MacAvoy	(1992–1994)
7	Stanley Garstka	(1994–1995)
8	Jeffrey Garten	(1995–2005)
9	Joel M. Podolny	(2005–2008)
10	Sharon Oster	(2008–2011)
11	Ted Snyder	(2011–2019)
12	Kerwin Kofi Charles	(2019–Present)

=== Notable Current and Former Faculty ===
- William Drenttel – American Artist and Designer
- Jeffrey Garten – Former Undersecretary of Commerce for International Trade
- Gary Gorton – Expert in stock and futures markets, banking, and asset pricing; Editor, Review of Economic Studies
- Roger G. Ibbotson – Chairman, Chief Investment Officer, and co-founder of Zebra Capital Management, an equity hedge fund management firm; founder of Ibbotson Associates (a division of Morningstar, Inc.); financial markets expert and co-author of Global Investing
- Edward H. Kaplan – Operations research specialist; recipient of the Lanchester Prize and the Edelman Award
- Ira Millstein – Antitrust lawyer with Weil, Gotshal & Manges, proponent of shareholder activism
- Barry Nalebuff – Game theory specialist; co-founder of Honest Tea, Inc., a fast-growing beverage company
- Sharon Oster – Competitive strategy authority; author of Modern Competitive Analysis
- Robert Shiller – Behavioral finance expert; Nobel Prize winner; Chief Economist and co-founder of MacroMarkets, LLC, a financial markets firm; author of Irrational Exuberance, Market Volatility, The New Financial Order: Risk In The 21st Century, and Macro Markets; co-developer of the Case-Shiller index
- David Swensen – Former Chief Investment Officer of Yale University; developer of the Yale Model of investing; author of Pioneering Portfolio Management
- Stephen Roach – Former Chairman of Morgan Stanley Asia; Former Managing Director and Chief Economist of Morgan Stanley
- Jeffrey Sonnenfeld – President and founder, The Chief Executive Leadership Institute
- Victor Vroom – Pioneer of expectancy theory
- Stephen Schwarzmann – Chairman, CEO & Co-Founder of Blackstone
- Jon Iwata – Former SVP and Chief Brand Officer of IBM
- Daniel Gross – Director, Climate Pledge Fund at Amazon; Founder of Pivotal 180

== Donaldson Fellows Program for alumni ==
Starting in 2008, the School of Management began recognizing two-year Donaldson Fellows, "graduates whose personal and professional accomplishments embody the school's mission to educate leaders for business and society".

== Notable alumni ==
As of 2025, the Yale School of Management has over 12,000 alumni.

- Zhang Lei – Founder and Managing Partner, Hillhouse Capital Group
- Neil Shen – Managing Partner and Co-founder, HongShan (Formerly Sequoia China)
- Indra Nooyi – Former CEO, PepsiCo, Inc.
- Seth Goldman – Chairman, Beyond Meat; Former CEO and President, Honest Tea
- Jane Mendillo – Former CEO and President, Harvard Management Company
- Daniel Weiss – Former CEO, Metropolitan Museum of Art; Former President, Haverford College; Former President, Lafayette College
- John L. Thornton – Former President and Co-COO, Goldman Sachs; Professor, Tsinghua University
- Richard Kauffman – Former Chairman, NYSERDA; Former Partner, Goldman Sachs
- Ned Lamont – 89th Governor of Connecticut
- Justin Elicker — Mayor of New Haven, Connecticut
- Austin Ligon – Co-founder and Former CEO, CarMax
- Tim Collins – CEO and founder, Ripplewood Holdings LLC
- Adam Blumenthal – Managing General Partner, Blue Wolf Capital Management
- Anne Glover – CEO and Co-founder, Amadeus Capital Partners
- Ken Ofori-Atta – Former Minister for Finance and Economic Planning, Ghana
- Donald Gips – CEO, Skoll Foundation; Former United States Ambassador to South Africa
- Hilary Pennington – Executive Vice President, Ford Foundation; Former Director, Bill & Melinda Gates Foundation
- Mary Ellen Iskenderian – President and CEO, Women's World Banking
- Susan Kilsby – Former Chairman, Shire (Acquired by Takeda)
- Martha N. Johnson – Administrator, United States General Services Administration
- Roger H. Brown – Former President, Berklee College of Music
- Chad Troutwine – CEO and Co-founder, Veritas Prep
- Bradley Abelow – Former Treasurer, State of New Jersey; Former Partner, Goldman Sachs
- Laszlo Bock – Former CEO and Co-founder, Humu; former Vice President, Google
- Curtis Chin – Former Chairman, Milken Institute Asia Center
- Michael R. Eisenson – CEO, Managing Director, and Co-founder, Charlesbank Capital Partners
- Anne Glover – CEO and Co-founder, Amadeus Capital Partners
- John D. Howard – CEO, Irving Place Capital (formerly Bear Stearns Merchant Banking)
- Wendi Deng Murdoch – Former VP, News Corporation; Co-founder, Artsy; wife of Rupert Murdoch
- Ann Olivarius – Chair and Senior Partner, McAllister Olivarius
- Bruce Ovbiagele – Chief of Staff, San Francisco Healthcare System and Founder, Society for Equity Neuroscience
- Bobby Sager – Philanthropist on whom the title character of NBC TV show The Philanthropist is loosely based
- Ashwin Sanghi – Bestselling Author, known for Chanakya's Chant and The Rozabal Line

== See also ==
- Yale Insights, a Yale SOM publication
- Economics
- Glossary of economics
- List of United States business school rankings
- List of business schools in the United States
- Yale Club of New York City
- Yale Corporation
- Yale Publishing Course
