= K. Sudhir =

American economist

K. Sudhir is an American economist, currently the James L. Frank '32 Professor of Private Enterprise and Management, Professor of Marketing, and Director of the China India Insights Program at the Yale School of Management.
