= The Krishna Key =

2012 novel by Ashwin Sanghi

- First edition cover
- Author: Ashwin Sanghi
- Language: English
- Genre: Novel, Thriller
- Publisher: Westland Books
- Publication date: 2012
- Publication place: India
- Media type: Print Paperback
- Pages: 475 pp (first edition, paperback)
- ISBN: 978-93-81626-68-9
- Preceded by: Chanakya's Chant

The Krishna Key is a 2012 anthropological thriller by Indian author Ashwin Sanghi and is his third novel. The book follows a history professor who has to prove his innocence against a murder charge.

== Plot summary ==
The Krishna Key centers around Professor Ravi Mohan Saini, the protagonist and a historian who has been accused of the murder of his childhood friend Anil Varshney, a famous archaeologist who has managed to decipher the script of Indus Valley seals. In an attempt to clear his name, Saini looks into the past of Indian Mythology's grey and unexplored areas and uncovers the truth about a serial killer, Taarak Vakil who believes himself to be Kalki, the final avatar of Lord Vishnu. Saini travels from the ancient ruins of the Lost City of Dvārakā to a temple in Vrindavan which was almost destroyed by the Mughal Emperor Aurangzeb in an attempt to discover one of Krishna's lost treasures, the Syamantaka gem, also known in alchemy as the philosopher's stone, and stop the killer from murdering his friends who are also under the threat.

The plot involves four different pieces of a seal which must be brought together to solve the puzzle. Each part of the seal is in the possession of different people who are the descendants of the ancient Yadava tribe, namely Saini, Bhoja, Vrishni, Kukura and Chedi. The author narrates a detailed version of the post-Mahabharatha history through the protagonist, a distinguished professor of history, who himself happens to be a lineal descendant of Lord Krishna being from Saini tribe of Punjab. The author also portrays the biography of Lord Krishna in his own words, in parallel to the main story-line.

== Research ==
Sanghi stated that he "wanted to do a story in connection with the Mahabharata, but not retelling of the epic which has already been done" and undertook a month's research, saying that he "had to be extremely cautious in dealing with this topic as we put a premium on personal belief and faith". He chose Krishna as one of the book's themes because Krishna is a "perfectly grey character".

== See also ==
- Ashwin Sanghi
- The Rozabal Line
- Chanakya's Chant
