= Edward Snyder =

Edward Snyder may refer to:

- Ted Snyder (1881–1965), American composer and lyricist
- Edward Snyder (cinematographer) (1895–1982), American cinematographer
- Eddie Snyder (1919–2011), American composer and songwriter
- J. Edward Snyder (1924–2007), U.S. navy officer
- Ed Snider (1933–2016), American chairman of Comcast Spectacor
- Ted Snyder (economist) (born 1953), American economist
