= Kingsholm Stadium =

Rugby union stadium in Gloucester, England

- Castle Grim; Holm; Queensholm

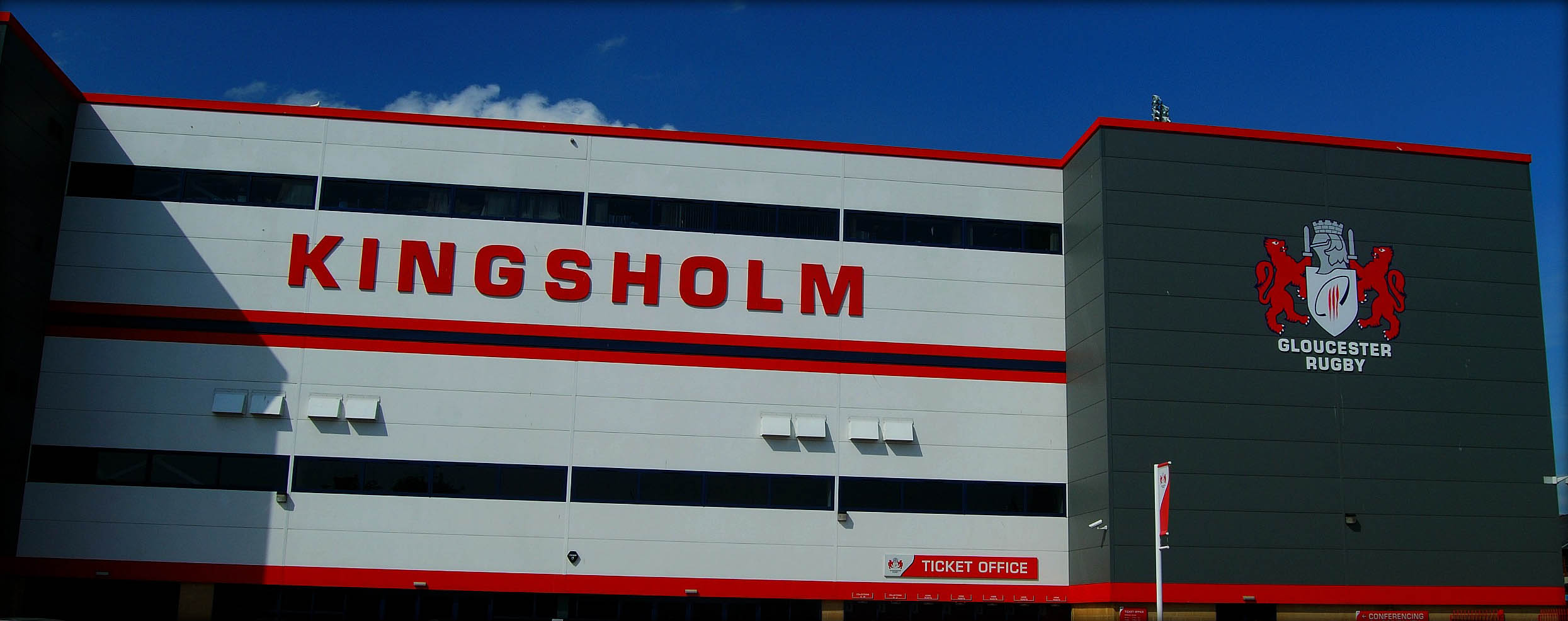
- Exterior view, November 2016
- Interactive map of Kingsholm Stadium
- Location: Gloucester, England
- Coordinates: 51°52′18″N 2°14′34″W
- Owner: Gloucester Rugby
- Capacity: 16,115 (12,000 Concerts)
- Surface: Artificial
- Public transit: Gloucester

Construction
- Built: 1891
- Opened: 1891; 135 years ago

Tenants
- Gloucester Rugby; Gloucester–Hartpury

Website
- kingsholmstadium.co.uk

Kingsholm Stadium is a rugby union stadium located in the Kingsholm area of Gloucester, England, and is the home stadium of Gloucester Rugby. The stadium has a capacity of 16,115. It is sometimes nicknamed 'Castle Grim', after the estate where the stadium is built. The new main grandstand, opened in 2007, is an all-seated 7,500 capacity stand along the south touchline. It is currently sponsored by Malvern Tyres.

Kingsholm was used as a home stadium for England before they settled at Twickenham and also hosted New Zealand versus United States for a pool match in the 1991 Rugby World Cup.

In common with many grounds of English professional rugby union clubs, Kingsholm features several terraced standing areas. One such area is the North Stand, which runs the whole length of the pitch, holds around 3,000 people and is known for sponsorship reasons as 'The Compeed Shed'. The Shed is known within rugby union for its low roof and proximity to the pitch which enhances the atmosphere created by the home supporters. The West Stand terrace holds around 1,615 spectators and has a row of hospitality boxes located above. It is sponsored by Allstone Speedy Skips.

The East Stand is an all-seater stand located directly on Kingsholm Road. It holds around 3,000 fans. It is sponsored by Stowford Press.

== History ==
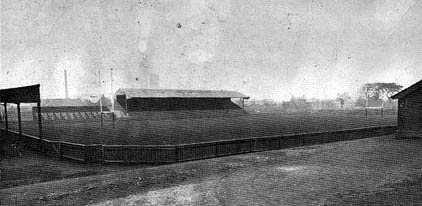
Exterior view in 1924

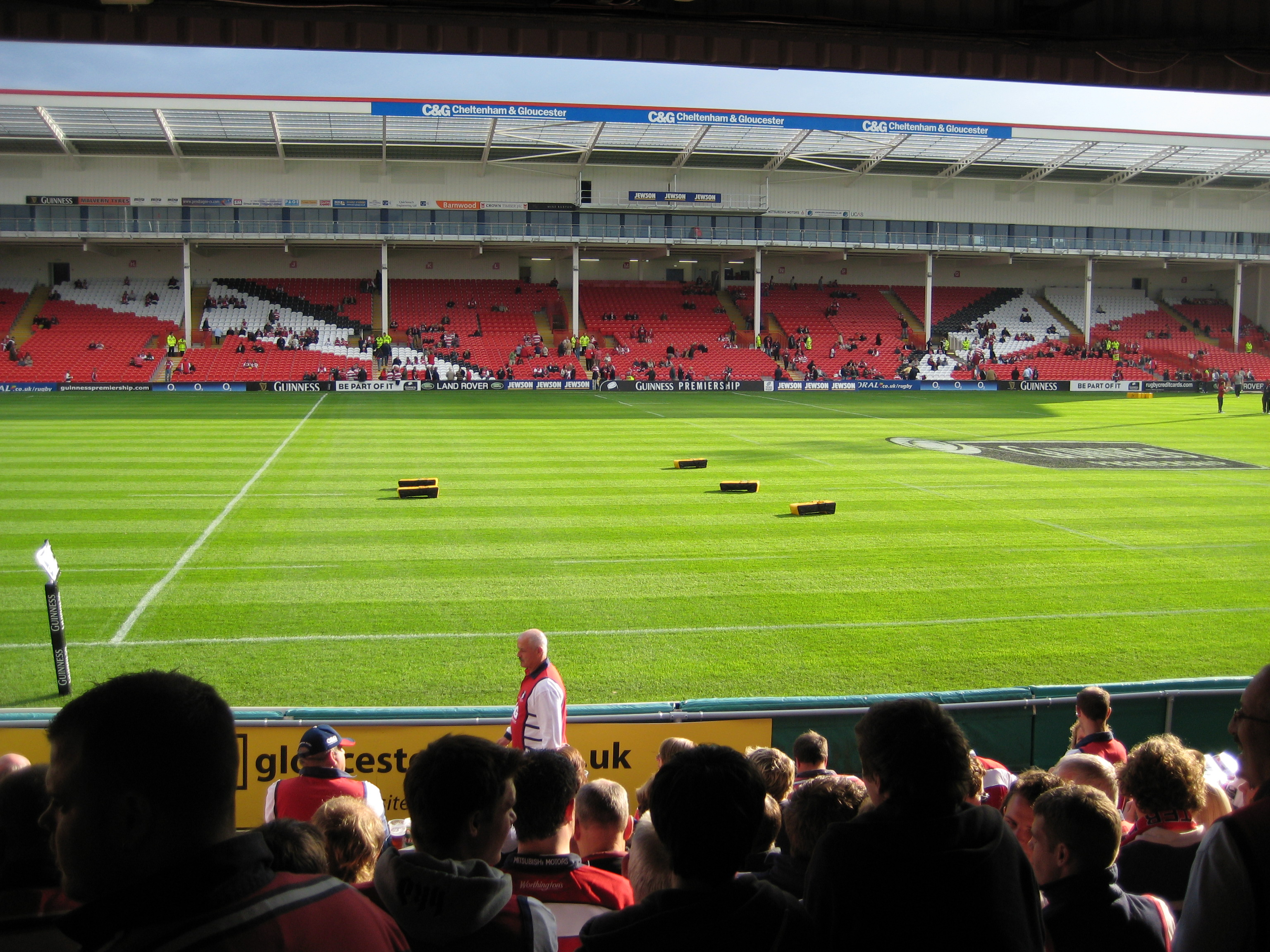
The view from the shed

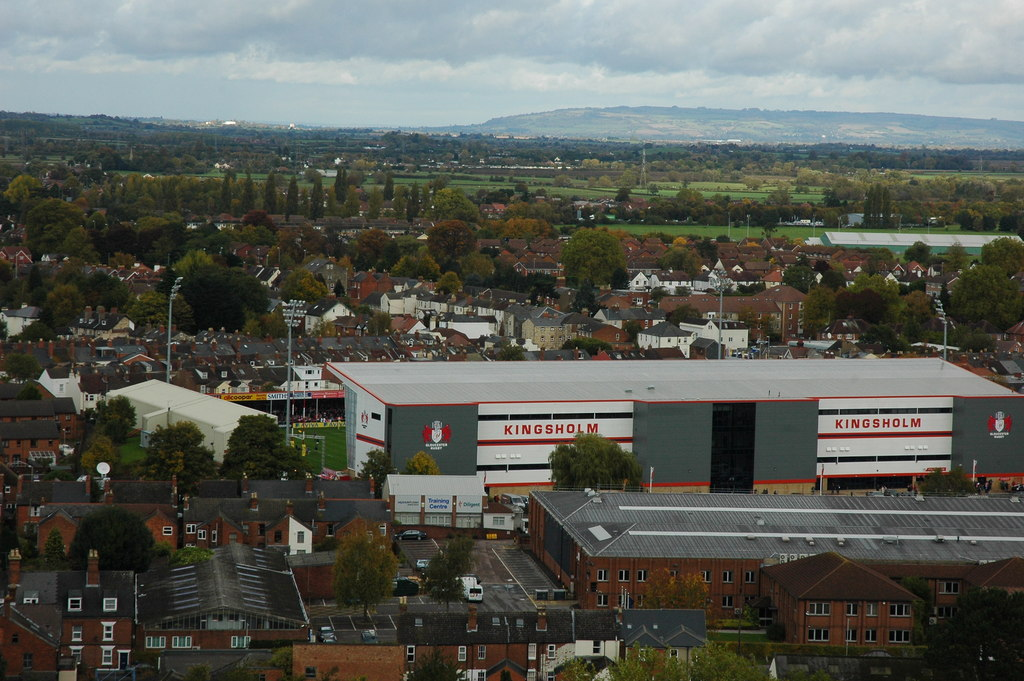
Aerial view of Kingsholm from Gloucester Cathedral

A proposal by the then Gloucester Football Club to acquire the grounds where Kingsholm Stadium is built was first put together in July 1891. The purchase was made and the first match took place in October 1891. A pavilion was built in 1892, initially with seating capacity for 424 spectators. A wooden stand was added in 1923. In September 1933, a fire destroyed this stand; a larger replacement was completed before the end of the year in its place. The original pavilion was demolished in 1934 and, in its place, was built the stand that is today known as The Shed.

== International matches ==
In May 2008, the Barbarian F.C. and Ireland national rugby union team played a match at Kingsholm. Kingsholm has hosted multiple other international matches, including one pool game in the 1991 Rugby World Cup and four pool games in the 2015 Rugby World Cup, hosting Tonga, Georgia, Scotland, Argentina, the United States and Japan.

List of men's and women's international rugby union matches at Kingsholm Stadium
Date	Country	Score	Country	Use
6 January 1900	England	3–13	Wales	1900 Home Nations Championship
8 October 1991	New Zealand	46–6	United States	1991 Rugby World Cup
27 May 2008	Ireland	39–14	Barbarians	Uncapped match
12 June 2011	England Saxons	41–14	Tonga	Churchill Cup
15 November 2014	Tonga	40–12	United States	2014 End-of-year test
5 September 2015	Japan	13–10	Georgia	World-cup warm up game
19 September 2015	Georgia	17–10	Tonga	2015 Rugby World Cup
23 September 2015	Scotland	45–10	Japan	2015 Rugby World Cup
25 September 2015	Argentina	54–9	Georgia	2015 Rugby World Cup
11 October 2015	United States	18–28	Japan	2015 Rugby World Cup
9 April 2022	England	58–5	Wales	2022 Women's Six Nations Championship
7 September 2024	England		France	2024 WXV warm up game

Kingsholm was also one of the venues for the 2000 Rugby League World Cup where, on 29 October, it hosted the group 2 game between New Zealand and Lebanon. The New Zealand team included future rugby union converts and Gloucester Rugby players, Henry Paul and Lesley Vainikolo.

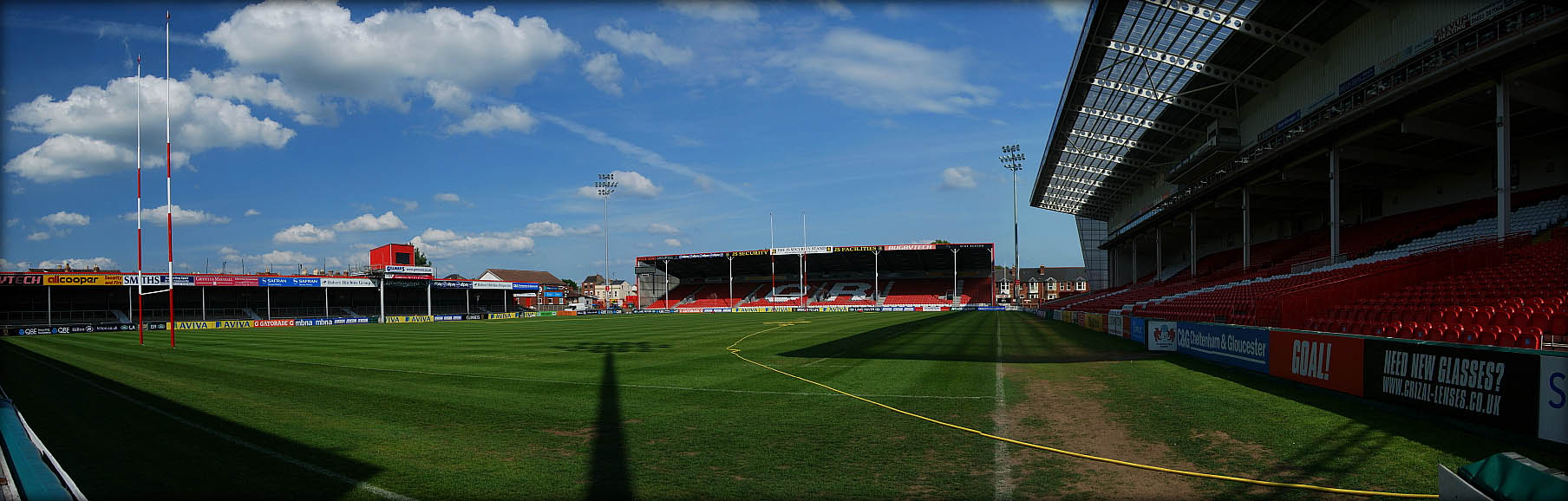
Panoramic view of the stadium in 2011

== Concerts ==
Kingsholm regularly hosts pop concerts, generally when the season has ended. The stadium has hosted acts ranging from Tom Jones, McFly, Ronan Keating and The Wanted. In 2015 it hosted Madness and Elton John 2016 Jess Glynne and Lionel Richie and in 2017 Little Mix.

== Football ==
Kingsholm Stadium hosted several football matches for Gloucester City A.F.C. in the 1910s. Since the football club's 3rd major flooding in 17 years in 2007 at Meadow Park and subsequent exile from the city, Kingsholm had been discussed as both a temporary and permanent solution but no mutual agreement was found. Further flooding occurred at the stadium in 2017.

== Development ==
Kingsholm Stadium Plan

In October 2003, Gloucester Rugby launched 'Project Kingsholm'. 'The Kingsholm Supporters Mutual' (KSM) was set up by Gloucester Rugby Football Club in October 2003, to help fundraise towards 'Project Kingsholm', the redevelopment of Gloucester's entire ground at a cost of £6,000,000, and the launch of a supporters shares rights issue. The idea was to be similar to the development at Franklin's Gardens, home of Northampton Saints, although on a bigger scale, incorporating both seating and terracing. Despite the KSM meeting the fundraising targets, Gloucester Rugby abandoned all plans. In 2006, the club announced it would be making an extension to Kingsholm, bringing the stadium capacity up to 16,500. This was mainly to comply with Premier Rugby's minimum seat number requirements. The old main Grandstand (which was both terracing and seating) was later replaced by a new all seater structure, while terracing on the Worcester Street end of the ground was developed into an all seater stand, known as the 'Buildbase' stand at the time.

In January 2007, the club announced plans to redevelop The Shed terracing to all seater. This was intended to enable the entire stadium to become all-seating. A large number of supporters did not want to see this happen under the proposals put forward by Gloucester Rugby, and a poster campaign under the name of 'Save Our Shed' or 'SOS' was initiated by the KSM, and sponsored by the Gloucester Citizen newspaper. Posters were held up by supporters standing in the Shed, on camera during a televised Heineken Cup match against Leinster Rugby at Kingsholm. T-shirts were also made independently by supporters, with the slogan 'Save Our Shed' printed on them. The campaign did not protest the redevelopment of the Shed, rather the plans put forward at the time which were to replace all terracing with seats, leaving no alternative anywhere in the ground, despite such a large demand for terracing. In September 2008, chairman Tom Walkinshaw confirmed there were plans for the Shed to be redeveloped, but it would remain as a terrace (with an increased capacity of 6000), with hospitality units above it. However, as of the 2010/11 season, the need and desire for redeveloping the Shed decreased with the above-mentioned plans proving to be conjecture, and as such abandoned, have never come into effect and do not appear to for the foreseeable future.

In 2007, the club reject the proposal of moving to a brand new 15,000 capacity community stadium in an area of the city nicknamed 'The Railway Triangle' off Metz Way. This was intended to be shared with Gloucester City A.F.C.. The stadium would have been designed to allow for further development to hold up to 25,000 fans.

In 2017 it was announced that "The Shed" would be renamed Greene King Shed following a sponsorship deal with the brewer Greene King. This deal was superseded in 2021 by a new deal with medical supplier Compeed meaning the stand became The Compeed Shed ahead of the 2021–22 season. A new artificial surface was also laid ahead of the 2021–22 season.
