= Lomelin (surname) =

Lomelin is a surname. Notable people with the surname include:

- Carlos Salazar Lomelín (born 1951), Mexican businessman
- Pedro de Barrientos Lomelin (died 1658), Roman Catholic bishop
