= SUMAQ =

Academic alliance in Spain

SUMAQ is an academic alliance comprising eight leading business schools in Latin America and Spain.

It was founded in 2002 by IE Business School as a response to the needs of executive education in growing multinationals.

== Mission ==
According to SUMAQ, its mission is:

Sumaq offers the experience of member schools in the field of executive education, a formidable resource pool (over 1,200 professors and specialists from different sectors spread over 11 campus situated in different countries) and an extensive knowledge of business environments in Europe and Latin America.

— SUMAQ Alliance

== Members ==
- IE Business School (Madrid, Spain)
- University of the Andes, Colombia (Bogotá, Colombia)
- Instituto de Estudios Superiores de Administración (Caracas, Venezuela)
- University of San Andres (Buenos Aires, Argentina)
- EGADE (several locations in Mexico and Latin America)
- INCAE (Alajuela, Costa Rica and Managua, Nicaragua)
- EAESP, Fundação Getúlio Vargas (São Paulo, Brasil)
- Pontifical Catholic University of Chile (Santiago, Chile)
