= Ashwin Sanghi =

Indian writer (born 1969)

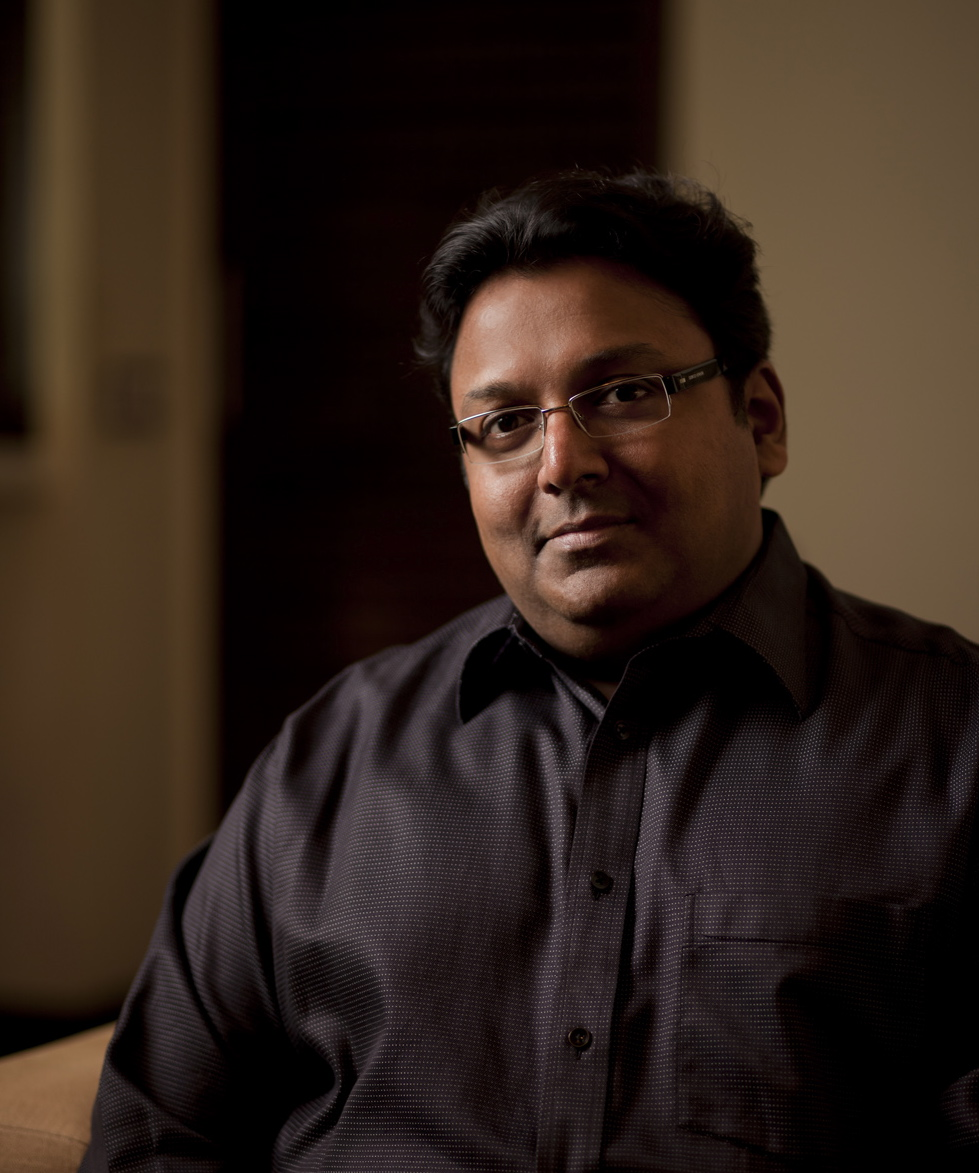
- Born: 25 January 1969 (age 57); Mumbai, Maharashtra, India
- Education: The Cathedral & John Connon School, St. Xavier's College, Mumbai, Yale University
- Occupations: Author, entrepreneur
- Spouse: Anushika Sanghi
- Writing career
- Genres: Thriller, mystery fiction, conspiracy fiction
- Notable works: The Rozabal Line; Chanakya's Chant; The Krishna Key
- Website: www.ashwinsanghi.com

Ashwin Sanghi (born 25 January 1969) is an Indian writer. His novels include The Rozabal Line, Chanakya's Chant, The Krishna Key, The Sialkot Saga, Keepers Of The Kalachakra, The Vault of Vishnu, and The Magicians of Mazda.

== Biography ==
Sanghi studied at the Cathedral & John Connon School in Mumbai. He attended St. Xavier's College at the University of Mumbai and graduated with a BA in economics and an MBA from the Yale School of Management. He joined his family's business, the M. K. Sanghi Group, in 1993.

He wrote his first novel in 2006. In 2014, Sanghi and James Patterson co-wrote a thriller titled Private India for Patterson's Private series.

== Critical acclaim ==
Sanghi has received positive feedback from writers and the media.

== Bibliography and adaptations ==
=== Bharat Series ===
- The Rozabal Line: First published under the anagram Shawn Haigins.
- Chanakya's Chant: Available in 4 languages - English, Hindi, Telugu, and Tamil.
- The Krishna Key: also available in English, Hindi, Telugu, and Tamil.
- The Sialkot Saga (2016)
- Keepers Of The Kalachakra(2018).
- The Vault of Vishnu (2020)
- The Magicians of Mazda (2022)
- The Ayodhya Alliance (2025)

=== Private Series (co-written with James Patterson) ===
- Private India, or Private India: City on Fire (2014): co-written with James Patterson, within Patterson's Private series. New York: Grand Central Publishing ISBN 978-1-4555-6081-3

- Private Delhi, or Count to Ten: A Private Novel (2017): co-written with James Patterson.

=== 13 Steps Series ===
- 13 Steps To Bloody Good Luck.
- 13 Steps To Bloody Good Wealth.
- 13 Steps To Bloody Good Marks.
- 13 Steps to bloody Good Health.
- 13 Steps to bloody Good Parenting.

=== Kutta Kadam Series ===
- Razor Sharp (2024).

== Awards ==
- The inaugural Jigme Singye Wangchuck (JSW) Prize in Literature was awarded at the Bhutan Echoes: Drukyul's Literature and Arts Festival in Thimphu, Bhutan on 01 August 2026. The citation read, "The inaugural JSW Prize in Literature is proudly conferred upon Mr. Ashwin Sanghi, celebrating his exceptional literary achievement and contribution to literature".
- The 2010 Vodafone-Crossword Popular Choice Award was awarded to Sanghi's novel Chanakya's Chant. The winner of this award is decided by readers' votes online.
- Private India made it to UK Top Bestseller List.

== See also ==
- Amish Tripathi
- Ravinder Singh
- Piyush Jha
