= Compeed =

Brand of hydrocolloid plasters

- Current owner: HRA Pharma (2017)
- Country: Denmark
- Introduced: 1986
- Markets: World
- Previous owners: Coloplast
- Website: www.compeed.com

Compeed (contraction of "Competition" and "Seed") is a brand of hydrocolloid gel plasters for treating blisters, corns, cracked heels and cold sores. It was originally developed by Lars Backsell while working in Denmark for Coloplast A/S. The brand was sold to Johnson & Johnson in May 2002, then acquired by HRA Pharma in 2017. Compeed plasters are still manufactured by Coloplast.

The product was originally designed for treating ostomy patients.

== History ==
In 1984, Lars Backsell, while working as a General Manager at Coloplast, conducted a clinical trial with the Swedish army to test a prototype that developed a skin barrier for bandaging purposes based on hydrocolloid technology. The initial product used an ostomy sheet and was sold as a blister-protective bandage through pharmacies to consumers.

In 1986, Compeed was first sold in Sweden before being registered in the United States in the category of antiseptic cleaning tissues as a trademark under serial number 73589785. Compeed got Food and Drug Administration-approval in 1988.

In 2002, "Compeed X-TREME Flex" plaster by Jan Marcussen was included in the art museum MoMA design collection. The brand was later sold to Johnson & Johnson in May 2002.

In 2004, "Compeed X-TREME Flex" plaster won the Danish Design Award. In 2007, Compeed was awarded Nicholas Hall's New Product of the Year.

== Technology ==
The hydrocolloidal plaster contains croscarmellose sodium (an internally cross-linked sodium carboxymethylcellulose, water-soluble polymer) and tackifier resins. The top level of the plaster is made of elastomer and polyurethane film.

When applied to the blister, it starts to absorb body fluids, turning into a soft mass. It seals the blister, forming the so-called "second skin". The plaster prevents the blister from developing. At first, the plaster absorbs all the moisture from the blister, but over time, it becomes more permeable, so the wound dries out.

== Research ==
Compeed conducts consumer insight research. A 2012 study found that 58 percent of women take off their shoes during a night out because of the pain. It also showed that the average heel worn by British women is 3.3 inches, the highest across Europe.
