= Chanakya's Chant =

Book by Ashwin Sanghi

- First edition cover
- Author: Ashwin Sanghi
- Translator: Mukherjee
- Language: English
- Genre: Novel
- Publisher: Westland Ltd.
- Publication date: 2010
- Publication place: India
- Media type: Print Paperback
- Pages: 448 pp (first edition, paperback)
- ISBN: 978-93-8065-867-4 (first edition, paperback)

Chanakya's Chant (2010) is a novel written by Indian author Ashwin Sanghi. It was written two years after his first novel The Rozabal Line (2008) was released in India. Chanakya's Chant was released on 26 January 2011 and entered all major Indian national bestseller lists within two months. It reached #1 on India Today's bestseller list on 4 April 2011. On 19 June 2011, UTV Software Communications announced that it had acquired the movie rights of the novel.

== Plot summary ==
The year is 340 B.C. A hunted, haunted Brahmin youth vows revenge for the gruesome murder of his beloved father by the Emperor of Magadha, Dhana Nanda. Cold, calculating, cruel and armed with complete absence of accepted morals, he becomes the most powerful political strategist in Bharat and succeeds in uniting a ragged and broken country against the invasion of barbaric army of the Greek demigod, Alexander the Great. Pitting the weak edges of both forces against each other, he pulls off a wicked and astonishing victory and succeeds in installing his disciple Chandragupta Maurya on the throne of the mighty Mauryan empire. History knows him as the brilliant strategist Chanakya. Satisfied - and a little bored - by his success as a kingmaker through the simple summoning of his gifted mind, he recedes into the shadows to write Arthashastra, the science of wealth and tactics.

But history, which exults in repeating itself, revives Chanakya two and a half millennia later, due to a curse put on him by his childhood playmate and crush Suvasini, who was a part of his grand plans. Chanakya takes birth again in the form of Pandit Gangasagar Mishra, a poor Brahmin teacher in a small town of India who becomes a puppeteer to a host of ambitious yet foolish individuals - including a certain slum child-Chandini Gupta, who grows up to be a beautiful, intelligent and a powerful woman. Modern India happens to be just as riven and divided as ancient Bharat by casteist and communal hatred, corruption and divisive politics and this happens to be Gangasagar's feasting ground. Can this wily pandit, who preys on greed, venality and lust, bring about another miracle of a united India? Will the Chanakya Chant work again?

== Literary significance & criticism ==
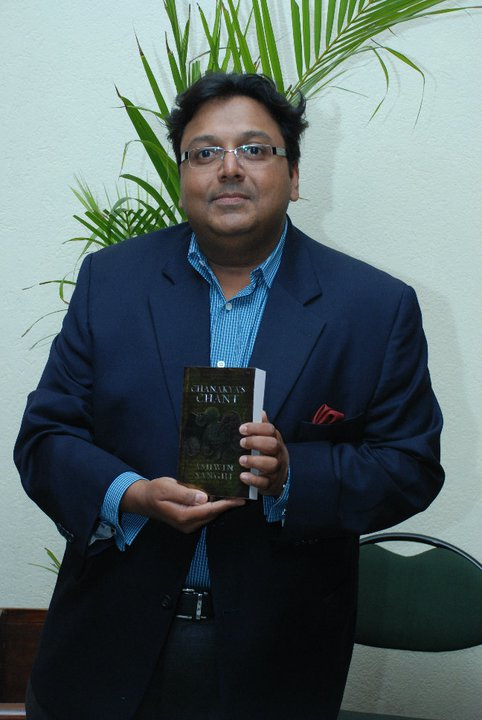
Ashwin Sanghi

The book has been well received by critics. Shashi Tharoor, who released the book in Mumbai, called it "a delightfully interesting and gripping read". According to Tharoor, works of authors like Ashwin Sanghi were the culmination of the process started by Salman Rushdie’s Midnight's Children in which a specifically Indian voice was used to narrate the story, almost as though the author were writing exclusively for Indian audiences. Even though the book is a historical tale, it has been called a contemporary novel that uses colloquial terms.

In an interview with Flipkart, the author clarified that his intention was to write a fast-paced thriller that would entertain more than educate. Some literary observers view the author's work as part of a reawakening in India's mythology.

A review in the book blog INDIAreads described Chanakya's Chant as a very compelling read with very real characters, settings and manoeuvres. "It is much akin to reading a blow by blow account of Indian politics today. Of course as Chanakya’s story so aptly shows, it is not very different from Indian politics 2500 years ago either. So really the scams, scandals, corruption, collateral damage, war mongering, innocent deaths, communal riots – all the ills that we accuse the modern day politicians of - are nothing new. Nor is their use for gaining power a particular characteristic of our “depraved” leaders. Power has always come at a price and the price as Chanakya points out is not just one’s emotions but one’s conscience as well. This is the message that flows out of Chanakya’s Chant."

Ravi Jain of bookGeeks opined, "If you love History and Contemporary Fiction, then Chanakya’s Chant is ideal for you. The two subjects are poles apart and, to combine them and make the outcome interesting is a mountainous task. But, Ashwin Sanghi makes it look effortless and does a perfect job."

The novel won the 2010 Vodafone Crossword Book Award (Popular Award).

== See also ==
- The Rozabal Line
- The Krishna Key
