= Adam Blumenthal =

American businessman

- Education: Harvard College, B.A.; Yale School of Management, M.B.A., 1989
- Occupations: Founder, chairman and managing partner at Blue Wolf Capital Partners

First Deputy Comptroller and CFO at the New York City Comptroller’s office
- In office 2002–2005
- Preceded by: Jane Levine
- Succeeded by: Deborah Gallegos

Adam Blumenthal is an American businessman and private equity firm executive. He is the co-founder, chairman, and managing partner of Blue Wolf Capital Partners, a New York City-based private equity firm he founded with partner Josh Wolf-Powers in 2005.

== Early life and education ==
Adam Blumenthal attended Stuyvesant High School and Harvard College. He was a community organizer in his youth; following his freshman year at Harvard, he took several years off from school to work on the implementation of the Community Reinvestment Act in St. Louis, Missouri, before returning to college. He graduated magna cum laude with a B.A. from Harvard before earning his M.B.A from Yale School of Management in 1989.

== Career ==
In 1989, Blumenthal joined American Capital, a private equity firm where he was the second employee before the firm began institutional fundraising. Blumenthal served on American Capital's board of directors and held several positions including chief financial officer, chief operating officer, president and vice chairman. By the time he left the firm in 2002, American Capital was managing more than $1 billion in assets and was publicly traded on NASDAQ. After leaving American Capital in 2002, Blumenthal became chief financial officer (CFO) at the New York City Comptroller's office. He succeeded Jane Levine in managing the city's pension funds as First Deputy Comptroller and CFO at the NY Comptroller's office under Bill Thompson until 2005.

Blumenthal is currently chairman and managing partner of Blue Wolf Capital Partners, a mid-size private equity firm that he founded in 2005. At Blue Wolf, Blumenthal makes control investments in middle market companies and adheres to Environmental, Social, and Governance principles. He also serves on the board of directors of several Blue Wolf portfolio companies.

Blumenthal received the 2017 Civic Champion Award from the nonprofit New York City-based magazine City Limits for his work to "preserve union workplaces and promote economic development".

In October 2019, Blumenthal conceived of the term "polarization tax" to describe the burden businesses now face amidst challenging political and economic environments, which contrasts with the benefits of the peace dividend in the 1990s.

== Other boards and philanthropy ==
From 2004 to 2007, Blumenthal served on the Yale School of Management's Board of Advisors, and is currently a member of the Advisory Board for Yale's International Center for Finance. In 2009, he was named a Donaldson Fellow at Yale School of Management. He was a trustee and chairman of the investment committee of the United Auto Workers VEBA from 2011 through 2017. He was a trustee and served as chairman of the investment committees at the Community Service Society of New York and Nathan Cummings Foundation.

Blumenthal has helped fund the Adam Blumenthal Fellowship, "a research fellowship to encourage studies of broad-based employee stock ownership and profit sharing in the United States", at the Rutgers University School of Management and Labor Relations.
