= Recipharm =

Swedish pharmaceutical manufacturer

Recipharm AB
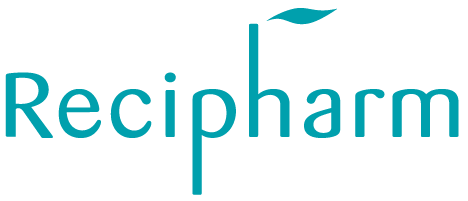
- Formerly: Recip
- Industry: Pharmaceutical Contract Development and Manufacturing Organisation
- Founded: Stockholm, Sweden, 1995
- Headquarters: Stockholm, Sweden
- Key people: Richard Ridinger, Chairman, Greg Behar, CEO, Rodolfo J. Savitzky, CFO
- Products: Pharmaceutical products for humans
- Revenue: SEK 11,069 million (2020)
- Number of employees: 5,200 (2024)
- Website: recipharm.com

Recipharm is a leading global Contract Development and Manufacturing Organisation (CDMO), employing 5,200 people and operating in over a hundred markets worldwide.

Recipharm offers pharmaceutical manufacturing services across various dosage forms, including sterile fill & finish, oral solid dosage, and biologics. Additionally, they provide clinical trial material development and manufacturing services, as well as pharmaceutical product development.

Recipharm manufactures several hundred different products for customers ranging from large pharmaceutical companies to smaller research and development firms.

== History ==
=== Recip 1995-2007 ===
In March 1995, Thomas Eldered and Lars Backsell conducted a management buyout of a Pharmacia solid dose tablet manufacturing facility in Årsta, Stockholm and formed the company Recip. The facility had 130 employees and a turnover of SEK 220 million. The company continued to manufacture pharmaceutical products for Pharmacia during a transition period while it also developed its own products. Recip also began providing contract manufacturing services to other pharmaceutical companies.

In 1997, Recip was believed to be the first pharmaceutical company in the world to certify its entire operations according to the ISO 14001 environmental management system. From 1998, the company began to grow by acquiring facilities in Sweden. The brand name Recipharm was established in 2001 for the growing contract manufacturing part of Recip's business. In 2007, the Recip part of the business and the company's own portfolio were divested to Meda.

=== Recipharm 2007-present ===
Following the sale of Recip, the company focused on its contract manufacturing business. The capital from the sale of Recip was used to make further acquisitions – initially in Europe and later the US and India. Acquisitions were used to broaden the company's offering and customer base, and to enter new markets.

Recipharm became a public listed company on Nasdaq Stockholm in 2014. Between 2014 and 2019, Recipharm's sales grew by an average of more than 30 per cent annually, including a combination of internal growth and acquisitions. In 2020, Recipharm completed its largest acquisition to date. The £505 million takeover of UK-based Consort Medical added around 2,000 employees and ten European facilities to the company, as well as new device capabilities.

In February 2021, Private equity firm EQT acquired Recipharm for $2.1 billion. In March 2021, Mark Funk joined Recipharm as CEO, replacing Thomas Eldered who remains on the Board of Directors. In 2022, Recipharm acquired CDMOs Arranta Bio, Vibalogics, and Genlbet to increase its biologics and virus manufacturing business.

In January 2024, Greg Behar was appointed Chief Executive Officer at Recipharm, succeeding Mark Funk who remains on the Board of Directors. In April 2024, Recipharm sold seven of their manufacturing sites to Blue Wolf Capital Partners and spun-out Bespak as a standalone drug delivery business.

== The Recipharm International Environmental Award ==
Recipharm's International Environmental Award was annually awarded for the best environmental performance or environmental innovation within the pharmaceutical industry or academia. The final award, recognizing the 2020 winner, was presented in 2021.

== External Recognition ==
- 2006 - Environmental Leadership award from the NMC Swedish Association for Sustainable business
- 2012 - Ernst & Young ‘Entrepreneur of the Year prize’ for Best International growth was awarded to Thomas Eldered and Lars Backsell
- 2014 - The Royal Patriotic Society awarded Thomas Eldered and Lars Backsell with the Enterprise medal for outstanding entrepreneurship
- 2015 - The annual SwedenBIO Award was presented to Recipharm for their contribution to Sweden life science during the year
