= The Philanthropist (TV series) =

- Intertitle
- Genre: Action drama
- Created by: Tom Fontana; Charlie Corwin; Jim Juvonen
- Starring: James Purefoy; Jesse L. Martin; Neve Campbell; Krista Allen; Lindy Booth; James Albrecht
- Country of origin: United States
- Original language: English
- No. of seasons: 1
- No. of episodes: 8

Production
- Executive producers: Charlie Corwin; Tom Fontana; Barry Levinson
- Running time: approx. 45 minutes
- Production companies: Levinson/Fontana Company; Original Media; Carnival Films; Universal Media Studios

Original release
- Network: NBC
- Release: June 24 – August 12, 2009

The Philanthropist is an American action drama television series that aired on NBC from June 24 to August 12, 2009. The program was a limited summer series, principally filmed in South Africa. It opened to strong ratings, but saw a drop in viewers in subsequent weeks. The Philanthropist is a Carnival Films production in association with The Levinson/Fontana Company and Original Media. Tom Fontana, Barry Levinson, Peter Horton, Charlie Corwin, Gareth Neame, and Teri Weinberg served as executive producers.

On October 21, 2009, NBC canceled the series after one season.

== Synopsis ==
The title character, Teddy Rist (portrayed by James Purefoy), is a billionaire playboy haunted by the death of his only child. His life changes when he rescues a young boy during a hurricane in Nigeria. As a result, Rist begins using his fortune to personally change the lives of others. The Philanthropist is based loosely on the life of Bobby Sager.

== Cast and characters ==
=== Main ===
- James Purefoy as Teddy Rist – a British billionaire, driven to do good works after the death of his son
- Neve Campbell as Olivia Maidstone – Philip's wife, who runs the company's charitable foundation
- Michael Kenneth Williams as Dax, an Iraq war veteran and Teddy's bodyguard
- Lindy Booth as A.J. Butterfield – the director of special projects at Maidstone-Rist

=== Recurring ===
- Jesse L. Martin as Philip Maidstone – the co-CEO of Rist's company and best friend to Teddy
- Krista Allen as Julia Carson Rist – Teddy's ex-wife
- James Albrecht as Gerard Kim – Teddy's personal assistant

== Episodes ==
No.	Title	Directed by	Written by	Original release date
1	"Nigeria (Part 1)" "Pilot"	Peter Horton	Tom Fontana, Charlie Corwin & Jim Juvonen	June 24, 2009
A successful tycoon, Teddy Rist, decides to use his money and power to help those in need. First, he has to deliver a vaccine to a Nigerian town with sick children.
2	"Myanmar"	Ed Fraiman	Brant Englestein & Lukas Reiter	July 1, 2009
The Maidstone-Rist Company is outed by a human rights organization as having ties to businesses in Myanmar, also known as Burma, where there is oil and gas exploration using forced labor. Teddy decides the only way to conclude whether to continue their business activities in the country is to get advice from Daw May Lin Wai, a revered Burmese democratic leader who has been under house arrest in the country for nearly two decades, with obvious parallels to the real-life Aung San Suu Kyi. During his search for Lin Wai, Teddy meets a young girl (Lucy Brown), desperately in need of a kidney transplant. The girl's father is a suitable donor but he's being kept at a forced labor camp and it is feared that he won't get to his daughter in time to save her life. Back in New York, Philip and Olivia desperately try to explain Teddy's behavior to an irate board of directors.
3	"Paris"	Duane Clark	Hannah Shakespeare	July 8, 2009
On a business trip to Paris with Teddy and her husband, Philip, Olivia runs into an old friend, Isabelle (Linda Hardy). Reminiscing is short lived however, as Isabelle soon admits to being in debt to Bejan, a high powered Parisian man running a sex trafficking ring out of her hotel. Olivia is devastated when Bejan callously kills Isabelle and she is determined to help the other women caught up in the ring. As Teddy investigates, he is horrified to learn the extent of the trafficking that goes on. As he concocts a plan to free the victims, his findings lead him to a house full of abused young girls and Teddy, determined to see justice, will stop at nothing to rescue them.
4	"Nigeria (Part 2)"	Jonas Pate	Tom Fontana	July 15, 2009
Teddy heads back to Kujama, Nigeria, the scene of his philanthropic epiphany. He has opened an oil refinery that will help bring commerce to the small village. However, Teddy's business and philanthropic plans are thrown aside when his respected friend, Doctor Chima Balo, is kidnapped by a local rebel leader, Jonathan Bankole, who disapproves of Teddy's interference in the village. Teddy vows to get Chima back safely but Bankole will only release her if the government pays a huge ransom, forcing Teddy to begin negotiations with a self-righteous General. Meanwhile, in New York, Philip is reflecting on Teddy's newfound charitable character and is keen to indulge in serving others too, by helping an unemployed acquaintance stay afloat while also motivating the man's son to take his schoolwork more seriously.
5	"Kosovo"	John Strickland	John McNamara	July 22, 2009
Teddy takes his ex-wife, Julia Rist (Krista Allen), on a journey as he tells her about his business venture to Kosovo, a country full of depression and poverty since the 1990s when the Serbian army attacked the Albanian Muslims, who make up the majority of the population. In a series of flashbacks, Teddy addresses the locals in Kosovo, explaining that his company would like to invest money in a bauxite halloysite mine which will not only be profitable for Maidstone-Rist but will ensure them a better future. Teddy wants the Serbians and Albanians to work together at the mine and start a business that will better the lives of all those who populate Kosovo. As the Serbians and Albanians refuse to pull together, it's clear their hatred runs deeper than Teddy first thought. AJ and Philip worry Teddy has bitten off more than he can chew.
6	"San Diego"	Charles Beeson	Kyle Bradstreet & Brant Englestein	July 29, 2009
When charitable donations in San Diego are fraudulently charged to Teddy Rist's credit card, Teddy and Dax go on a manhunt to search for the identity thief, following a trail of receipts through fancy hotels, tattoo parlors and strip clubs. Meanwhile, in New York, Olivia and Philip are devastated to find out that the man with whom they've been investing all of the Foundation's money has actually been running a Ponzi scheme – the Maidstone-Rist charitable arm is now in financial jeopardy. Note: At the end of the episode, Rist looks at a wall in his office (that once used to display his expensive painting by Fredrik Oma) that showcases four framed pictures. The pictures are of people he has helped through his philanthropy, supposedly all of which were present in previous episodes. Three of the photographs are of people recognizable to consistent viewers of the show. However, the fourth is of two people, most likely Middle-Eastern or Southeast Asian, in a mountainous region. This leads the viewer to wonder if they missed an episode, which is correct. NBC advertised the previous week that they would air an episode about water delivery between Pakistan and India, but apparently aired the "San Diego" episode before "Kashmir," thereby creating a story inconsistency.
7	"Kashmir"	Andy Wilson	Jim Juvonen	August 5, 2009
Teddy and Philip's college friend, Rhada Shivpuri (Sarita Choudhury), asks for their help to delicately negotiate with both the Indian and Pakistani governments in an attempt to rebuild the region's water system and reopen 'The Line of Control' which divides the ancient land of Kashmir in two. The border restricts trade between India and Pakistan and Rhada hopes, with Teddy and Philip's help, water will be transported to put an end to the severe drought suffered by both countries in the Kashmiri region. Their mission spirals out of control when militants wage an attack on Mumbai, halting their business plan. In an effort to get their operation back on track, Teddy heads into Kashmir on his own but in the process, lands himself in mortal danger. With Teddy missing, Philip and Dax lead the manhunt to find their friend while Olivia and AJ sit anxiously by the phone in New York, praying Teddy will be found in one piece.
8	"Haiti"	Jonas Pate	John McNamara	August 12, 2009
Teddy has come to the impoverished Haiti with his partner, Philip to try and solve an almost-hopeless food shortage. Philip, who was born in Haiti but left at the age of six, is locking horns with a powerful island senator named Jean Beauvais who also happens to be Philip's estranged brother. Philip wants to help Haiti; but Jean wants Haiti to help itself. Common ground between the brothers is marred by years of resentment and mistrust.

== Reception ==
=== U.S. ratings ===
Order	Episode	Rating	Share	Rating/share (18–49)	Viewers (millions)	Rank (Timeslot)	Rank (Night)	Rank (Week)
1	"Pilot"	4.8	9	2.0/6	7.41		4	16
2	"Myanmar"	3.7	7	1.5/4	5.72	2	8	28
3	"Paris"	3.7	7	1.4/4	5.14	3	9	18
4	"Nigeria (Part 2)"	2.8	5	1.1/4	4.35	3	10	24
5	"Kosovo"	3.1	6	1.1/3	4.74	3	9	20
6	"San Diego"	3.1	6	1.4/4	4.95	3	8	15
7	"Kashmir"	2.8	5	1.2/4	4.35	3	8	24
8	"Haiti"	3.2	6	1.2/4	4.68	3	8	25

=== Critical reception ===
On review aggregator Rotten Tomatoes, the first season has an approval rating of 61% based on 23 reviews, with an average score of 6.5/10; the critical consensus reads: "Though it stumbles on its James Bond-esque premise, The Philanthropist is saved by its beautiful cinematography and the enigmatic charisma of its main star, James Purefoy." On Metacritic, the first season has a weighted average score of 60 out of 100 based on 17 critics, indicating "mixed or average reviews".

== Non-US showings and re-airings ==
In December 2010 and January 2011, the show was aired in Australia on 7Two, a Seven Network digital channel. In August 2013 started on Polish TVP1.

== Home media releases ==
The complete series was released on January 5, 2010 on DVD in Region 1. It was released as a two-disc set, with a total running time of 300 minutes.

== Inspiration ==
The Philanthropist is inspired by the hands-on philanthropy of Bobby Sager.
