= The Power of the Invisible Sun =

The Power of the Invisible Sun is a book published on behalf of Bobby Sager as a philanthropic project. It is a collection of photographs from areas of the world stricken by war, such as Afghanistan, Rwanda, Pakistan, Palestine, Sri Lanka, Kenya or Zimbabwe, depicting children living and dealing with conflict. Its aim is to inspire activism through the intimate encounters with those children provided by the images.

As part of this project, comes the initiative of using the benefits coming from the selling of the book to the "Hope is a game-changer project" providing the kids over the most difficult places around the world with indestructible soccer balls as a lasting symbol of hope.

== Sting ==
Sting, friends with Bobby Sager, has been one of the most active partners supporting this project, attending to the Parties to add a value through his recognition among the media. In fact, the power of the invisible sun pays homage to his song "Invisible Sun". He has also written the foreword for the book.
