= Ted Snyder (economist) =

American economist

- Born: July 3, 1953 (age 73); Lewisburg, Pennsylvania, U.S.

Academic background
- Education: University of Chicago (M.A. and Ph.D.); Colby College (B.A.)
- Thesis: “Defensive Efforts and Antitrust Enforcement” (1984)
- Doctoral advisor: Edward P. Lazear

Academic work
- Discipline: Industrial organization, education
- Institutions: Yale University (2011-present); University of Chicago (2001-2011); University of Virginia (1998-2001); University of Michigan (1982-1998); Department of Justice (1978-1982)
- Website: som.yale.edu/faculty-research/faculty-directory/edward-snyder; Information at IDEAS / RePEc

Edward Adams "Ted" Snyder (born 1953) is an industrial organization economist and the William S. Beinecke Professor of Economics and Management at Yale School of Management. He also served as the dean of the Yale SOM from 2011 to 2019 and of (University of Chicago Booth School of Business from 2001 to 2010. Before that he also deaned the University of Virginia Darden Graduate School of Business Administration) and was Senior Associate Dean at University of Michigan Ross School of Business. He is credited with establishing the Global Network for Advanced Management. Him deaning three top business schools led the Financial Times to call him "a serial dean".

Snyder is a strong defender of management education, having stated that the MBA is the most successful professional degree in modern history based on its general value in developing an understanding of (i) markets and competition and (ii) organizations, networks, and leadership. He foresees a greater weight going forward on a “third competency”, i.e., the ability to navigate the complexities within and across societies.

Snyder has been critical of the “students are customers” view of education, and has articulated an alternative view that sets expectations and emphasizes feedback.

Snyder has had extraordinary success with various business school rankings. At Michigan, when he was Senior Associate Dean in charge of the MBA program and part of a team led by B. Joseph White, the school rose to the No. 2 spot on the BusinessWeek rankings. While at Virginia, Darden reached No. 9 in BusinessWeek. When Snyder arrived at Chicago in 2001, the school never had had a No. 1 ranking and was ranked No. 10 in BusinessWeek. In 2006, during his tenure at Chicago, the school moved to No. 1 in BusinessWeek and has continued to hold the position. Chicago also gained two No. 1 rankings in The Economist during his tenure.

Snyder also is a prolific fundraiser. He first developed a reputation for fundraising at Darden, and later was called a business school turnaround specialist by The Wall Street Journal based on his performance at Darden and Chicago Booth.

Early in his career, Snyder worked as an economist for the United States Department of Justice’s Antitrust Division.

== Yale University ==
On July 1, 2011, Snyder became Dean and William S. Beinecke Professor of Economics and Management at Yale School of Management.

In naming him to this position in January 2010, Yale University President Rick Levin stated: "Ted Snyder is widely regarded as the most successful business school dean in the nation. He brings experience, enthusiasm, and vision to the Yale School of Management, and he looks forward to maintaining the school’s tradition of preparing students for leadership in business and society by raising their awareness of the context in which business operates. Ted especially appreciates Yale’s openness to collaboration across its schools and departments and its strong institutional commitment to infusing its educational programs with global experiences and global awareness. Ted is also committed to advancing the curricular innovations begun by the SOM faculty three years ago."

Jim Baron, chair of the faculty search committee, stated said that more than 30 business school deans around the world were called for advice on whom to consider and Mr. Snyder's name was the only one that kept popping up. According to Baron, Ted Snyder "was widely regarded by his peers as having done the best job in the last decade or so."

Snyder's stated aspirations for Yale School of Management are to have the school become recognized as: 1. The business school that is the most involved with its home university: eminent and purposeful Yale University. 2. The most global U.S. business school in ways that are differentiating and meaningful given how the world's economy has developed. 3. The best source of elevated leaders for escalating complexity in all sectors.

Snyder's focus on globalization dates back to his appointment as the inaugural director of the William Davidson Institute at the University of Michigan, whose founding mission was to engage the university in transition economies such as China, India, Russia, and South Africa. During the early and mid-1990s the Davidson Institute worked directly with enterprises in these regions.

=== Global Network for Advanced Management ===
In his first year as Dean of Yale School of Management, Snyder significantly increased the global reach of the school through a number of innovative initiatives. These include Snyder's conceiving of and convening the Global Network for Advanced Management, a network of 29 top business schools from a spanning set of countries. The Global Network's implementation reflects the extreme fragmentation of the management education industry, with over 13,000 business schools in operation worldwide, and the limitations associated with the partnership model by which individual schools work with others on particular programs. The Global Network creates the infrastructure to connect top talent in a flattening world and enables the member schools to collaborate in numerous ways including co-developing cases on global enterprises, project courses, and student projects. The Global Network was officially launched in April 2012.

During his first year at Yale School of Management, the school's faculty and the Yale Corporation approved a new Master of Advanced Management degree program. The one-year program draws applicants exclusively from the Global Network for Advanced Management who have completed at least the core of their MBA or equivalent, for an advanced degree at Yale.

Both the Global Network and the Master of Advanced Management program have broadened the global diversity of the school, incorporating perspectives from countries on the horizon of economic development, including Indonesia, Turkey, Ghana, Ireland, and Brazil.

Snyder also has strengthened the already strong connections between Yale School of Management and Yale University. For example, the business school offers joint courses with the Jackson Institute for Global Affairs and Yale Law School, and the Master of Advanced Management students meet regularly with participants in the Yale World Fellows Program, a complementary group of high-caliber international leaders on campus.

In December 2013, Snyder led the school's move into Edward P. Evans Hall, the current home of Yale School of Management. The campus provides the school with outstanding classroom and function space, as well as state-of-the-art technological capabilities. It also enables the school to grow its three master-level programs (full-time MBA, executive MBA, and Master of Advanced Management) by 70%, which will help the school expand the scope of its programming.

== University of Chicago ==
Snyder served as dean of the University of Chicago Booth School of Business from 2001 until 2010 and as George Shultz Professor of Economics from 2001 until 2011.

During Snyder's time as Dean, Chicago's positioning became clear as a high integrity institution, known for its commitment to the hierarchy of ideas and the extraordinary professional development of its students. Positive outcomes in terms of financial performance, programmatic initiatives, and rankings followed naturally.

Snyder also co-taught "Economic Analysis of Major Policy Issues" with Gary S. Becker and Kevin M. Murphy.

=== Financial performance ===
In November 2009, Snyder was on the receiving end of his second record-setting gift to a business school, the $300M gift from David Booth of Dimensional Fund Advisors to name the University of Chicago Booth School. During the announcement, Snyder identified David Booth as a great marketer, superb entrepreneur, and an extraordinary financial thinker. Snyder's remarks also quoted George Shultz and paraphrased Bob Dylan.

The school's endowment grew from $197M at the start of his tenure to $475M at the end date, not including the effects of David Booth's gift. During his deanship, the cumulative operating surplus at Chicago Booth was $100.4M. This reflected strong performance in terms of program execution, overall management, and development.

The PhD program endowment went from $2.7M in 2001, to over $15.0M as of June 2010. With the help of an array of committed donors, the school increased the MBA student scholarship budget by an average annual increase of 17.1% over nine budget cycles. It also more than doubled number of endowed professorships, and during Snyder's deanship, Chicago Booth enjoyed the highest retention of senior faculty in five decades.

=== Programmatic initiatives ===
During his tenure, Chicago Booth opened a permanent campus in London, was ready for the expansion of its Singapore campus, and opened the $125M Harper Center in Hyde Park, Chicago. The Becker Center and the Initiative on Global Markets were established during his deanship. The school launched the CRSP indices project, which should generate substantial guaranteed license revenues, and also launched the Nielsen Marketing database projects.

=== Rankings ===
Chicago Booth moved from 10th in the Businessweek rankings to 1st, and has held the No. 1 ranking since 2006. The school ranked in the top 10 in 74 of 78 rankings during his deanship. The Economist also ranked it No. 1 twice during his tenure. These rankings were significant for the school; while it had been well-ranked prior to his tenure, it never had received a No. 1 ranking.

== University of Virginia ==
Snyder was the Dean and Charles C. Abbott Professor at the University of Virginia Darden School of Business from 1998 to 2001.

At Darden, he directed an expansion of the school's MBA program, worked to improve the diversity of the student body, and significantly increased the school's executive education offerings. In his decanal role, Snyder was on the receiving end of what was at the time the largest gift in business school history, Frank Batten Sr.’s $60M gift in December 1999 to establish the Batten Institute.

== Other ==
Snyder received his MA in public policy in 1978 and PhD in economics in 1984 from the University of Chicago. After a professional start as an economist with the Antitrust Division of the U.S. Department of Justice, Snyder joined the faculty at the University of Michigan's Ross School of Business in 1982. He served as a faculty member and later as Senior Associate Dean, and was also the founding director of the Davidson Institute at the University of Michigan, which studies emerging markets.

His research interests include industrial organization, antitrust economics, law and economics, and financial institutions. He has published in many academic journals, and at Chicago Booth he co-taught "Economic Analysis of Major Policy Issues" with fellow economists Gary Becker, who was awarded the Nobel Prize in Economics in 1992, and Kevin Murphy, a 2005 MacArthur Fellow. He serves on the Colby College Board of Trustees.

== Family ==
Snyder's father was a World War II bomber pilot and his mother was a high-school teacher.
