= Yale Publishing Course =

Academic program in the publishing industry

Yale Publishing Course (YPC), located on the campus of Yale University in New Haven, Connecticut, is an intensive program for magazine, book and online publishing professionals. The course focuses on teaching leadership skills for today's increasingly global, increasingly digital environment. YPC's curriculum is geared to middle and upper-level professionals from all over the world. Its speakers include publishing and media executives as well as faculty from the Yale School of Management and Yale University Press staff. The Yale Course is the only advanced-level program for senior managers in the publishing industry.

The program combines plenary sessions with smaller group discussions focused on specific issues and case studies. The curriculum includes sessions on such topics as: strategic planning; financial management and entrepreneurship; best practices in the use of new technology and content delivery; legal challenges in multi-platform publishing; licensing and marketing internationally; and the future of digital dissemination. Faculty office hours facilitate one-on-one meetings with students to explore specific questions or challenges.

== History ==
The Yale Publishing Course was founded in 2010 to fill the gap left by the decades-old Stanford University Publishing Course for Professionals. It builds upon the Stanford tradition and concentrates more heavily on the business and management aspects of publishing as a global enterprise. It also provides a strong emphasis on understanding and using the latest advances in technology.

The Yale Publishing Course began in 2010 as a one-week session, with students from all over the United States and 16 other countries. Students represented all areas of publishing including administration, editorial, sales, publicity, marketing, design, production, business, new media, and new product development. For its 2011 program, YPC was expanded to two sessions: one week focusing on magazine and online publishing, and a week-long session focusing on print and digital book publishing.

The course was suspended in 2020 due to the COVID-19 pandemic. It has not run since, announcing in 2022 that it was suspended "for the foreseeable future."
