= Kerwin Kofi Charles =

Guyanese-American professor at the Yale School of Management

- Born: Buxton, Guyana

Academic background
- Education: University of Miami; Cornell University

Academic work
- Discipline: Economics; Labor Economics
- Institutions: Yale School of Management, Harris School of Public Policy, Gerald R. Ford School of Public Policy
- Website: https://som.yale.edu/faculty/kerwin-k-charles/

Kerwin Kofi Charles is the Indra K. Nooyi Dean & Frederick W. Beinecke Professor of Economics, Policy, and Management at the Yale School of Management.

In 2023, he was elected a Fellow of the American Academy of Arts and Sciences and appointed Sir Arthur Lewis Fellow of the American Academy of Political and Social Science. He has served as Vice President of the American Economic Association, President of the Midwest Economic Association, and Chair of the Nominating Committee of the American Economic Association.

His editorial service includes membership on the International Editorial Board of Industrial and Labor Relations Review, the Advisory Board of the Journal of Economic Perspectives, and the Editorial Board of the Journal of Labor Economics. He previously served as an Associate Editor of The Journal of Human Resources. He also serves on the Executive Committee of the Institution for Social and Policy Studies and previously served on the Board of Trustees of the Panel Study of Income Dynamics.

He is also a research associate at the National Bureau of Economic Research and an elected Fellow of the Society of Labor Economists, has served as Chair of the Board of Trustees of NORC, and is a member of the Federal Economic Statistics Advisory Committee.

He was previously the Edwin A. and Betty L. Bergman Distinguished Service Professor of the Harris School of Public Policy at The University of Chicago, and was a professor at the University of Michigan from 1995 - 2006.

== Deanship ==
On December 5, 2019, Charles announced that the Yale School of Management had received the largest gift in its history—$100 million to fund programs devoted to strengthening leadership in public school systems. The gift came from The Eli and Edythe Broad Foundation and established the Broad Center at the Yale School of Management. The new center oversees a new master's degree in Education Management and executive training for top leaders in public school systems—both tuition-free. In 2026, The Broad Center at Yale SOM launched a data repository on school superintendents and administrators, helping researchers identify leadership effectiveness in K-12 education.

== Research ==
Charles' work has focused on a variety of topics related to applied microeconomics, labor markets, and race/gender, including earnings and wealth inequality, conspicuous consumption, race and gender labor market discrimination, the intergenerational transmission of economic status, worker and family adjustment to job loss and health shocks, non-work among prime-aged persons, and the labor market consequences of housing bubbles and sectoral change.

Collaborating with Patrick Bayer, he studied earnings differences between black and white men in the U.S. between 1940 and 2014. The study found that the median black-white earnings gap was the same in 2014 as it had been in 1950. However, they also found that black men higher in the income distribution narrowed the gap, mainly due to advances by those with a college education.

With Erik Hurst and Matthew J. Notowidigdo, he found that the housing boom that preceded the Great Recession depressed college enrollment as young people opted into the labor market, a trend that was only partially reversed during the subsequent housing crash.

In work with Erik Hurst and Nikolai Roussanov, he has found that Black and Hispanic Americans spend more on visible consumption and automobile expenses: "Conspicuous consumption" than White Americans, and that some of this difference appears to be motivated by an attempt by Black Americans to appear wealthier than they actually are.

In work with Ming-Ching Luoh, he has found that the high incarceration rates of black men affect marriage rates and non-marital childbearing among Black families in the United States.

In recent research with Jonathan Guryan and Jessica Pan, using decades of Census and General Social Survey data, he has shown that the careers of white women in the United States are influenced by the level of sexism in their states of birth.

=== Selected works ===
- Anderson, D. Mark, Kerwin Kofi Charles, Claudio Las Heras Olivares, and Daniel I. Rees. 2019. "Was the First Public Health Campaign Successful?" American Economic Journal: Applied Economics, 11 (2): 143–75.
- Charles, Kerwin Kofi, Erik Hurst, and Matthew J. Notowidigdo. 2018. "Housing Booms and Busts, Labor Market Opportunities, and College Attendance." American Economic Review, 108 (10): 2947–94.
- Charles, Kerwin Kofi, Erik Hurst, and Nikolai Roussanov. "Conspicuous consumption and race." The Quarterly Journal of Economics 124, no. 2 (2009): 425–467.
- Charles, Kerwin Kofi, and Erik Hurst. "The correlation of wealth across generations." Journal of Political Economy 111, no. 6 (2003): 1155–1182.
- Barsky, Robert, John Bound, Kerwin Kofi Charles, and Joseph P. Lupton. "Accounting for the black–white wealth gap: a nonparametric approach." Journal of the American Statistical Association 97, no. 459 (2002): 663–673.
- Charles, Kerwin Kofi, and Melvin Stephens Jr. "Job displacement, disability, and divorce." Journal of Labor Economics 22, no. 2 (2004): 489–522.

== Personal ==
Charles was born in Buxton-Friendship, Guyana, the son of Reuben Charles, former Chief Fisheries Officer, and Mrs. Paulette Charles, a former educator. He provides an annual prize in memory of his grandmother to students attending schools in his hometown who have outstanding performance on the Grade Six Examinations.
