= Global Network for Advanced Management =

Collaboration of graduate schools of business

The Global Network for Advanced Management is a collaboration of graduate schools of business that seeks to foster intellectual ties among business schools, students and deans from both economically strong regions and those on the horizon of economic development. It was founded by a consortium of 21 schools and launched on April 27, 2012. The Global Network has since expanded to include 32 member schools.

== Objectives ==
The Global Network for Advanced Management was founded on the premise that enterprises need leaders who understand how markets and organizations work in increasingly diverse and complex contexts. The network provides an organizational structure to facilitate connections among faculty, students, and alumni from diverse regions, cultures, and economies in different phases of development. Chief goals are the exchange of ideas, collaboration on data collection, and the promotion of research in areas of interest to global commerce. Member schools share course materials, including case studies that incorporate specialized regional expertise.

== Activities ==
The Global Network is a platform for innovation, hosting programs that include Global Network Weeks, which give students at network schools the opportunity to travel to another Network school for a one-week intensive mini-course that takes advantage of localized expertise; Global Network Courses, online graduate-level business courses that connect students at member schools in group project work; and Global Network cases, teaching materials that examine business challenges from the points of view of at least two Global Network regions.

In January 2014, as part of the “Business + Society: Leadership in an Increasingly Complex World,” conference, which marked the opening of Edward P. Evans Hall, the new home for the Yale School of Management, deans and directors from nine Global Network schools discussed the skills they believed critical to leaders with moderator Margaret Warner in a panel entitled "Preparing Leaders for a Flatter World." Faculty, deans, and students from three network schools participated in "Bank of Ireland: A Raw Case Study" with American investor Wilbur Ross.

As of 2023, more than 14,500 students have participated in a Global Network Week and more than 6,500 have taken one of the Small Network Online Courses (SNOCs). More than 5,000 students from 20 of the member schools have participated in the Global Virtual Teams course.

== Members ==
The network includes graduate management schools on six continents:

EUROPE, MIDDLE EAST, AFRICA

- ESMT Berlin, Germany
- HEC Paris, France
- IE Business School, IE University, Spain
- IMD Business School, Switzerland
- Koç University, Turkey
- Kozminski University, Poland
- Lagos Business School, Pan-Atlantic University, Nigeria
- Saïd Business School, University of Oxford, United Kingdom
- SDA Bocconi School of Management, Bocconi University, Italy
- Strathmore Business School, Strathmore University, Kenya
- Technion – Israel Institute of Technology, Israel
- Michael Smurfit Graduate Business School, University College Dublin, Ireland
- University of Cape Town Graduate School of Business, South Africa
- University of Ghana Business School, Ghana

AMERICAS

- EGADE Business School, Tecnológico de Monterrey, Mexico
- Escola de Administração de Empresas de São Paulo, Brazil
- Haas School of Business, University of California, Berkeley, United States
- INCAE Business School, Costa Rica
- Pontifical Catholic University of Chile School of Business, Chile
- UBC Sauder School of Business, University of British Columbia, Canada
- Yale School of Management, Yale University, United States

ASIA PACIFIC

- Asian Institute of Management, Philippines
- Renmin University of China, School of Business, China
- Fudan University School of Management, China
- Hitotsubashi University Business School, School of International Corporate Strategy, Japan
- Hong Kong University of Science and Technology Business School, Hong Kong SAR China
- Indian Institute of Management Bangalore, India
- National University of Singapore Business School, Singapore
- Seoul National University Business School, South Korea
- University of Indonesia Faculty of Economics, Indonesia
- UNSW Business School, Australia
