= EGADE Business School =

- Escuela de Graduados en Administración y Dirección de Empresas
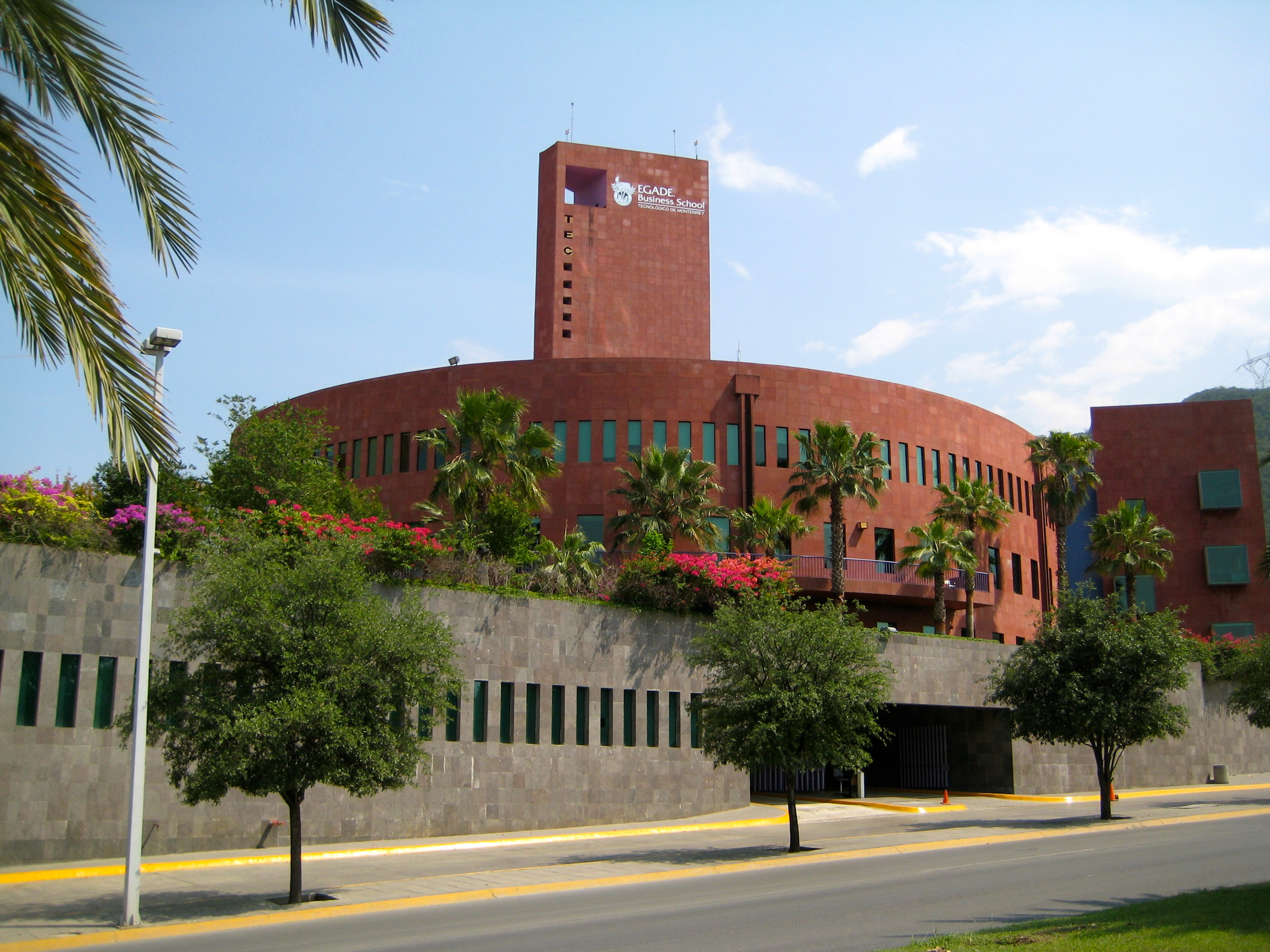
- Campus San Pedro Garza García, Nuevo León.
- Type: Private, non-profit
- Established: 1995; 31 years ago
- Parent institution: Tecnológico de Monterrey
- Affiliations: AACSB, AMBA, EQUIS, SACS (through Tecnológico de Monterrey), Global Network for Advanced Management, Partnership in International Management, PRME Champion
- Dean: Horacio Arredondo Villalba (since 2022)
- Academic staff: c. 70 full-time (2025)
- Postgraduates: 1,447 (2025)
- Doctoral students: 69 (2025)
- Location: San Pedro Garza García, Nuevo León, Mexico; 25.643345°N 100.325679°W
- Campus: Monterrey, Mexico City (Santa Fe), Guadalajara and Querétaro
- Website: egade.tec.mx

EGADE Business School is the graduate business school of Tecnológico de Monterrey, a private Mexican university founded in 1943 and considered among the most important in Latin America. It was formally founded in 1995 under the name Escuela de Graduados en Administración y Dirección de Empresas (EGADE), as a graduate unit of the Monterrey campus, although its academic origins date back to the Escuela de Graduados en Administración, a graduate program founded on 1 September 1964 at the Monterrey campus with partial financial support from the Ford Foundation, within the framework of the Alliance for Progress promoted by the United States in Latin America.

In 2010, Tecnológico de Monterrey carried out a reorganization of its graduate business studies that consolidated the schools of several campuses into a single national entity under its current name, EGADE Business School. Its main campus is located in San Pedro Garza García, Nuevo León, in a 32,000m2 building opened in 2001 and designed by Ricardo Legorreta. The firm also designed EGADE's building on the Santa Fe campus in Mexico City, opened in 2010. The school also operates sites in Guadalajara and Querétaro.

EGADE Business School is accredited by the three main international accreditation agencies: the Association to Advance Collegiate Schools of Business (AACSB), the Association of MBAs (AMBA) and the European Quality Improvement System (EQUIS) of the European Foundation for Management Development. In 2008, its Monterrey campus became the first business school in Mexico and the fourth in Latin America to simultaneously obtain all three accreditations, a distinction held at the time by fewer than forty institutions worldwide.

The school is consistently ranked among the top positions in Latin American MBA rankings by publications such as the Financial Times and QS Quacquarelli Symonds. In the 2026 edition of the QS Global MBA Ranking, its Full-Time MBA was recognized as the best in Latin America, for the ninth consecutive year in that position, and remained within the global top 60. In the Financial Times Online MBA ranking 2026, the EGADE MBA Online placed 16th worldwide, the only Latin American business school included in that edition.

EGADE Business School is also one of the schools through which Tecnológico de Monterrey operates its research program, being responsible for the field of business. In the QS World University Rankings by Subject 2026, Tecnológico de Monterrey ranked first in Latin America in Social Sciences and Management (28th worldwide), and also led the region in Business and Management Studies (22nd worldwide), Marketing (17th worldwide) and Accounting and Finance (55th worldwide), being the leading university in the region in all of these disciplines.

== History ==
=== Origins ===
The academic antecedents of EGADE Business School date back to 1964, when Tecnológico de Monterrey established the Escuela de Graduados en Administración (Graduate School of Management) at its Monterrey campus, offering the country's first Master's program in Business Administration. The project received partial financial support from the Ford Foundation within the framework of the Alliance for Progress. The initiative was part of a broader generation of graduate business schools founded across the Americas during the same period with the support of American foundations and universities.

The master's program began with 37 part-time students and grew rapidly: four years later enrollment exceeded 390 students, including participants from several countries. In the early 1970s, an academic restructuring of Tecnológico de Monterrey centralized departments around academic divisions and graduate programs were transferred to local campuses, whereby the school ceased to exist as an independent unit.

Over the following two decades, the institution continued to pioneer internationalization with programs in collaboration with the University of California, Los Angeles and the University of Texas at Austin, and in the early 1990s it established the Doctorate in Administration at its Monterrey and Mexico City sites, a program that would later evolve to train researchers with a global focus.

=== Expansion and consolidation ===
The summer of 1995 marked the beginning of a new stage for graduate business education at Tecnológico de Monterrey. The Escuela de Graduados en Administración y Dirección de Empresas (EGADE) was formally created as a unit of the Monterrey campus, under the leadership of its founding dean Jaime Alonso Gómez Aguirre.

From its early years, the school focused on academic internationalization as a driver of growth. The first cohort of the dual-degree Executive MBA was launched in partnership with the McCombs School of Business of the University of Texas at Austin, at the Mexico City campus, and the institution quickly established itself as a host of regional academic conferences: in 1996 it hosted the international conference of the Business Association of Latin American Studies (BALAS), and the following year it hosted the first joint conference of the Latin American Council of Management Schools (CLADEA) and the Academy of International Business (AIB). In 1998, the school obtained accreditation from the Association to Advance Collegiate Schools of Business (AACSB), its first international accreditation.

Architectural and institutional consolidation came with the turn of the century. In 2001 the current campus in San Pedro Garza García were inaugurated, a building designed by the firm of Ricardo Legorreta that became an architectural landmark of the institution.

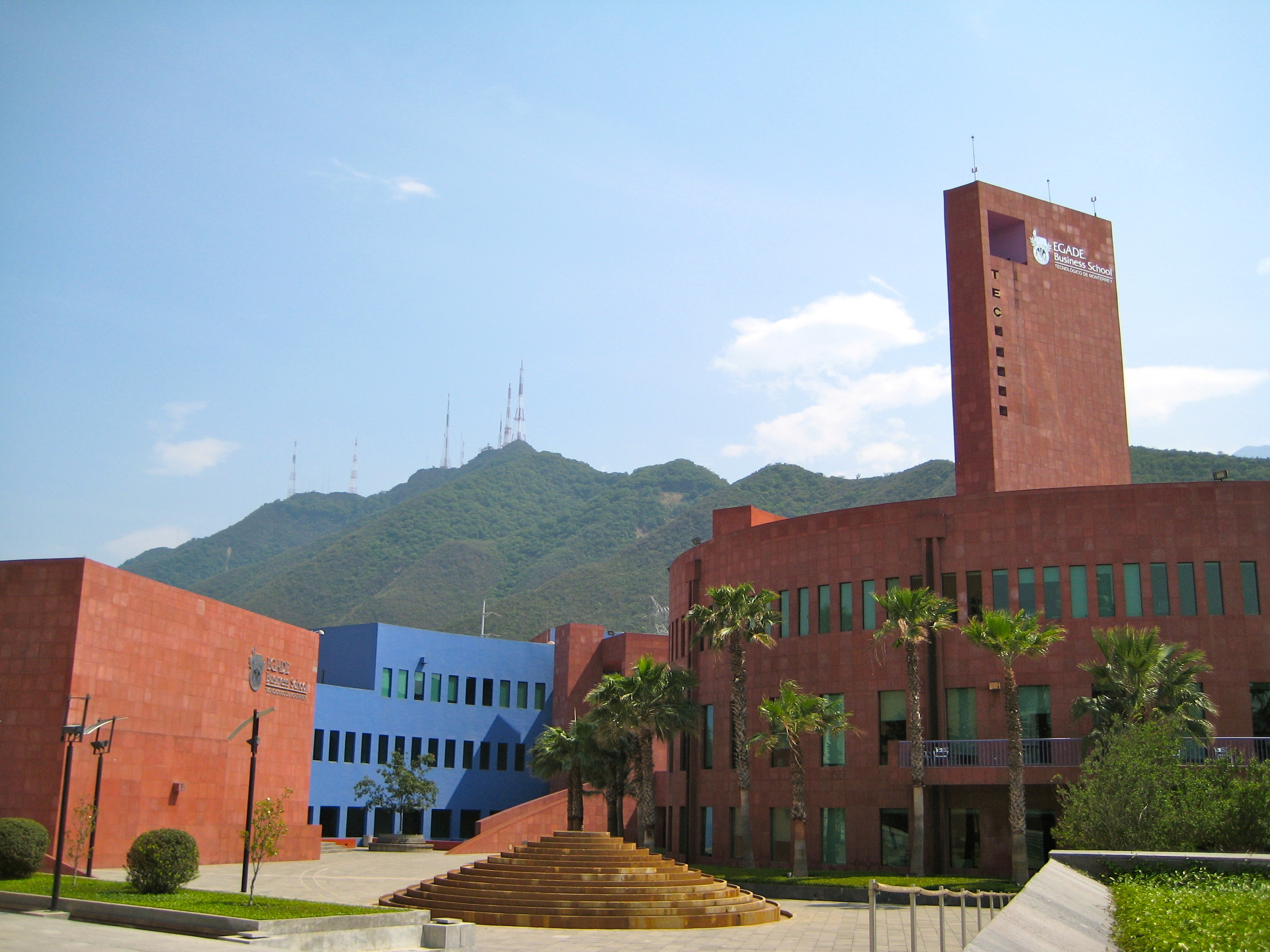
Inside its Monterrey campus in San Pedro Garza García.

At the same time, the school accelerated its internationalization, becoming a co-founding school of the OneMBA consortium, an Executive MBA program delivered jointly with the University of North Carolina Kenan-Flagler, the Rotterdam School of Management, the University of Hong Kong and the Getulio Vargas Foundation; that same year, The Wall Street Journal highlighted the school among the top thirty in the world according to employers' assessments. EQUIS accreditation, granted by the European Foundation for Management Development, followed, along with new dual degrees with Pompeu Fabra University and the Belk College of Business of the University of North Carolina at Charlotte.

The culmination of this cycle came in 2008 with AMBA accreditation for the Monterrey site, making EGADE the first business school in Mexico and the fourth in Latin America to be accredited by the three main international accreditation agencies.

=== Global outreach ===
The most significant transformation in the school's institutional structure took place in 2010, when Tecnológico de Monterrey reorganized its graduate business studies and consolidated the schools of several campuses into a single national entity under the current name of EGADE Business School. That same year, the FEMSA building on the Santa Fe campus in Mexico City was inaugurated, also designed by Ricardo Legorreta, housing the school and the campus General Library.

The new institutional configuration was reflected in its governance. The following year, the EGADE Business School Board was constituted and María de Lourdes Dieck-Assad assumed the deanship, a position she held until 2016. As a consolidated multi-site school, EGADE renewed its commitment to quality in 2013 by maintaining all its accreditations, and during that same period it became a founding member of the Global Network for Advanced Management (GNAM).

In 2016, the EGADE Business School chapter of the international honor society Beta Gamma Sigma was established and the EGADE MBA was launched at the Querétaro campus. That same year, Juan Pablo Murra Lascurain assumed the deanship, also taking on the leadership of Tecnológico de Monterrey's School of Business, a role that would later fall to Ignacio de la Vega.

In 2019, the school diversified its academic portfolio with the launch of the Master in Business Management aimed at recent graduates. That same year, EGADE Business School was recognized by the QS Global Business Schools Ranking as the best business school in Mexico and Latin America and launched the EGADE MBA Online, the institution's first fully digital graduate program. The ecosystem of strategic centers and research groups also began to take shape, which in later years would give rise to the Institute for Business Families for Mexico and Latin America and the Center for Conscious Enterprises.

A new strategic stage began with the appointment of Horacio Arredondo as dean in 2022 and the launch of the 2030 Strategic Plan, built around the purpose of "Rethinking the future of business to impact the sustainable development of Latin America".

In the following years, the institution established two chairs with international academic reach: the UNESCO Chair in Anticipatory Leadership for Innovative and Better Futures, and the Chair in Philanthropy and Impact Investing, with the support of Fundación FEMSA; and it was recognized by the Financial Times as Highly Commended in the Best Schools category of the Responsible Business Education Awards 2024.

=== Governance ===
Headquarters in San Pedro Garza García

EGADE Business School is the graduate business school of Tecnológico de Monterrey. The school's dean reports to the university's rector, a position held since October 2024 by Juan Pablo Murra Lascurain.

The dean leads the school's academic and operational activities. Since June 2022 the position has been held by Horacio Arredondo Villalba, who succeeded Ignacio de la Vega.

=== Advisory bodies ===
The EGADE Business School Board is part of Tecnológico de Monterrey's institutional governance and is composed of business leaders from Mexico and Latin America. It is chaired by Carlos Salazar Lomelín, an alumnus of the school and former chief executive officer of FEMSA.

The EGADE Global Academic Advisory Council (EGAAC), established in 2025, is composed of deans and scholars from international business schools and advises the school's leadership on academic strategy.

== Academic programs ==
EGADE Business School offers graduate programs in business at three levels (MBA, master's and doctoral), as well as a broad portfolio of executive education focused on senior management.

=== MBA programs ===
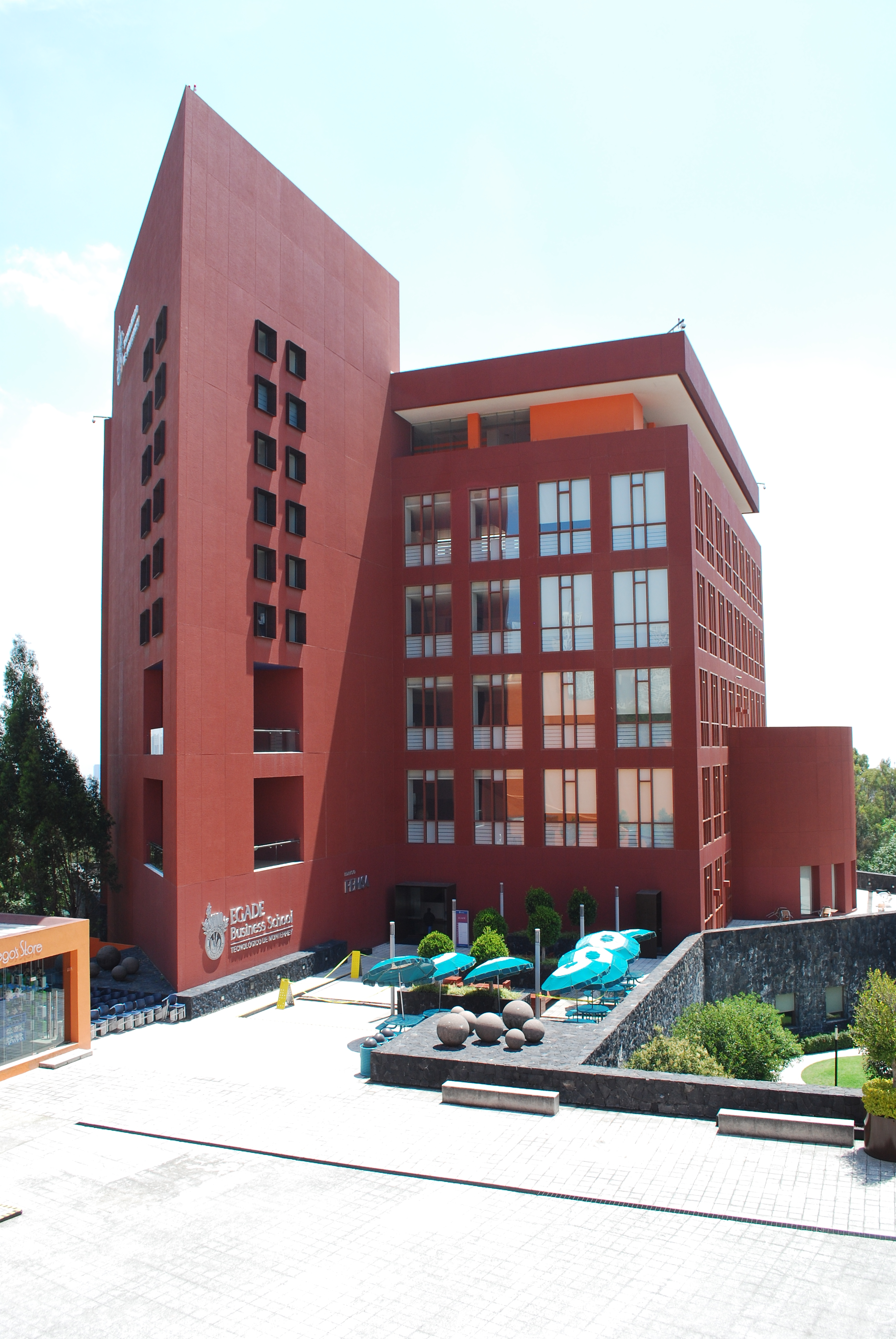
EGADE Business School building on the Santa Fe campus, Mexico City

- Executive MBA, offered in two formats: on-site at the school's campuses in Mexico, and online. Both formats require, among other criteria, at least three years of professional experience.
- EGADE Full-Time MBA, a one-year intensive program delivered at the Monterrey campus for professionals seeking to strengthen their leadership and business skills.
- Global Executive MBA, a dual-degree program delivered jointly with the W. P. Carey School of Business at Arizona State University. Aimed at C-level executives and business owners, it has the most demanding professional-experience requirements in the school's portfolio. In the QS Executive MBA Rankings 2026: Joint Programmes, it ranked first in Latin America and 16th worldwide.

=== Master's programs ===
- Master in Business Management, for recent graduates without prior professional experience.
- Master in Finance, on-site and online.
- Master in Business Analytics.
- Master in Marketing.
- Maestría en Gestión de Negocios (Master in Business Administration and Management).
- Master in Sustainable Business.

=== Doctoral programs ===
EGADE offers two doctoral programs: the Doctorate in Administrative Sciences and the Doctorate in Financial Sciences. Both are part of Mexico's National Graduate Programs System (Sistema Nacional de Posgrados).

=== Executive education ===
EGADE's executive education portfolio is organized into open-enrollment programs and custom programs designed for companies.

In the 2026 Financial Times Executive Education rankings, EGADE Business School placed among the top 50 schools worldwide for open-enrollment programs and among the top 100 for custom programs.

Its flagship programs include:

- Advanced Management Program (AMP), an on-site program for business owners, directors and executives, delivered at all EGADE campuses and, on a rotating basis, at other Tecnológico de Monterrey campuses.
- Formación de Consejeros de Administración, for business owners, shareholders and executives serving on boards of directors, with an emphasis on corporate governance.
- Familias Empresarias Líderes, led by Tecnológico de Monterrey's Institute for Business Families for Mexico and Latin America and aimed at members of business-owning families.

== See also ==
- Monterrey Institute of Technology and Higher Education
