= Carlos Salazar Lomelín =

Mexican businessman

- Born: April 1951 (age 75)
- Education: Monterrey Institute of Technology (ITESM).
- Occupation: Businessman
- Employer: Coca-Cola Femsa
- Term: 1 January 2000–Present.
- Spouse: Luz del Carmen
- Children: Luz del Carmen, Daniela, Alejandra, Andrea and Carla
- Awards: Presea Estado de Nuevo León (2009)

Carlos Salazar Lomelín (born April 1951) is a Mexican businessman who is chief executive officer of Coca-Cola FEMSA since 1 January 2000.

== Early life ==
Salazar graduated with a bachelor's degree in economics (1973) and an MBA (1989) from the Monterrey Institute of Technology (ITESM). He also undertook executive courses in Business Administration and Economic Development at the Instituto di Studi per lo Sviluppo Economico in Naples, and at IPADE, in Mexico City.

== Career ==
During his studies in Italy he interned at Cassa di Risparmio delle Provincie Lombarde.

Salazar joined Femsa in 1973 and rose through the ranks as director-general of Grafo Regia, commercial planning officer of Femsa and chief executive officer of Femsa Cerveza. On 1 January 2000 he was appointed chief executive officer of Coca-Cola Femsa.

Aside from his business activities, Salazar has lectured in Economics at the Monterrey Institute of Technology, where he was president of the corporate advisory board of EGADE Business School (2009-2010).

In June 2011 it was rumored that he would succeed Rafael Rangel Sostmann as rector of that university.
