= Bobby Sager =

American philanthropist and photographer

- Born: February 5, 1954 (age 72); Malden, MA
- Citizenship: American
- Occupations: Photographer and philanthropist
- Notable work: Sager Family Traveling Foundation and Roadshow
- Children: 2
- Parents: Arnold Sager (father); Barbara Sager (mother)
- Awards: YPO Hickok Award YPO Global Humanitarian Award
- Website: https://bobbysager.com

Robert Sager is an American philanthropist and photographer, best known for founding the Sager Family Traveling Foundation and Roadshow, a charitable organization with initiatives in Rwanda, Bhutan, Afghanistan, Nepal, India, Pakistan, and Israel.

== Early life ==
On Friday, February 5, 1954, Robert "Bobby" Sager was born to Arnold and Barbara Sager in Malden, Massachusetts, a suburb of Boston. His father owned a small jewelry business, while his mother was a homemaker who sometimes worked as a small-time activist for local African-American couples having issues renting apartments. Mrs. Sager would rent the apartments on behalf of the couples and later take the landlords to court.

== Education ==
Despite aspiring to become an actor, Sager pursued business, graduating from Brandeis University in 1976 with a degree in Economics, then going on to obtain a Masters of Public and Private Management from Yale University.

== Business ==
In 1985, Sager joined Gordon Brothers Group as a partner and became the company's president. Between 1985 and his departure from Gordon Brothers in 2000, Sager helped the company grow from a $10 million a year business to a multi-billion dollar business with 20 offices in North America, Europe, and Asia. Today Gordon Brothers serves as an international advisory firm with 30 offices across five continents.

Sager is a member of the Young Presidents' Organization. In 2013, Sager was awarded the YPO Hickok Award, its highest honor for a member.

== Philanthropy ==
In 1999, Sager met the musician and activist Sting at a bar in Brazil. Sager was looking for a tour of the interior of the rainforest and asked Sting for contacts. The two kept in touch after that point. In the words of Sting, Sager's frequent travel mate, he is "a big brash guy from Boston...an old Nepal hand, flamboyant eccentric, inexhaustible world traveler, and practical philanthropist."

In 2000, Sager resigned from his position at Gordon Brothers and set up the Sager Family Traveling Foundation and Roadshow, a charitable organization. He, along with his wife Elaine and their two children, travelled internationally to try to make a difference. Through the foundation, Sager and his family lived in villages and cities in developing countries. They set up economic opportunity training and leadership programs. These programs include teacher training, leadership training, micro-enterprise, as well as peace and reconciliation efforts.

Sager brings together groups of international entrepreneurs from different parts of the world through the Young Presidents’ Organization (YPO) so that they can use their networks to collaborate and gain insights. He is a founding chairman of the Young Presidents' Organization (YPO) Peace Action Network, which convenes business leaders from different sides of conflicts. Sager is also the founder of YPO's Presidents' Action Net (PAN), a philanthropic search engine that connects presidents from over 100 countries in order to leverage their efforts around the world. PAN draws from a community of approximately 20,000 presidents whose businesses have aggregate sales that are the equivalent of the world's third largest GNP. Sager is a moderator of both the Indo-Pak Action Forum and the U.S. Arab Action Forum.

== Media and public speaking ==
Sager was an executive producer for A Guide to Recognizing Your Saints, (2006) winner of the Sundance Film Festival Special Jury Prize and inspiration for the NBC primetime show The Philanthropist (2009). Sager is a photographer and has had his work featured in Rolling Stone, Men's Journal, and philanthropic publications. From 2007–2008, 49 of Sager's photos were featured on the reunion tour of The Police during the song "Invisible Sun". The Power of the Invisible Sun (Chronicle Books, 2009) is a collection of his photographs of children in most desperate and war-torn places in the world and a call to action. Sager has spoken at such venues as the United Nations General Assembly Hall, Sydney Opera House, Grand Mosque in Oman, TED Budapest, Palazzo Vecchio Florence and Aiwan-e-Sadr (residence of the President of Pakistan),,

== Recognition ==
In January 2025, Joe Biden awarded Sager the Presidential Citizens Medal, along with nineteen others.

== Recent Exhibitions ==
- Face to Face (Riyadh, Saudi Arabia; 2024)
- Being Human | Global Citizens Forum 2023 (Ras Al-Khaimah, UAE; 2023)
- Being Human | Berlin Photo Week (Berlin, Germany; 2022)
- Invisible Sun | Fotografiska Tallinn (Tallinn, Estonia; 2020–21)
- Power of Hope | UNHCR 70th Anniversary (Virtual; 2019)
- Freedom | 30th Anniversary of the Fall of the Berlin Wall (Berlin, Germany; 2019)
- Invisible Sun | Fotografiska New York (New York, USA; 2017)

== Books ==
- Diriyah Face to Face (2023)
- Invisible Sun (2019)
- Untouched Octaves, with Pakistani poet, Amin Hashwani (2017)
- Beyond the Robe (2013)
- Power of the Invisible Sun (2009)
