= Blue Wolf Capital Partners =

Blue Wolf Capital Partners LLC
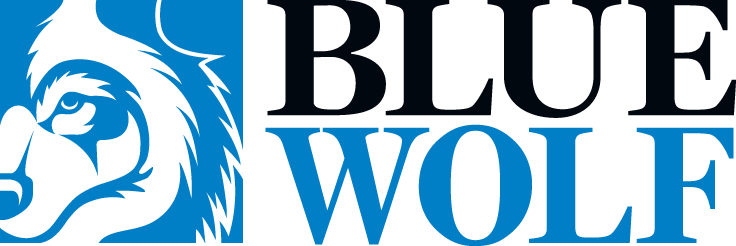
- Type: Private
- Industry: Private Equity
- Founded: 2005
- Founders: Adam Blumenthal; Josh Wolf-Powers
- Headquarters: New York, New York
- Key people: Adam Blumenthal, Chairman and Managing Partner; Jeremy Kogler, Managing Partner
- Products: Leveraged buyout, growth capital, special situations
- Total assets: $2.9 billion
- Website: www.bluewolfcapital.com

Blue Wolf Capital Partners LLC is an American private equity firm based in New York City, New York, founded in 2005 by Adam Blumenthal and Josh Wolf-Powers. Blue Wolf's investments include middle-market companies in health care, forest and building products, as well as in the manufacturing, industrial, and engineering services sectors. The firm has raised four funds to date and manages more than $2.9 billion in capital as of the end of 2022.

== History ==
Blue Wolf Capital Partners was founded in 2005 by Adam Blumenthal, who previously served as first deputy comptroller for New York City and managed American Capital Ltd, and Josh Wolf-Powers, a managing director for private investments for the New York State Comptroller's office. Blue Wolf utilizes Environmental, Social, and Governance principles and integrates them into its value creation strategies. Both Blumenthal and Wolf-Powers initially served as managing partners of Blue Wolf. Wolf-Powers has since left the firm for a career as a psychoanalyst.

Blue Wolf often invests in companies that are regulated by government policies or receive government subsidies and are facing financial distress or labor issues. The firm's strategy usually focuses on acquiring controlling stakes in companies that are involved in complex challenges including leadership transitions, distress or government regulation. It has invested in companies with annual revenue of more than $50 million and enterprise values of $500 million. Its third fund closed in July 2013 after raising more than $300 million. Its fourth fund of $540 million closed in October 2017. Its fifth and most recent fund of $1.1 billion was raised in April 2022.

== Operations and acquisitions ==
Blue Wolf initially acquired several companies including Finch Paper Holdings, Northern Pulp Nova Scotia Corp., and Montauk Energy Capital. In 2008, Blue Wolf's second fund acquired two laundries from Chicago hospitals, merging them into Healthcare Laundry Systems and selling it in 2011 after increasing its volume by 70%. Through this investment Blue Wolf won the 2011 Small Market Deal of the Year award from Buyouts Magazine. The firm had previously won the same award in 2008 for its investment in Montauk Energy Capital.

In 2017, Blue Wolf invested $20 million to revive a sawmill in Glenwood, Arkansas, that had declared bankruptcy during the Great Recession. The company joined the portfolio as Caddo River Forest Products and directly created 130 jobs. In May 2018, Blue Wolf sold Caddo River and Suwannee Lumber Co., which it had invested in 2013, to Conifex Timber for a total of $258 million in cash and shares.

In February 2018, Blue Wolf acquired a majority stake in Petrosmith, an Abilene, Texas-based manufacturer of storage tanks. In April 2018, Blue Wolf announced a merger between two of its home-based care providers – Great Lakes Caring and National Home Health Care — with Jordan Health Services, to create one of the largest providers of home-based care in the nation known as Elara Caring. The new company serves more than 65,000 patients on a daily basis and employs more than 32,500 caregivers in 225 locations in 16 US states.

In May 2019, Blue Wolf acquired Fox Rehabilitation, an in-home medical care provider for seniors under Medicare Part B. In October 2020, Blue Wolf sold Pharmaceutical Strategies Group, a Plano, Texas-based consulting firm for pharmacy benefits to Omnicell for $225 million. In March 2021, Blue Wolf acquired an Oakbrook Terrace, Illinois-based manufacture of caster and wheels, Colson Group.
