= The Rozabal Line =

Novel by Ashwin Sanghi

- The Rozabal Line, Published by Westland Ltd., 2008
- Author: Ashwin Sanghi
- Language: English
- Genre: Thriller, crime, mystery fiction, Historical Fiction
- Publisher: First Edition: Lulu Press (US); Revised Edition: Westland Ltd. (India)
- Publication date: 24 September 2007 (US); 10 November 2008 (India)
- Publication place: India
- Media type: Print & Paperback
- Pages: 311 (US Lulu Press Edition); 373 (India Westland Edition)
- ISBN: 978-1-4303-2754-7 (US Lulu Press Edition); ISBN 978-81-89975-81-4 (India Westland Edition)
- OCLC: 228506596

The Rozabal Line is a thriller fiction novel by Ashwin Sanghi written under the pseudonym "Shawn Haigins". It follows the alternate religious history of Jesus having survived the crucifixion and settled down in India. The title refers to the Rozabal shrine in Srinagar in Kashmir, which some (such as Mirza Ghulam Ahmad, the founder of the Ahmadiyya movement, in 1899) have asserted is the tomb of Jesus of Nazareth. The historical basis is derived from several other books on the subject including Jesus Lived in India by Holger Kersten and The Unknown Life of Jesus by Nicolas Notovich.

== Plot summary ==
A cardboard box is found on a shelf in a London library. When the mystified librarian opens it, she screams before she falls unconscious to the floor. Within the labyrinthine recesses of the Vatican, a beautiful assassin of Asian origin swears she will eliminate all who do not believe in her twisted credo.

An elite army of thirteen calling itself the Lashkar-e-Talatashar has scattered around the globe. The fate of its members curiously resembles that of Christ and his Apostles. Their agenda is Armageddon.

A Hindu astrologer spots an approaching conjunction of the stars and nods to himself in grim realization of the end of the world. In Tibet, a group of Buddhist monks searches for reincarnation, much in the way their ancestors searched Judea for the Son of God. In strife-torn Kashmir, a tomb called Rozabal holds the key to a riddle that arises in Jerusalem and gets answered at Vaishno Devi.

An American priest, Father Vincent Sinclair has disturbing visions of people familiar to him, except that they seem to exist in other ages. Induced into past-life regressions, he moves to India to piece together the violent images. Shadowing his every move is the Crux Decussata Permuta, a clandestine secret society which would rather wipe out creation than allow an ancient secret from being disclosed.

== Author/Editions ==
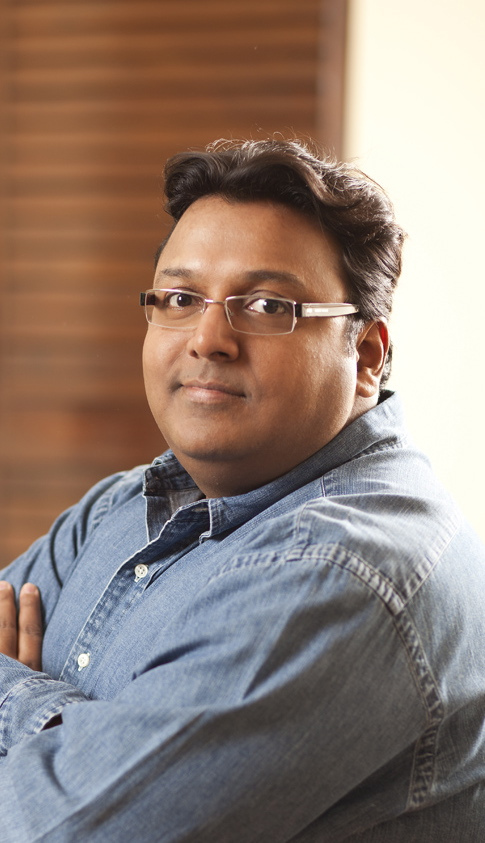
Ashwin Sanghi

The Rozabal Line is a thriller spanning continents and centuries, with Ashwin Sanghi, under the pseudonym Shawn Haigins, telling a story that goes back to the time of the birth of Abrahamic religions. It was originally published in 2007, and a revised edition was published by Westland Ltd. & Tranquebar Press in 2008 under the author's own name, after some commentators such as Humra Quraishi said that the book should have been published under Sanghi's real name.

According to Tehelka, one of India's news magazines, The Rozabal Line is "a thriller that inquiries into the controversial claim that Jesus Christ travelled to India and was buried in Kashmir's Rozabal Tomb".

The Hindu, one of India's National dailies, says that "The book deals in greater depth with the issue of Christ’s union with Mary Magdalene touched upon by The Da Vinci Code by Dan Brown as well as incorporating postulates of several other books, including Jesus Lived in India: Life Before and After the Crucifixion by Holger Kersten and Jesus Died In Kashmir: Jesus, Moses and The Ten Lost Tribes Of Israel by Andreas Kaiser". After the novel was published, due to attention drawn to the site by others as well as the story told in the book, there was a large upsurge of visitors to the Rozabal shrine in Srinagar.

Pradeep Sebastian of The Hindu wrote, "And so The Lost Symbol comes two years too late. Conspiracy thrillers swamped the market, reaching even Indian shores with The Rozabal Line, and offered us so much meat, that we couldn't relish chewing anymore."

At a talk delivered in Chennai, the author said, "We assume the different faiths are distinctly different, but once you start tracing back the roots of their beliefs, you find their origins are much closer that you might imagine." Irrespective of the controversial theme surrounding his book, the author has continuously maintained that his book is a work of fiction and should be read as a fiction conspiracy thriller. In an interview to a leading tabloid, the author was asked: "Do you believe that Jesus lived in India?" To this he replied, "I don't think it's in any way relevant if he came here or not. But do I wish it was true? Yes, completely. Isn't that such a romantic notion?" MV Kamath, leading commentator, has said that the book is "provocative, but certainly commanding attention."

The book went repeated printing runs. and it currently being converted into a screenplay.

The ongoing controversial nature of the story surrounding the tomb, as promoted by various people such as those of the Ahmadiyya movement and as also explored in this book, resulted in the site being closed down to visitors, particularly after Lonely Planet detailed the tomb.

== Similarities to the 2008 Mumbai attacks ==
The Hindustan Times was the first to point out that Sanghi's novel bore several similarities to the 2008 Mumbai attacks. In particular, Sanghi's novel spoke of an attack by the Lashkar-e-Taiba, an Islamist terror group based in Pakistan controlled Kashmir. It also spoke of the Lashkar spinning off an ultra-elite group of twelve commandos, similar to the Deccan Mujahideen. The plot of The Rozabal Line used a ship off the coast of Gujarat as well as a Thuraya satellite phone besides describing the Taj Mahal Palace & Tower as the residence of one of the main characters in the story. Sanghi also described the group as being controlled by the Inter-Services Intelligence of Pakistan without the knowledge of the Pakistani president. All these elements were purportedly present in the November 2008 Mumbai Terror Attacks. Consequently, The Hindu included The Rozabal Line among its top fiction picks while The Telegraph included The Rozabal Line among its top "Paperback Pickings".

The author has clarified in a subsequent interview that he was unhappy about the commonalities although he readily agrees to being called a "conspiracy theorist".

== See also ==
- Theory of Kashmiri descent from lost tribes of Israel
