= National Register of Historic Places listings in Pierce County, Wisconsin =

Location of Pierce County in Wisconsin

This is a list of the National Register of Historic Places listings in Pierce County, Wisconsin. It is intended to provide a comprehensive listing of entries in the National Register of Historic Places that are located in Pierce County, Wisconsin. The locations of National Register properties for which the latitude and longitude coordinates are included below may be seen in a map.

There are 11 properties and districts listed on the National Register in the county.

This National Park Service list is complete through NPS recent listings posted October 16, 2026.

== Current listings ==
	Name on the Register	Image	Date listed	Location	City or town	Description
1	Diamond Bluff Site-Mero Mound Group	Diamond Bluff Site-Mero Mound Group	August 1, 1975 (#75000075)	Address Restricted	Diamond Bluff	At least two villages, surrounded by hundreds of burial mounds and a bird and several animal effigy mounds. Some think this might be a place where Late Woodland culture transitioned to Oneota.
2	Roscius and Ingebor Freeman House	Roscius and Ingebor Freeman House	March 13, 2025 (#100011509)	220 South Fourth Street; 44°51′21″N 92°37′21″W	River Falls	Large Craftsman-style house designed by Arthur Symes and built in 1912 for pharmacist Roscius and his second wife Ingebor "Belle". This Roscius was the son and partner of Roscius S. below, and the style of his house was considered more modern than his father's at the time. Has full-width porch, art-glass windows, and matching garage - all with no substantial alterations since 1912.
3	Roscius S. and Lydia R. Freeman House	Roscius S. and Lydia R. Freeman House	May 30, 2007 (#07000501)	220 N. Third St. 44°51′41″N 92°37′19″W	River Falls	Freeman was a local druggist who built the house in 1908, mixing elements of the Queen Anne, Shingle and Colonial Revival architecture styles.
4	Glen Park Municipal Swimming Pool	Glen Park Municipal Swimming Pool	June 5, 2007 (#07000542)	355 Park St. 44°51′18″N 92°38′00″W	River Falls	Public pool complex constructed by the CWA, PWA and WPA from 1933 to 1937, during the Great Depression. Still in use.
5	Glen Park Suspension Footbridge	Glen Park Suspension Footbridge	July 13, 2018 (#100002671)	End of W Cascade Ave., across the South Fork Kinnickinnic R. 44°51′14″N 92°38′00″W	River Falls	190-foot cable suspension bridge across the South Fork Kinnickinnic River, designed by Minneapolis Bridge Company and built in 1925.
6	Jay and Bernice Grimm House	Jay and Bernice Grimm House	January 29, 2025 (#100011401)	108 South Sixth Street; 44°51′24″N 92°37′09″W	River Falls	Craftsman-style airplane bungalow built in 1915, with typical exposed rafter ends and tapered wood columns. It also has decorative half-timbering, art-glass windows, and a sleeping porch in the upper floor. Jay was an attorney and judge, and a state normal school regent.
7	H. S. Miller Bank	H. S. Miller Bank	August 19, 1994 (#94000998)	223 Broad St. 44°44′59″N 92°48′08″W	Prescott	1885 bank building with Italianate and Romanesque elements. Now houses visitor center.
8	North Hall-River Falls State Normal School	North Hall-River Falls State Normal School	April 3, 1986 (#86000627)	University of Wisconsin; 44°51′17″N 92°37′21″W	River Falls	North Hall of the University of Wisconsin-River Falls, built in 1914 as the Agriculture Building. (Housed the Campus School, the last of its kind in the state)
9	Pierce County Courthouse	Pierce County Courthouse	March 9, 1982 (#82000696)	411 W. Main St. 44°43′57″N 92°29′05″W	Ellsworth	1905 building with Neoclassical and Beaux-Arts elements.
10	Daniel Smith House	Daniel Smith House	March 15, 1984 (#84003775)	331 N. Lake St. 44°45′02″N 92°48′11″W	Prescott	1853 Greek Revival home built in 1855 Daniel, who was a shopkeeper, hotelier, coroner, sheriff, and civic leader. His wife Salome also taught school in the house.
11	South Hall, River Falls State Normal School	South Hall, River Falls State Normal School	November 7, 1976 (#76000073)	320 E. Cascade Ave. 44°51′13″N 92°37′23″W	River Falls	Site of the sole building when the fourth Wisconsin Normal School started at River Falls in 1874. It burned in 1897 and was rebuilt in 1898. Now South Hall at the University of Wisconsin-River Falls.

== See also ==
- List of National Historic Landmarks in Wisconsin
- National Register of Historic Places listings in Wisconsin
- Listings in neighboring counties: Dakota (MN), Dunn, Goodhue (MN), Pepin, St. Croix, Washington (MN)
