= List of University of Wisconsin–River Falls alumni =

This list of University of Wisconsin–River Falls alumni includes notable graduates, non-graduate former students, and current students of University of Wisconsin–River Falls (UWRF), a public university located in River Falls, Wisconsin, United States.

== Academia ==
- John Q. Emery, early university president
- Edward N. Peterson, historian

== Business ==
- David Swensen, chief investment officer, Yale University; member of President Barack Obama's Economic Recovery Advisory Board

== Entertainment ==
- Michael J. Nelson, comedian (did not graduate)

== Literature ==
- Boyd Huppert, journalist (Kare 11)
- Michael Norman, author
- Cathy Wurzer, journalist
- David Carr, journalist and author

== Politics ==
- William Berndt, Wisconsin State Senate
- William Walter Clark, former member of the Wisconsin State Assembly and Wisconsin State Senate
- Paul Dailey, Jr., former member of the Wisconsin State Assembly
- Kristen Dexter, former member of the Wisconsin State Assembly
- Steve Drazkowski, Minnesota politician
- Robert M. Dueholm, Wisconsin State Assembly
- Donald L. Iverson, former member of the Wisconsin State Assembly
- Robert P. Knowles, Wisconsin State Senate
- Mark W. Neumann, former congressman
- Harvey Stower, Wisconsin State Assembly
- Tom Tiffany, former member of the Wisconsin State Assembly, current congressman
- Kenneth S. White, Wisconsin State Senate

== Religion ==
- Francis Paul Prucha, Roman Catholic priest and educator

== Sports ==
- Osborne Cowles, basketball coach
- Nate DeLong, former NBA player
- Rocky Larson, football coach
- Owen Schmitt, former NFL player
- Mike Young, minor league player and manager, Australia national baseball team player and coach and Australia national cricket team fielding coach

=== Other ===
- Daniel Brandenstein, astronaut
- Jim Hall, programmer
