= Zhang Lei =

Zhang Lei may refer to:

- Zhang Lei (actor) (born 1972), Chinese actor
- Zhang Lei (actor, born 1980), Chinese actor
- Zhang Lei (singer) (born 1981), Chinese singer
- Zhang Lei (investor) (born 1972), Chinese investor
- Zhang Lei (host) (born 1979), Chinese television presenter
- Zhang Lei (politician) (born 1961, Chinese: 张雷), Chinese politician.

== Sportspeople ==
- Zhang Lei (fencer) (born 1979), Chinese foil fencer
- Zhang Lei (cyclist) (born 1981), Chinese cyclist
- Zhang Lei (volleyball) (born 1985), Chinese volleyball player
- Zhang Lei (water polo) (born 1988), Chinese water polo player
- Zhang Lei (table tennis), Chinese table tennis player
- Zhang Lei (footballer) (born 1985), Chinese football player
- Zhang Lei (referee) (born 1982), Chinese football referee
