= South Hall =

South Hall may refer to:

- South Hall, a building at the University of California, Santa Barbara
- South Hall (UC Berkeley), the oldest building at the University of California, Berkeley
- South Hall, River Falls State Normal School, the oldest building of the University of Wisconsin-River Falls
- South Hall, a residence hall at The George Washington University
- South Hall, a dorm at Tufts University
- South Hall, a building at the Tennessee Technological University
- South Hall (1898), a former building at the University of Arizona in Tucson, Arizona designed by Henry C. Trost (demolished 1958)

== See also ==
- Southall, London
