= Hillhouse Investment =

Chinese multinational private equity firm

Hillhouse Investment Management Ltd.
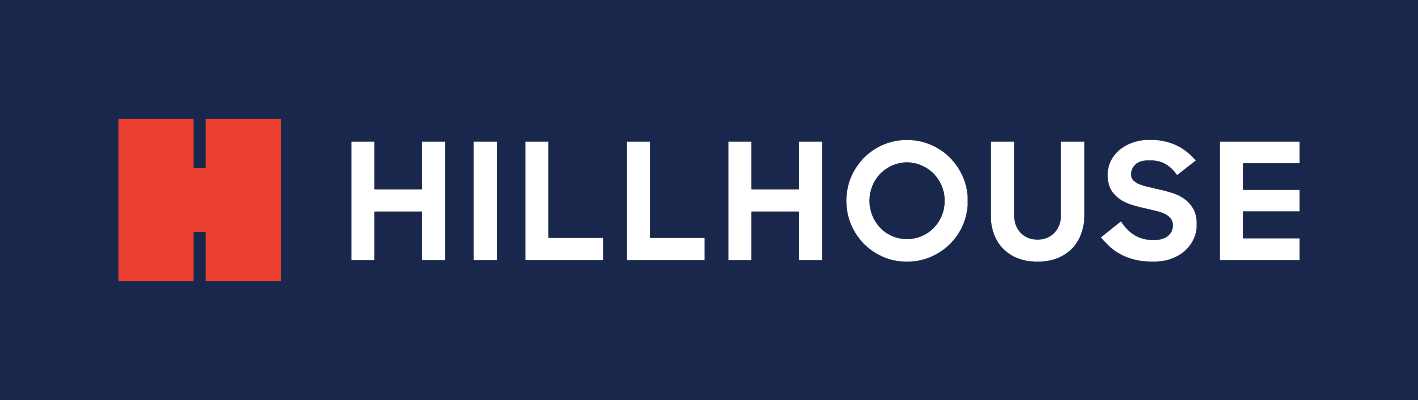
- Type: Private
- Industry: Private equity
- Founded: 2005; 21 years ago
- Founder: Lei Zhang
- Area served: East Asia; Southeast Asia; North America; Europe
- AUM: US$100.0 billion (December 2025)
- Website: www.hillhouseinvestment.com

Hillhouse Investment Management Ltd. is a Singapore‑headquartered investment firm founded by Lei Zhang in 2005. The firm began operations with global investments in public equities after receiving seed capital from the Yale University endowment, with early stakes in companies such as Tencent, JD.com Inc, and Baidu. Currently, Hillhouse Investment funds businesses of various scale and lifecycle stages.

Hillhouse maintains offices in Singapore, Hong Kong, Beijing, Shanghai, New York City, London and Abu Dhabi.

Hillhouse's assets under management (AUM) are estimated at US$100 billion as of April 2026. In October 2021, Hillhouse raised US$18 billion for its fifth flagship private equity fund, breaking the previous record set by KKR's US$15 billion pan-Asia private equity fund raised that same year.

Hillhouse invests in sectors including consumer, healthcare, technology, and financials services.

== History ==
Lei Zhang founded Hillhouse Investment in China in June 2005 with an initial US$20 million of seed capital from the Yale University endowment through David Swensen, Yale's Chief Investment Officer at the time.

By 2017, the firm had participated in more private equity acquisitions in the Asia-Pacific region than any other private equity firm, totaling US$26 billion worth of transactions.

In 2020, Hillhouse spun off its venture capital unit into an independent fund, GL Ventures. Hillhouse was nearing raising US$18 billion to back three new funds in May 2021, higher than the projected US$13 billion in April 2021, according to reports, with US$10 billion to be allocated to buyouts, and the rest "split between growth equity and venture." In August 2021, Hillhouse completed fundraising for its fifth flagship private equity investment fund at US$18 billion, the largest amount of capital raised by any private equity firm in Asia and breaking the previous record set by KKR's US$15 billion pan-Asia private equity fund, also raised in 2021.

In 2022, Hillhouse started its first real estate-focused fund, the Hillhouse Real Asset Opportunities Fund (RAOF), with a total investment of more than US$2 billion.

In 2024, The Wall Street Journal reported that Hillhouse's China staff had been reduced, while the team in Japan was increased, along with added hires in London and Singapore.

== Notable investments ==
Tencent Holdings Ltd: Some of the original US$20 million provided from Yale was invested in Tencent Holdings in 2005. It was Hillhouse's earliest investment and one of their most profitable.

JD.com: Hillhouse was an early investor in JD.com. At the time of the listing of JD.com on NASDAQ in May 2014, the company was valued at US$26 billion. Hillhouse's original US$255 million investment was, at the time of the IPO, valued at US$3.9 billion.

Blue Moon: Hillhouse invested in Blue Moon, a liquid detergent maker, in 2010 as its only outside institutional investor.

Zoom: Hillhouse was an investor in Zoom Video Communications in an early funding round in February 2015.

BeiGene: Hillhouse co-led a round of financing for biotechnology company BeiGene in May 2015.

Belle International: In July 2017, Hillhouse purchased footwear company Belle International for US$6.8 billion.

Global Logistic Properties: Hillhouse, together with Hopu Investment Management, purchased Singapore-based warehouse operator Global Logistic Properties in 2017 for US$12 billion. At the time, it was the largest buyout of an Asian company.

Little Freddie: In 2018, Hillhouse began investing in the food sector, including organic baby food and snack manufacturer Little Freddie, a Californian craft beer maker, and a pet food brand.

Miniso: In October 2018, Hillhouse signed a strategic investment agreement with Japanese-style retailer Miniso worth US$145.6 million.

Philips Domestic Appliances: In August 2021, Hillhouse closed the acquisition of the global domestic appliances business from Dutch conglomerate Philips.

LifeStyles Healthcare: In December 2020, Hillhouse invested in Lifestyles Healthcare, an Australian global manufacturer of sexual wellness products.

== Joint ventures ==
Hillhouse established an exclusive joint venture focused on China with the US healthcare provider, Mayo Clinic. Hillhouse works with the Mayo organization to expand its healthcare outreach in China.

In November 2017, Peet's Coffee China, a partnership between Hillhouse and San Francisco-based Peet's Coffee, opened the first Peet's Coffee roastery in Shanghai.

== Investors ==
According to the Wall Street Journal, Stanford University pledged to invest about US$200 million with Hillhouse in August 2015. With Stanford's investment, the firm managed "money for at least six of the 10 wealthiest universities in the U.S." in 2015. The other investors at the time included Princeton University, Massachusetts Institute of Technology, University of Pennsylvania, University of Texas, and Yale University.

CPPIB committed US$200 million to Fund II in 2014, US$300 million to Fund III in 2016, and US$300 million to Fund IV in 2018.
