= Edward Peterson =

Edward Peterson may refer to:

- Edward N. Peterson, American historian and professor
- Ed Peterson, American basketball player.
