= KFA =

KFA can refer to:

== Association football ==
- Kelantan FA, Malaysia
- Kerala Football Association, India
- Korea Football Association, South Korea
- Kuwait Football Association, Kuwait
- Kwara Football Academy, Nigeria

== Education ==
- King Fahad Academy, an Islamic school in London, England
- Kleinpell Fine Arts, at the University of Wisconsin–River Falls, US

== Other uses ==
- Kentucky Fairness Alliance, an American LGBT advocacy group
- Korean Friendship Association, a Spain-based international non-profit
- Kiffa Airport, Mauritania (IATA:KFA)
- Kodava language of Karnataka, India (ISO 639:kfa)
