= UWRF Teaching Program =

Flagship teaching program in The University of Wisconsin–River Falls

The University of Wisconsin–River Falls Teaching Program is the flagship program for the College of Education and Professional Studies at UWRF.

The University of Wisconsin–River Falls was founded in 1874. The University of Wisconsin–River Falls' main purpose when first created was to prepare people to have careers in teaching. Over time the demand for more studies increased and UWRF incorporated liberal and fine arts. The University of Wisconsin–River Falls became a part of the University of Wisconsin System in 1971. In 1897 the Normal school was destroyed by a fire and only a half of day of classes was missed due to the community opening up churches, rooms, and other places to meet so classes could continue.

== Wisconsin State Standards for Teaching ==
There are ten standards for a licensure to become a teacher in the state of Wisconsin. Teachers must know the subject of subjects they are teaching. This not only means a teacher knows detail of the concepts being taught, but also can apply them to situations appealing to students, helping them to learn better. Teachers also must know how a child grows. Some children take longer to grow and learn things. Teachers should understand that students learn differently. This means that teachers should realize that there are many types of learning styles and cater to all of the learning styles students show in their classroom. Teachers must know how to teach the subject they are teaching. Teachers need to know how to manage a classroom. Teachers need to communicate with others and be able to change their lesson plans to cater to the students they have each year. Teachers know how to test their students and also can assess themselves. Lastly, teachers should be connected with other teachers in their community.

== Location ==
The university is located thirty minutes from the Twin Cities of Minneapolis and St. Paul. Students that attend this university get multiple experience of diversity through the different rural, suburban, and urban schools near the area. This university also makes it available that upon completion of a bachelor's degree a graduate will receive their Wisconsin teacher's license. At UWRF, there is a smaller teacher to student ratio so students have a more personal experience with their professors.

== Programs ==
The teaching program at the University of Wisconsin–River Falls offers a variety of majors and minors. These include many departments on campus from dance to art education to areas such as chemistry or economics. The teaching program offers degrees in early childhood, elementary, and secondary education. These three degrees prepare students to become excellent practitioners in their field. The University of Wisconsin–River Falls is the only public university in the country that has a Montessori graduate program for elementary education. River Falls also is one of two in the nation to offer a graduate-level Montessori program in early childhood education.

== Common Core ==
The Common Core program is thoroughly taught and explained in the teaching program at the University of Wisconsin River Falls. It was implemented due to the rising popularity of the Common Core curriculum in an attempt to better prepare teachers.
