= Zhang Lei (investor) =

Chinese investor and entrepreneur

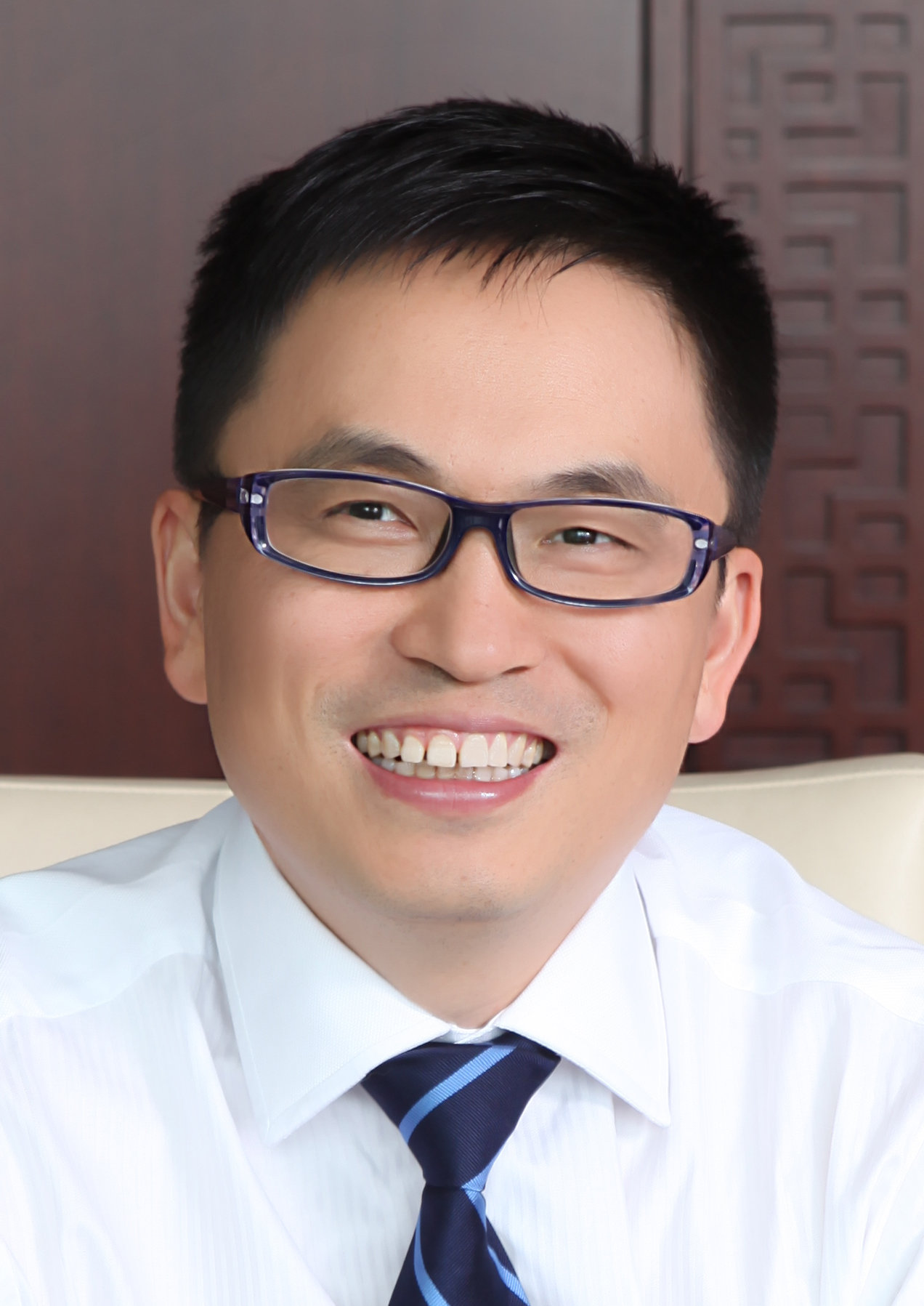
- Lei in 2012
- Born: 1972 (age 53–54)
- Education: Yale School of Management; Yale University; Renmin University
- Occupation: Businessman
- Title: Founder and chairman, Hillhouse Investment

Zhang Lei (born 1972) is a Chinese investor and philanthropist. He is the founder and chairman of Hillhouse Investment.

== Early life and education ==
Zhang was born in 1972 in Zhumadian, a city in Henan province, central China. He received a scholarship to Renmin University of China, where he received a bachelor's degree in economics in 1994.

In 1999, while studying at the Yale University, Zhang took a class taught by David F. Swensen, who was the chief investment officer of the Yale Endowment. Swensen became a mentor to Zhang, leading to Zhang's internship at the Yale Endowment, his first position in finance. Zhang translated Swensen's book, Pioneering Portfolio Management, An Unconventional Approach to Institutional Investment (2000), into Chinese while studying at Yale, which, according to the Financial Times, involved creating new Mandarin words for "endowment" and "fiduciary".

In 2002, he received an MBA and MA in international relations from Yale University. After graduating, Zhang took a role with Virginia equities firm EMM, covering Southeast Asia. He obtained certification as a chartered financial analyst (CFA) in 2013.

== Career ==
Zhang founded Hillhouse Investment in 2005, with $20 million of seed capital from Yale University's endowment fund. Hillhouse invests globally, with a particular focus on Asia, and manages about US $50 billion of assets as of September 2018. Major investors include Yale, Stanford and Canada Pension Plan Investment Board (CPPIB).

Zhang is a founding board member of the United World College (UWC) of Southeast Asia Foundation. Zhang is vice chairman and a trustee of the board at Renmin University of China. He is a trustee of the Yale-NUS College and the chair of the Yale Asia Development Council and a member of the Hong Kong Financial Services Development Council. In June 2016, Yale Corporation appointed Zhang as a trustee. In 2020, he was named to the board of directors of FCLTGlobal and serves on the advisory board for the Bloomberg New Economy Forum.

In 2014, Zhang donated US$8.88 million to the Yale School of Management, which at the time was the largest donation made to the business school. In 2017, he donated US$43M to Renmin University and co-found the Gaoli Academy (高礼研究院). He has also been involved with the BN Vocational School (BNVS) in China.

As of May 2026, Forbes estimates his net worth at $3 billion.

== Personal life ==
Zhang resides in Hong Kong. He also holds Singaporean citizenship. He is married and has two children.
