= Taaleri =

Finnish financial services company

Taaleri Plc
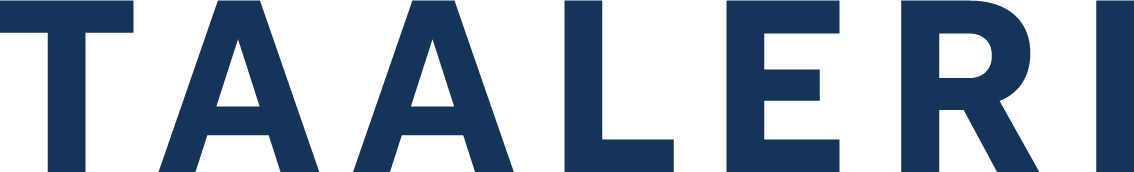
- Company type: Julkinen osakeyhtiö
- Traded as: Nasdaq Helsinki: TAALA
- Industry: Financial and investment services
- Founded: 2007; 19 years ago
- Headquarters: Helsinki, Finland
- Key people: Juhani Elomaa (Chairman), Peter Ramsay (CEO)
- Revenue: ▼63.2 million euros (2022)
- Number of employees: ▲106 (2022)
- Website: www.taaleri.com/en

Taaleri Plc (natively Taaleri Oyj, previously Taaleritehdas Plc/Oyj) is a Finnish investment and asset management group concentrated on renewable energy and other alternative investments. The company is listed on Nasdaq Helsinki.

== History ==
=== Taaleritehdas (2007–2015) ===
Taaleritehdas started its operations in 2007.

In 2010, Taaleritehdas provided wealth management services, and managed various funds including a Turkish investment fund and Russian investment fund. Other funds included a Finnish value stock fund; a fund, based on the Yale University investment model of asset allocation (developed by David F. Swensen); and a fund concentrating on emerging European markets in Eastern Europe.

=== Taaleri (2016–present) ===
In the end of 2021, Taaleri had 2.2 billion euros of assets under management in its private equity funds and co-investments.
