= Humanities Quadrangle =

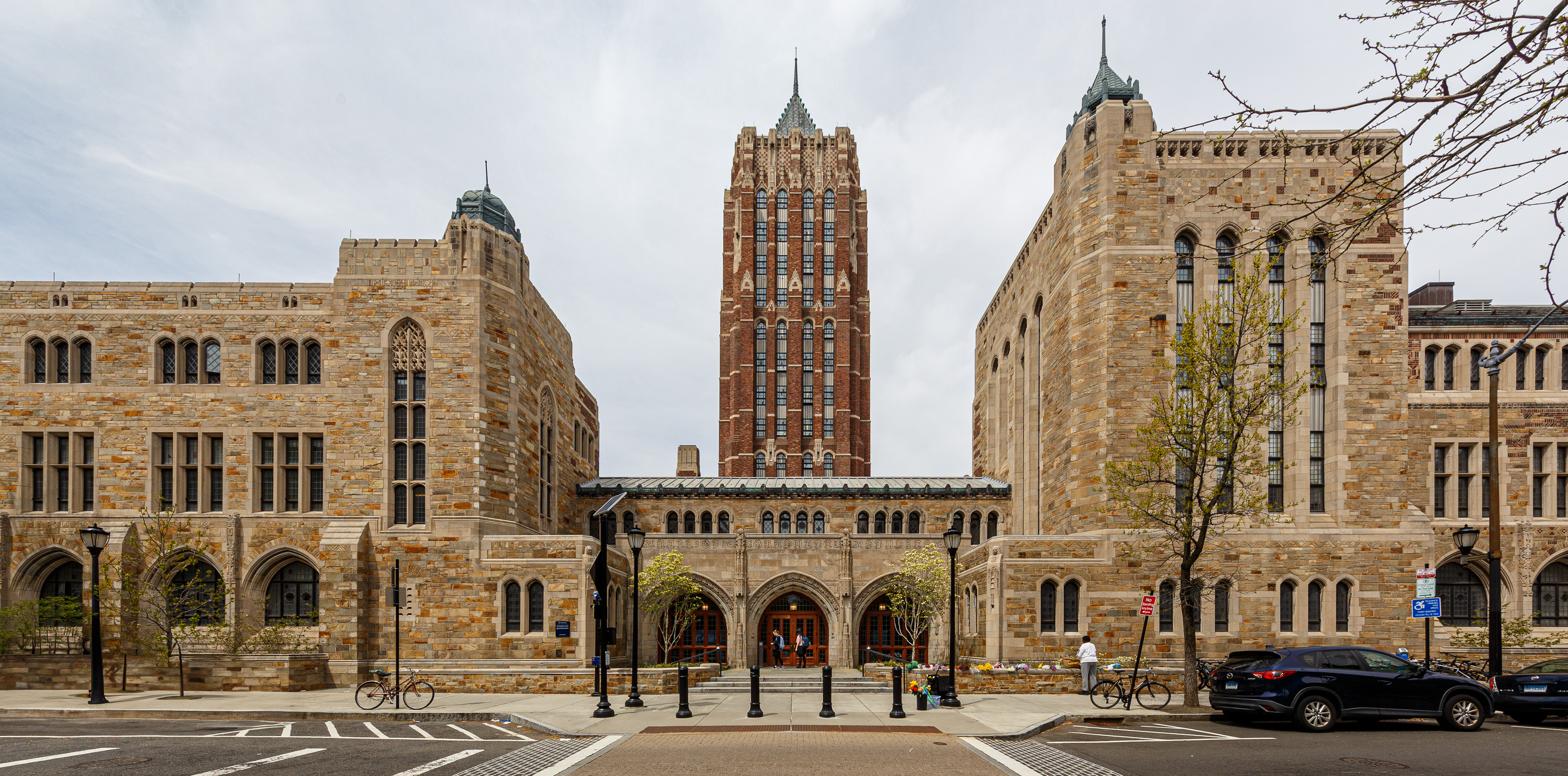
- York Street façade
- Former names: Hall of Graduate Studies

General information
- Architectural style: Collegiate Gothic
- Location: 320 York Street, New Haven, Connecticut, United States
- Opened: 1932
- Renovated: 2018 - 2021
- Owner: Yale University

Technical details
- Floor count: 14
- Floor area: 173,811 sq ft (16,147.6 m^{2})

Design and construction
- Architect: James Gamble Rogers

The Humanities Quadrangle (HQ), originally the Hall of Graduate Studies (HGS), is an academic quadrangle at Yale University in New Haven, Connecticut. First opened in 1932, the building was designed as a Collegiate Gothic structure by architect James Gamble Rogers. After serving for 86 years as the home of faculty offices and graduate student housing for the Yale Graduate School of Arts and Sciences, the Hall of Graduate Studies underwent a series of major renovations designed by Annum Architects (formerly Ann Beha Architects) starting in 2018.

It reopened as the Humanities Quadrangle in 2021, now serving as the home of 15 academic departments and several humanities programs. With 311 offices, 28 classrooms, and 24 meeting spaces, the Humanities Quadrangle is frequently used by students and faculty. Among others, HQ houses Yale College's Directed Studies program and the Whitney Humanities Center.

== History ==
=== Before academic use ===
Located at 320 York Street in New Haven, Connecticut, the site of the Humanities Quadrangle has undergone significant changes throughout its past. A map from 1824 shows the area as largely undeveloped, aside from a few small buildings along the curb of York Street. By 1852, part of the land belonged to the local Christ Church, and ownership was transferred to the New Haven Wheel Company by 1886. The company vacated its premises by 1901, and buildings adjacent to the former wheel factory became fraternity housing by 1924.

=== Original construction ===
In a February 1929 speech to recent graduates, Yale University President James Angell announced plans for building a new quadrangle to house the Yale Graduate School, and construction began the next year. Some had expected this development to cause the demolition of Mory's, but blueprints were drawn to exclude the historic restaurant. Although $3.5 million was initially budgeted, the final cost was only $2.5 million, which was financed by funds from the estate of John Sterling. The building was officially named after its benefactor, but the Sterling surname was dropped over time, leading to the Hall of Graduate Studies.

The Hall of Graduate Studies opened its doors for the first time on September 29, 1932, coinciding with the start of the academic year. The new quadrangle included 80 offices, 16 classrooms, a 200-foot tower, and dormitories for 225 students.

=== Modern renovations ===
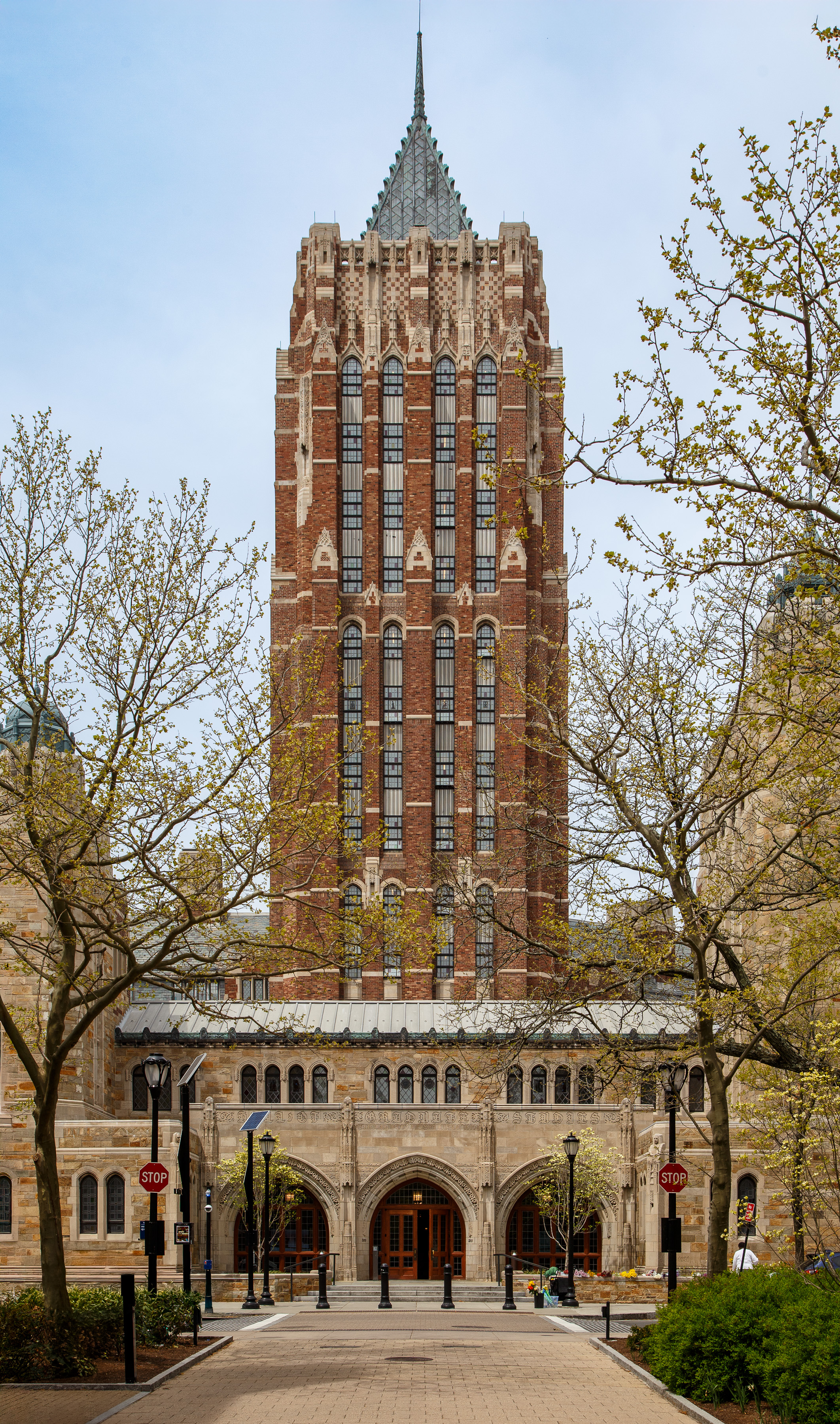
Swensen Tower

In March 2015, Yale received a $25 million donation towards transforming the Hall of Graduate Studies into a center for the humanities, which prompted the building's iconic 14-story tower to be named after David Swensen. In addition, another $50 million was provided by an anonymous donor in January 2016, contributing to a total budget of $162 million. By September 2017, the city's Board of Alders approved the new site plans, and construction began in August 2018.

The renovations were originally slated to be done by 2020, but delays due to the COVID-19 pandemic caused the project to finish a year behind schedule. The building officially reopened on February 15, 2021 as the Humanities Quadrangle, although some facilities were not completed until May 2021. About 13,000 square feet of underground space was added during renovations, resulting in a total floor area of 173,811 square feet.

== Architecture ==
=== Finnegan's contributions ===
During construction of the Hall of Graduate Studies, a man known only as Mr. Finnegan was placed in charge of building operations. Finnegan was tasked with executing James Gamble Rogers's plans, but he made modifications to express a personal disdain for the self-importance of graduate schools.

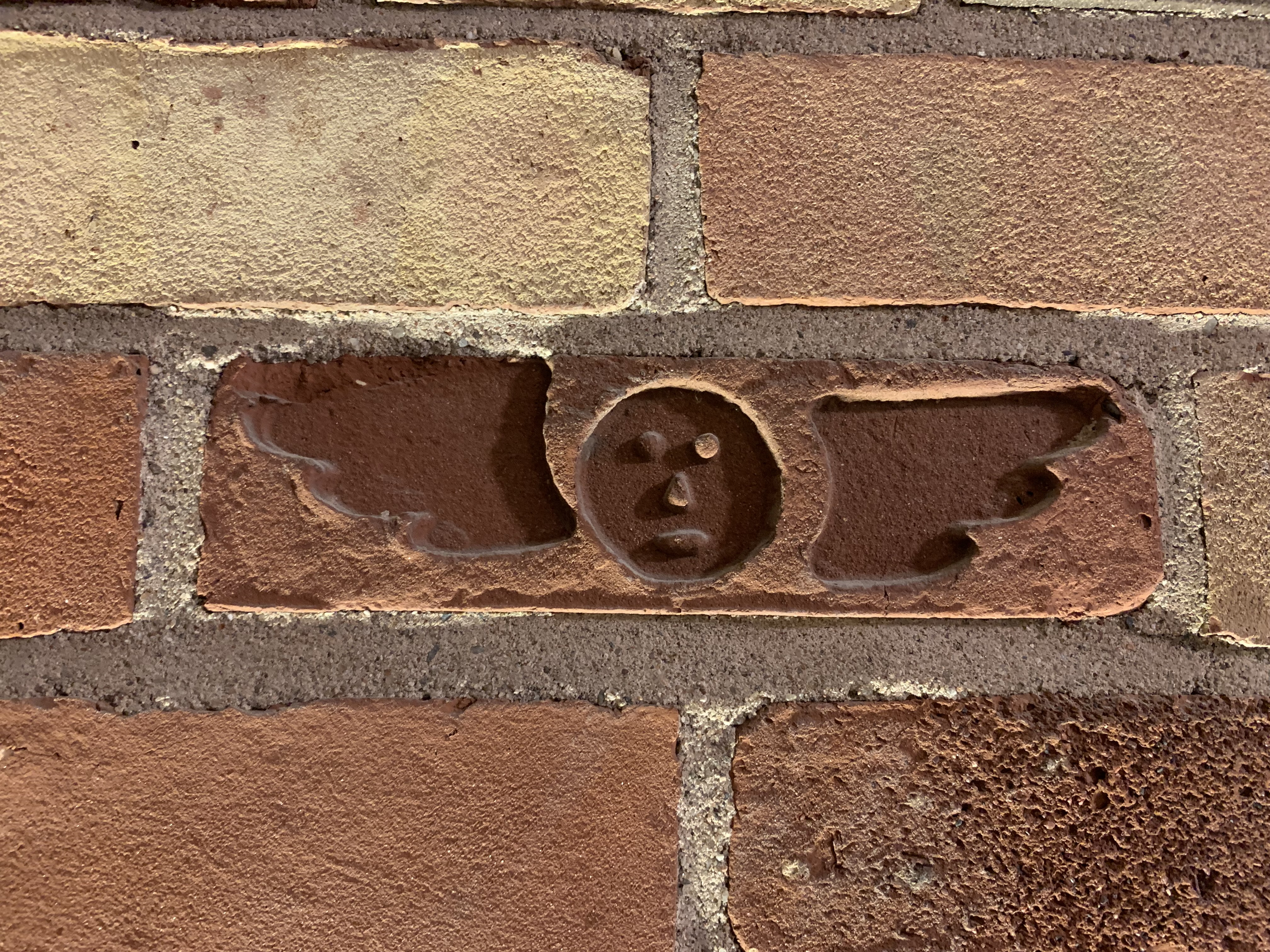
One of Finnegan's special bricks in the Yale Humanities Quadrangle, with an angel carving.

The first of the unauthorized changes was the use of bricks with unique carvings. Although Yale had requested bricks with its name emblazoned on the surface, Finnegan created additional designs to represent senior university officials. These included an angel (James Angell), a Maltese cross (Wilbur Cross), and a furnace (Edgar Furniss). Many of the special bricks can still be seen in the building's lobby.

Finnegan also directed the installation of lifelike busts of Rogers and Thomas Farnam, the university's comptroller. The busts were displayed prominently within the building's portico, and they were discovered by Farnam himself during an inspection visit. Farnam demanded for the sculptures to be removed, but workers were only able to whittle them down into the resemblance of Egyptian pharaohs.

After the Hall of Graduate Studies opened, a previously unnoticed inscription was found on the archway of the building's entrance. The text was from the novel Scaramouche by Rafael Sabatini, stating that "He was born with a gift for laughter and a sense that the world was mad." University officials were upset by the inscription's non-scholarly origin, and after a brief investigation, it was revealed that Finnegan was responsible for the unsanctioned chiseling. However, Rogers would go on to claim that the text was proposed by a committee of Yale faculty.

=== Entryway stone heads ===
The archway above the entrance of the building also features 12 stone heads, which face incoming foot traffic from the street. They represent a selection of the 85 draftsmen who worked on the construction of the Hall of Graduate Studies, but only 11 surnames have been associated with the carvings. Unlike the adjacent textual inscription by Finnegan, the stone heads were approved in advance by the site's architects.

== Other ==
In May 2018, the building was the site of an incident where a Black Yale graduate student was reported to the police for napping in her dorm's common room. The early morning encounter was streamed on Facebook Live and sparked controversy over racial profiling.
