= Mero Mound Group (Diamond Bluff Site) =

- Diamond Bluff Site-Mero Mound Group
- U.S. National Register of Historic Places
- Location within Wisconsin Location within the United States
- Location: Address restricted
- Nearest city: Diamond Bluff, Wisconsin
- Coordinates: 44°38′N 92°36′W
- NRHP reference No.: 75000075 and 92000590
- Added to NRHP: August 01, 1975 (original); June 04, 1992 (increase)

Mero Mound Group or Diamond Bluff Site is an archeological site near Diamond Bluff, Wisconsin, in Pierce County, Wisconsin. It consists of at least two village sites surrounded by hundreds of mounds, including three effigy mounds. All were constructed from around 1000 AD to 1300 AD.

It is also known as 47-Pi-2. As Mero Archeological District, its boundaries were increased in 1992.

== See also ==
- National Register of Historic Places listings in Pierce County, Wisconsin
