= Rocky Larson =

American football coach

Current position
- Title: Athletic director & head coach
- Team: Mayville State
- Conference: Frontier
- Record: 27–47

Biographical details
- Education: University of Wisconsin–River Falls (BA); Concordia University Irvine (MA)

Coaching career (HC unless noted)
- 2010–2014: Wisconsin–River Falls (SA)
- 2015: Minnesota (intern)
- 2015: Wisconsin–La Crosse (DB)
- 2016–2019: Wisconsin–River Falls (DC)
- 2020–present: Mayville State

Administrative career (AD unless noted)
- 2023–2024: Mayville State (interim)
- 2024–present: Mayville State

Head coaching record
- Overall: 27–47

Rocky Larson is an American college football coach and athletic director. He is the head football coach and athletic director for Mayville State University, holding the position of head football coach since 2020 and athletic director since 2023.

== Coaching career ==
=== Early coaching career ===
Larson attended college at the University of Wisconsin–River Falls in River Falls, Wisconsin from 2010–2014. While there he served as a student assistant on the Wisconsin–River Falls Falcons football team for five seasons. He then spent one spring as an intern for the Minnesota Golden Gophers football team, then he spent that following season as the defensive backs coach at the University of Wisconsin–La Crosse in La Crosse, Wisconsin.

=== Wisconsin–River Falls ===
In March 2016, Larson was hired as the defensive coordinator at his alma mater, the University of Wisconsin–River Falls. He spent four seasons with the Falcons, in which he coached 12 All-WIAC players, 1 NCAA Division III All-American, and had one player, Nick Jacobsen, who was picked up by the Minnesota Vikings for their rookie camp.

=== Mayville State ===
In 2020, Larson was named as the head coach at Mayville State University in Mayville, North Dakota. Since being hired, he has accumulated an overall record of 21–44. The Comets currently are members of the Frontier Conference.

Larson was named as the interim athletic director at Mayville State in 2023 and full-time athletic director in 2024.

== Personal life ==
In 2017, Larson graduated from Concordia University Irvine with a master of arts degree in coach and athletic administration. He has three children and a wife named Richell.

== Head coaching record ==
Year	Team	Overall	Conference	Standing	Bowl/playoffs	NAIA Coaches'^{#}
Mayville State Comets (North Star Athletic Association) (2020–2024)
2020	Mayville State	2–7	1–6	5th		
2021	Mayville State	2–9	2–6	5th		
2022	Mayville State	3–8	0–6	7th		
2023	Mayville State	4–7	3–5	T–3rd		
2024	Mayville State	4–6	3–5	T–3rd		
Mayville State Comets (Frontier Conference) (2025–present)
2025	Mayville State	5–6	2–4	5th (East)		
2026	Mayville State	7–4	3–3	T–4th (East)		
Mayville State:		27–47	14–35			
Total:		27–47				
