= Concordia University Irvine =

Lutheran university in Irvine, California, US

Coordinates: 33°39′13″N 117°48′41″W

- Former name: Christ College Irvine (1976–1993)
- Motto: Developing Wise, Honorable, and Cultivated Citizens.
- Type: Private
- Established: 1976
- Religious affiliation: Lutheran Church–Missouri Synod
- Endowment: $46 million
- President: Michael Thomas
- Provost: Scott Ashmon
- Students: 3,481
- Undergraduates: 1,592
- Postgraduates: 2,454
- Location: Irvine, California, United States
- Campus: Suburban
- Colors: Green and gold
- Sporting affiliations: NCAA Division II – PacWest
- Mascot: Golden Eagles
- Website: cui.edu

Concordia University Irvine is a private Lutheran university in Irvine, California, United States. It was established in 1976 to provide a Lutheran Church–Missouri Synod college to serve the Pacific Southwest and provide training for pastors, religious education teachers, and Christian school administrators. Concordia University Irvine has a total undergraduate enrollment of 1,592 and its campus size is 70 acres (28 ha). It is part of the Concordia University System.

== History ==
In 1955, Dr. Victor Behnken, then president of the Pacific Southwest District of the Lutheran Church–Missouri Synod (LCMS), proposed the creation of a preparatory college for the Pacific Southwest. In 1962, the LCMS agreed to build the school. A search committee commissioned by the district considered 87 sites before commercial and residential real estate developer The Irvine Company offered the present location in Irvine. In 1973, Rev. Dr. Charles Manske accepted the call from the district to be the founding president of the school, which was originally named Christ College Irvine.

In February 1993, the Board of Regents of Christ College Irvine voted to change the school's name to Concordia University Irvine. At that time, the university became the tenth campus in the national Concordia University System (CUS). In addition to the Concordia University System, the LCMS and its congregations also operate two seminaries, 130 high schools, and more than 900 elementary schools, making it the second largest church-operated school system in the United States.

== Academics ==
The university currently includes five schools: Christ College (School of Theology), School of Arts and Sciences, School of Business, School of Education, and School of Professional Studies; and offers 20 undergraduate majors and 50 specializations, nine graduate programs, four adult bachelor's degree completion programs, and three nursing programs. In 2014, Concordia University Irvine added its first doctoral program, Educational Leadership.

== Campus ==
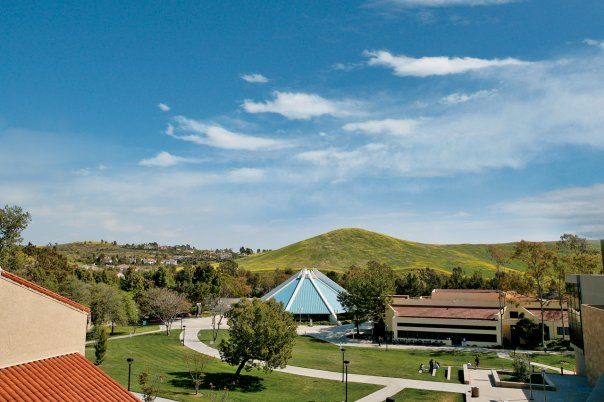
The campus at Concordia University Irvine

The campus is located 50 miles (80 km) south of Los Angeles, 80 miles (130 km) north of San Diego, and 6 miles (9.7 km) inland from the Pacific Ocean in the city of Irvine. Irvine is a planned community which is rated one of the safest cities of its size in the United States. The campus rests on a 70-acre (28 ha) plateau overlooking Orange County surrounded by wildlife.

The offices of the School of Professional Studies - Adult Degree Programs, M.A. International Studies, Nursing programs, and the Masters in Coaching and Athletic Administration (MCAA) teams moved to an offsite location in Irvine.

== Athletics ==
The Concordia University Irvine (CUI) athletic teams are called the Golden Eagles after a school rebrand in August of 2022. The university is a member of the Division II level of the National Collegiate Athletic Association (NCAA), primarily competing in the Pacific West Conference (PacWest) for most of its sports since the 2015–16 academic year; while its men's volleyball team competes in the Mountain Pacific Sports Federation (MPSF); and its men's & women's water polo teams compete in the Western Water Polo Association (WWPA). CUI previously competed in the Golden State Athletic Conference (GSAC) of the National Association of Intercollegiate Athletics (NAIA) from 1987–88 to 2014–15; and as an NAIA Independent from 1981–82 to 1986–87. Prior to moving to the WWPA, the CUI women's water polo team competed in the Golden Coast Conference (GCC) through the end of the 2025 spring season.

CUI competes in 20 intercollegiate varsity sports: Men's sports include baseball, basketball, cross country, lacrosse, soccer, track & field, volleyball and water polo; while women's sports include softball, basketball, beach volleyball, cross country, lacrosse, soccer, stunt, track & field, indoor volleyball and water polo. Former sports included men's and women's tennis and men's and women's swim and diving, which were discontinued after the conclusion of the 2024-25 season.

=== Accomplishments ===
The university was previously a member of the NAIA from 1981 to 2015. During that time, Concordia earned 7 NAIA Team National Championships and 25 NAIA Individual National Championships. In addition to the NAIA championships, CUI won 26 GSAC Regular-Season Championships and 13 GSAC Tournament Championships.

== LGBT prohibition ==
Concordia University Irvine's code of conduct for students prohibits sexual intimacy for unmarried people, and defines marriage as heterosexual only.

In 2018, Concordia hosted a religious liberty and discrimination debate featuring LGBT-rights advocate John Corvino and religious liberty advocate Ryan T. Anderson. Concordia hosted the annual conference of Exodus International until the organization was disbanded in 2013 because of the failure of conversion therapy to make people straight.

== Rankings ==
In U.S. News & World Report's 2013 rankings of the best colleges in America, Concordia University Irvine is listed as 63rd in the Western region. In 2016, the university earned a ranking of 55 among regional universities in the Western U.S.

In 2015, The Chronicle of Higher Education ranked Concordia University Irvine as one of the fastest-growing private nonprofit master's universities in its 2015–2016 edition of Almanac of Higher Education, noting that the university grew over a 10-year period (2003–2013).

Also in 2015, Money magazine included Concordia University Irvine in a list of schools "that provide the best value for your tuition dollar."

== Notable alumni and faculty ==
- Tayshia Adams – phlebotomist, replacement lead in The Bachelorette (16th season)
- Cameron Gliddon – professional basketball player in Australia
- Rocky Larson – head coach of the Mayville State Comets football team
- Misty May-Treanor – three-time Olympic gold medalist; beach volleyball champion
- Angie Ned – college basketball coach
- J. A. O. Preus III – former president of Concordia
- Christian Ramirez – professional soccer player
- Rod Rosenbladt – professor of theology
- John Shimkus – Congressman from Illinois
- Larry Tieu (2007) – ASEAN Basketball League player for the Saigon Heat

== See also ==
- List of colleges and universities in California
