= Diamond Bluff (CDP), Wisconsin =

Census-designated place in Wisconsin, United States

Diamond Bluff, Wisconsin
- Census-designated place
- Location within Wisconsin
- Coordinates: 44°39′02″N 92°37′45″W
- Country: United States
- State: Wisconsin
- County: Pierce

Area
  - Total: 1.750 sq mi (4.53 km^{2})
  - Land: 1.750 sq mi (4.53 km^{2})
  - Water: 0 sq mi (0 km^{2})
- Elevation: 735 ft (224 m)

Population (2020)
  - Total: 184
  - Density: 105/sq mi (40.6/km^{2})
- Time zone: UTC-6 (Central (CST))
  - Summer (DST): UTC-5 (CDT)
- Area codes: 715 & 534
- GNIS feature ID: 1563960

Diamond Bluff is a census-designated place in the town of Diamond Bluff, Pierce County, Wisconsin, United States. Its population was 184 as of the 2020 census.

Historical population
Census	Pop.	Note	%±
2010	194		—
2020	184		−5.2%
U.S. Decennial Census
