= Larry Tieu =

American professional basketball player (born 1986)

Free agent
- Position: Point guard / shooting guard

Personal information
- Born: July 13, 1986 (age 40)
- Listed height: 6 ft 3 in (1.91 m)
- Listed weight: 198 lb (90 kg)

Career information
- High school: John A. Rowland High School (Rowland Heights, California)
- College: Concordia (2004–2007); Biola (2007–2008)
- NBA draft: 2008: undrafted
- Playing career: 2012–present

Career history
- 2012–2014: Saigon Heat

Career highlights
- San Gabriel Valley Player of the Year; 2003 Big Time "C" Division MVP

Larry Tieu (born July 13, 1986) is an American professional basketball player who last played for the Saigon Heat of the ASEAN Basketball League (ABL). Tieu holds dual citizenship in the United States and Vietnam due to his parents having Vietnamese citizenship.

== High school ==
In high school, Tieu attended Rowland High School. He played 4 years of Varsity basketball and started all 4 years. Larry and the Raiders captured league championships in 2002, 2003, and 2004. In the summer prior to his senior year, Larry made the all tournament team at the prestigious 2003 Adidas "Big Time" tournament. In his senior year, Larry was selected as the San Gabriel Valley Player of the Year.

== College ==
Tieu started his college career at Concordia University in 2004. However, he would leave Concordia in his junior year and would finish his career at Biola University.

== Pro career ==
=== Saigon Heat ===
In 2012, Tieu joined the Heat before the start of the 2013 ABL season.
