= Mark W. Yusko =

American hedge fund manager

- Born: 1963 (age 62–63)
- Education: University of Notre Dame (BS); University of Chicago (MBA)
- Occupations: Investor, hedge fund manager
- Years active: 1993–present
- Organization: Morgan Creek Capital Management
- Title: Founder, CEO and chief investment officer

Mark W. Yusko (born 1963) is an American investor, hedge fund manager, and investment executive. He is the founder, chief investment officer and managing director of Morgan Creek Capital Management, an investment management firm that advises pension funds, endowments and wealthy individuals.

== Early life and education ==
Yusko was born and raised in Seattle, Washington. He graduated from the University of Notre Dame in 1985 with a bachelor's degree in biology and chemistry and received an MBA in accounting and finance from the University of Chicago in 1987.

== Investment career ==
After completing his MBA, Yusko worked as a fixed-income portfolio manager at MMI Companies in Chicago and later joined Disciplined Investment Advisors, a value-oriented equity management firm in Evanston, Illinois.

From 1993 to 1998, he was a Senior Investment Director at the University of Notre Dame Investment Office. Yusko left Notre Dame in 1998 to head the endowment office at the University of North Carolina at Chapel Hill. From 1998 to 2004, Yusko was founder and chief executive of the UNC Management Company. Yusko left UNC to found Morgan Creek Capital Management in 2004.

In 2004, Morgan Creek Capital Management, LLC partnered with Salient Partners LP to start The Endowment Fund. After reaching about $3.5 billion in assets, Yusko served as chief investment officer for the Fund until January 2013, when Yusko was removed for poor fund performance. Large redemptions by investors prompted The Endowment Fund in October 2012 to announce that investor withdrawals would be limited. In 2014, The Endowment Fund announced that investors could withdraw from the fund, but at significant discounts.

Yusko is a frequent commentator on the alternative investment industry and has appeared on CNBC, Bloomberg TV, Fox Business, and other major networks as well as in newspapers including the New York Times and Wall Street Journal. He is a proponent of the Endowment Model of investing, which favors diversified strategies by asset class and within each asset class in both public and private markets.

== Philanthropy ==
The Morgan Creek Foundation: The Morgan Creek Foundation was established in 2005 and receives a portion of the profits of Morgan Creek Capital Management each year. The Foundation awards grants to education-focused, community-based, non-profit organizations. In 2011, the Foundation received the Chapel Hill-Carrboro Chamber of Commerce's "Non-Profit of the Year" award.

The Hesburgh-Yusko Scholars Program: In 2009, Yusko and his wife, Stacey, founded The Hesburgh-Yusko Scholars Program, a four-year, merit-based scholarship and leadership development program, with a $35 million gift to the University of Notre Dame. The Yuskos’ benefaction was the third-largest gift in the University’s history and was substantial enough to land them on the Slate 60 list of the largest American charitable contributions of 2009. The Program gave 25 scholarship awards in Spring 2010 and 26 awards in Spring 2011.

Yusko has also served on the boards of several North Carolina–based non-profits, including Carolina Meadows, a non-profit retirement community in Chapel Hill; MCNC, a technology and economic-development organization in the Research Triangle Park; and the Weaver Foundation, in Greensboro.

In 2018, Morgan Creek expanded its activities in digital assets through Morgan Creek Digital. That year, Morgan Creek Digital partnered with Bitwise Asset Management to launch the Digital Asset Index Fund, which was designed to provide institutional investors with exposure to cryptocurrencies.

== See also ==
- List of University of North Carolina at Chapel Hill people
- List of University of Notre Dame people
- List of University of Chicago people
