= Chalmer Davee Library =

University library in River Falls, Wisconsin, US

Coordinates: 44.853444°N 92.622487°W

The Chalmer DaVee Library is a library located at the University of Wisconsin–River Falls, in River Falls, Wisconsin.

== History ==
The Chalmer DaVee Library was dedicated to Dr. Chalmer DaVee in 1997. A member of the Board of Regents in 1945, DaVee insisted that the school offer a liberal arts program, and was a firm supporter of River Falls being a part of the building program, which led to the building of Hathorn Hall and the library, as well as an Industrial Arts building. Plans were also in the making for a new health and physical education building. Upon the building of the library, the Board of Regents unanimously agreed that the library be named the Chalmer DaVee library, after Dr. DaVee. DaVee later left the Board and went on to work at a Veteran's hospital in Biloxi, Missouri.

== About the Library ==
The Chalmer Davee Library is located between the Kleinpell Fine Arts building and South Hall and directly across from Hathorn Hall and the Wyman Education Building. It is the only library located on the University of Wisconsin-River Falls campus. The library's director is Maureen Olle-LaJoie.

The lower level of the library building is home to multiple computer labs, the Academic Success Center, which is where UW-River Falls students can go for tutoring and guidance, as well as the Archives.

Upstairs, on the main level, is the Chalmer Davee Library proper. Here, you can check out AV items - such as popular DVDs, CDs, VHS tapes, as well as books and journals. Books on the main level include reference books, popular literature novels, government documents and the journal stacks.

The second floor provides a space for UW-River Falls students to study, and is a designated quiet area. In addition to multiple desks and couches for students, there are four study rooms and a computer lab located upstairs, in which classes are occasionally taught. The CMC, or children's, collection is also located upstairs. This collection contains children's books, as well as teaching materials for Elementary Education majors. The main stacks, which are all other academic books available, are also located on the second level.

On the University of Wisconsin's Facebook meme page, the library has been incorrectly identified as a "textile museum". However, the Chalmer Davee library has several handmade quilts on display, as well as various pieces of art.
