= Zhang Lei (host) =

Chinese television presenter (born 1979)

- 张蕾
- Born: April 1, 1979 (age 47); Yangquan, Shanxi, China
- Education: Communication University of China
- Occupation: Television host
- Years active: 2006–present
- Television: China Central Television (CCTV)
- Spouse: Wang Jicai (m. 2013)

Chinese name
- Traditional Chinese: 張蕾
- Simplified Chinese: 张蕾
Transcriptions
Standard Mandarin
- Hanyu Pinyin: Zhāng Léi

Zhang Lei (Chinese: 张蕾; born 1 April 1979) is a Chinese television presenter, best known for her work on China Central Television (CCTV) programmes such as Zongyi Shengdian and Happy China Trip.

== Biography ==
Zhang was born in Yangquan, Shanxi on April 1, 1979. She graduated from the Communication University of China. On January 1, 2017, she won the first prize among over 11000 contestants in CCTV's TV program called Challenge Anchor. Since then, she joined the China Central Television (CCTV) as a host of Happy China Trip. She is now the host of Zongyi Shengdian. On January 27, 2017, she co-presented the CCTV New Year's Gala with Zhu Jun in Guilin branch venue.

== Personal life ==
Rumor has it that Zhang Lei was married to Wang Jicai (Chinese: 王吉财), chairman of the board of Woyuan Group, on June 1, 2013.
