= Michael Norman (author) =

American author (born 1947)

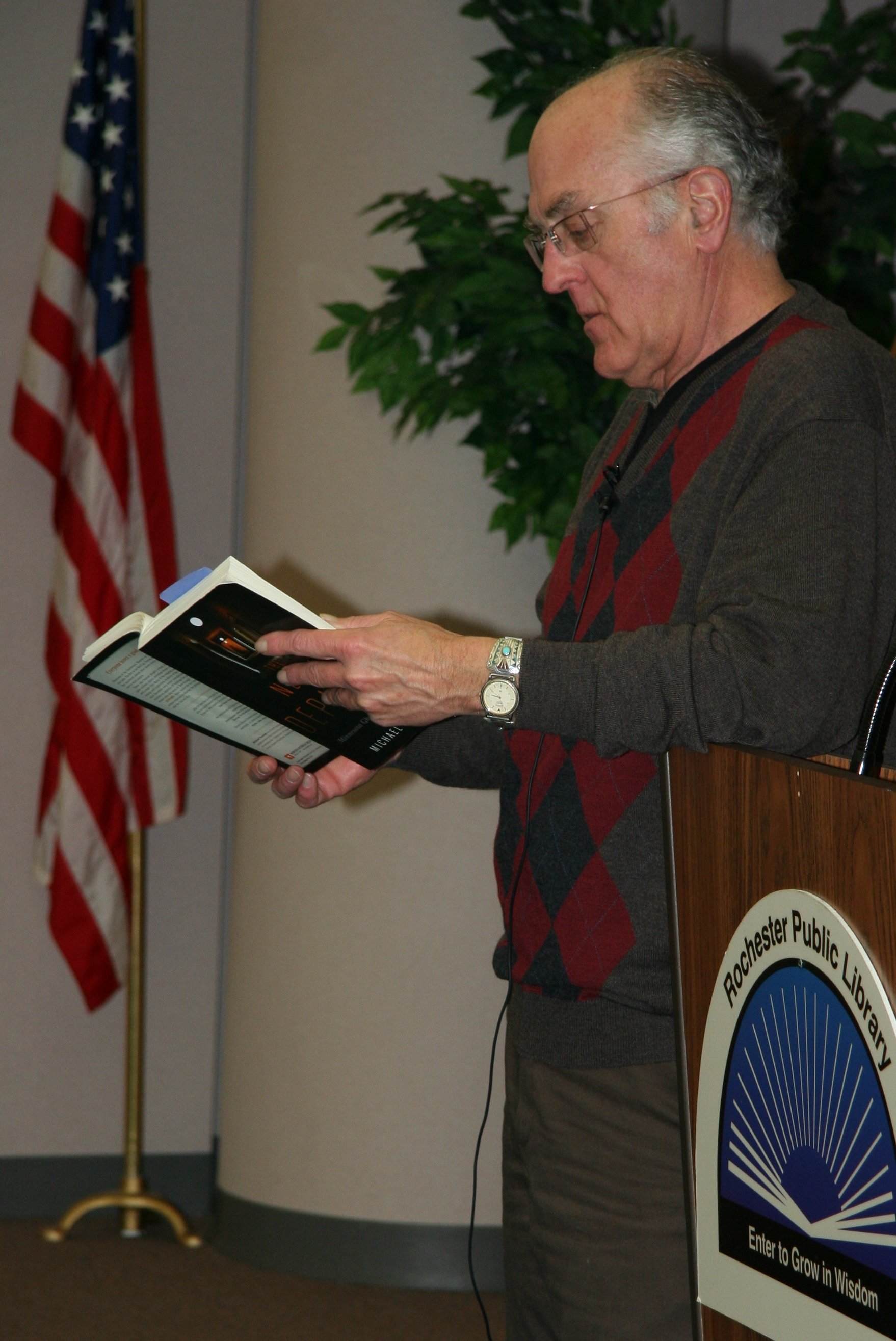
Michael Norman in 2009

Michael Norman (June 29, 1947 – August 6, 2021) was an American author known for his supernatural book series Haunted which he has written alongside fellow author Beth Scott. Norman, who hailed from Illinois, graduated with a master's degree from Northern Illinois University in 1969. He worked at the University of Wisconsin–River Falls journalism department from 1973 until his retirement in May 2003. In 1996, Norman made a guest appearance in the Annie Award-nominated talk show Space Ghost Coast to Coast. He later spoke about Haunted Hollywood on the Travel Channel, which was Number 9 on the countdown of World's Creepiest Destinations. This author is survived by his wife Janell and son James.

== Bibliography ==
=== Haunted series ===
==== With Beth Scott ====
- Haunted Wisconsin (1980) ISBN 0-88361-082-5
- Haunted Heartland (1985) ISBN 0-88361-092-2
- Haunted America (1994) ISBN 0-312-85751-9 ISBN 0812550544
- Historic Haunted America (1995) ISBN 0-312-85752-7
- Haunted Heritage (2002) ISBN 0-7653-0173-3

==== Solo ====
- Haunted Homeland (2006) ISBN 0-7653-0172-5 ISBN 9780765301727

=== Plays ===
- Entering the Circle: The Lives of Pioneer Farm Women
- Nye and Riley Tonight!

=== Other ===
- WordWise: Vocabulary Guides to Enhance Your Real-World Conversations (2006) ISBN 1-9330-5427-1
- Haunted Encounters: Real-life Stories of Supernatural Experiences (2009) ISBN 0-8735-1717-2
