= Diamond Bluff, Wisconsin =

- Town
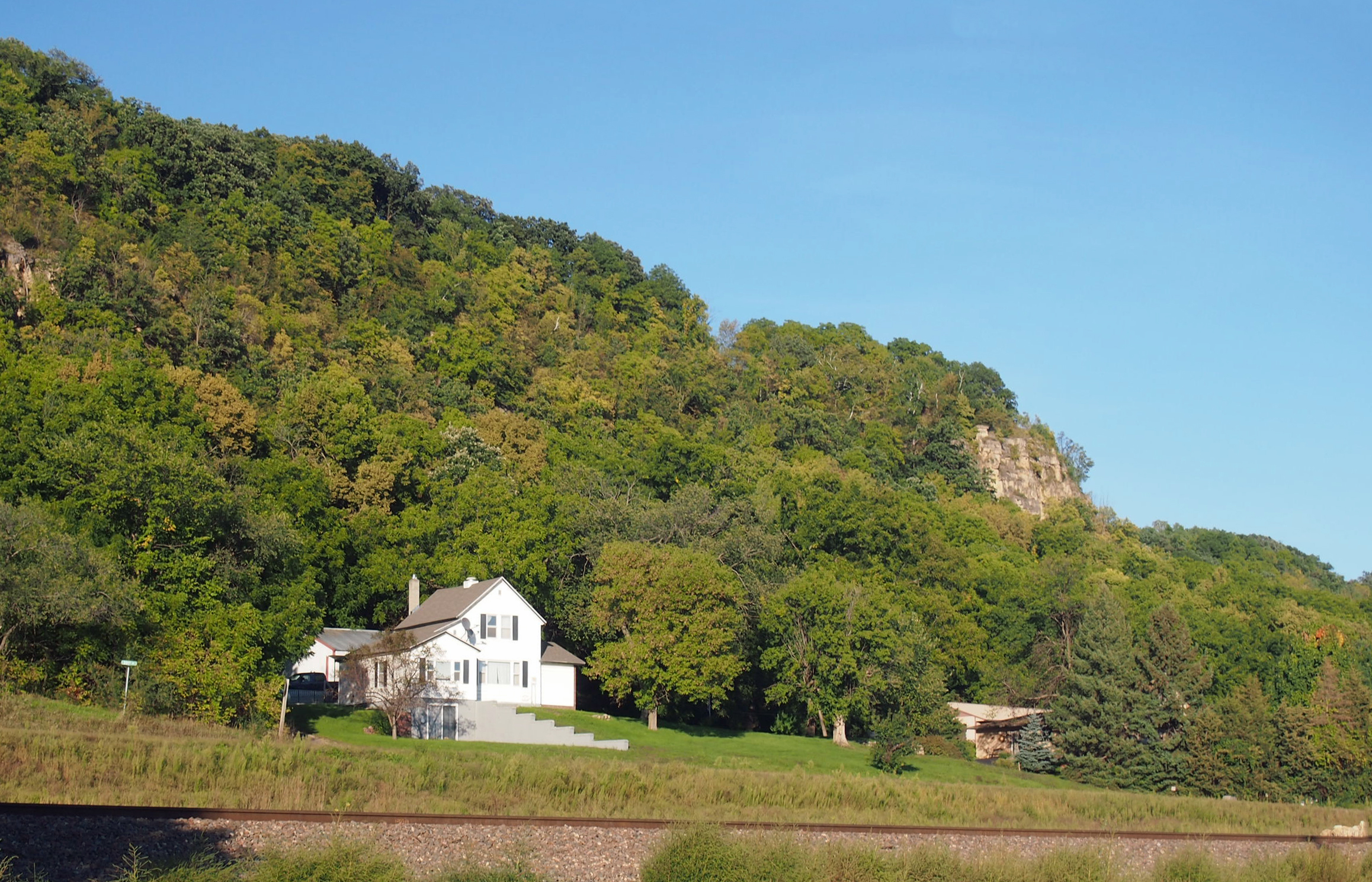

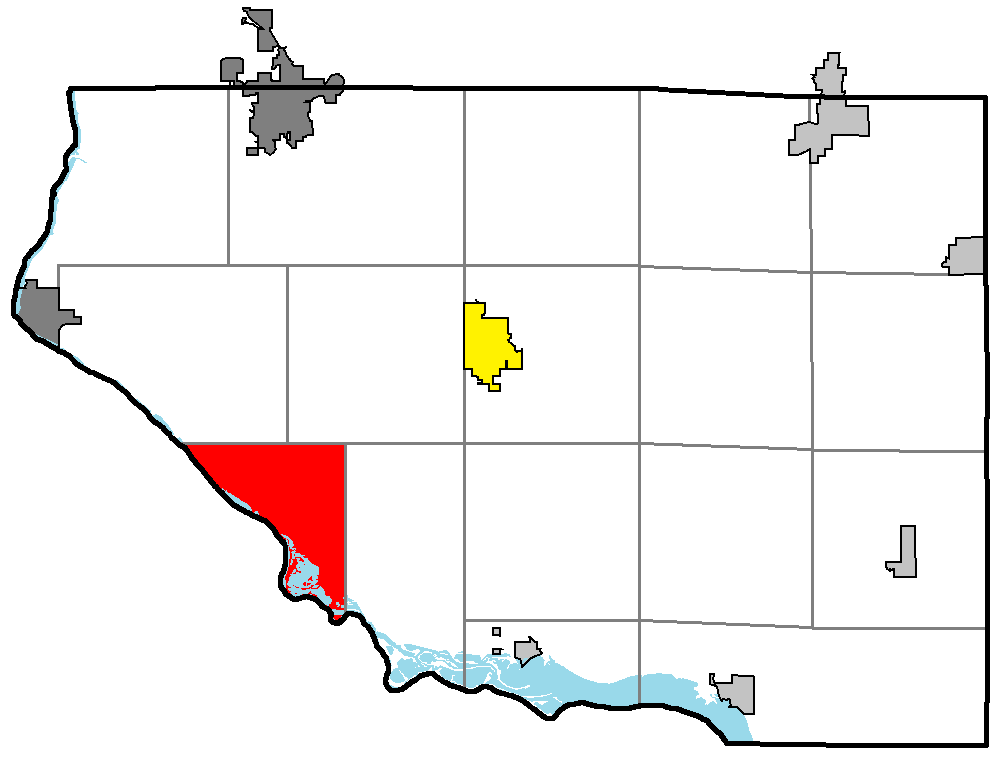
- Location of Diamond Bluff, within Pierce County

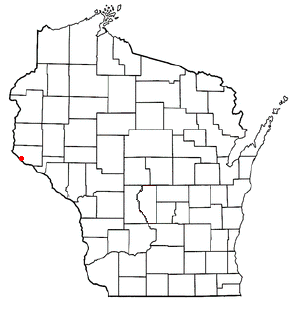
- Location of Diamond Bluff, Wisconsin
- Coordinates: 44°38′25″N 92°36′38″W
- Country: United States
- State: Wisconsin
- County: Pierce

Area
  - Total: 18.3 sq mi (47.5 km^{2})
  - Land: 16.7 sq mi (43.2 km^{2})
  - Water: 1.7 sq mi (4.3 km^{2})
- Elevation: 1,040 ft (317 m)

Population (2020)
  - Total: 478
  - Density: 28.7/sq mi (11.1/km^{2})
- Time zone: UTC-6 (Central (CST))
  - Summer (DST): UTC-5 (CDT)
- Area codes: 715 & 534
- FIPS code: 55-20150
- GNIS feature ID: 1583084
- Website: www.diamondbluffwi.gov

Diamond Bluff is a town in Pierce County, Wisconsin, United States. The population was 478 at the 2020 census.

== Geography ==
According to the United States Census Bureau, the town has a total area of 18.3 square miles (47.4 km^{2}), of which 16.7 square miles (43.2 km^{2}) is land and 1.6 square miles (4.3 km^{2}) (9.01%) is water.

The unincorporated community of Diamond Bluff is located in the town. A French settler, Monte Diamond, named the community after the area's limestone bluffs. The community contains a park, the Sea Wing Memorial Park and Diamond Bluff Cemetery. Residents of Diamond Bluff are known as "The Bluffers." The community's ZIP code is 54014.

== Demographics ==
As of the census of 2000, there were 479 people, 184 households, and 140 families residing in the town. The population density was 28.7 inhabitants per square mile (11.1/km^{2}). There were 203 housing units at an average density of 12.2 per square mile (4.7/km^{2}). The racial makeup of the town was 98.96% White, 0.63% Native American and 0.42% Asian. Hispanic or Latino of any race were 0.42% of the population.

There were 184 households, out of which 31.0% had children under the age of 18 living with them, 64.7% were married couples living together, 4.9% had a female householder with no husband present, and 23.4% were non-families. 18.5% of all households were made up of individuals, and 8.2% had someone living alone who was 65 years of age or older. The average household size was 2.60 and the average family size was 2.92.

In the town, the population was spread out, with 23.6% under the age of 18, 7.9% from 18 to 24, 29.2% from 25 to 44, 30.1% from 45 to 64, and 9.2% who were 65 years of age or older. The median age was 40 years. For every 100 females, there were 111.0 males. For every 100 females age 18 and over, there were 114.0 males.

The median income for a household in the town was $52,031, and the median income for a family was $58,333. Males had a median income of $40,804 versus $23,750 for females. The per capita income for the town was $22,002. About 3.8% of families and 3.7% of the population were below the poverty line, including 1.9% of those under age 18 and none of those age 65 or over.

== Government ==
The Diamond Bluff Town Board consists of a chair, two supervisors, a town treasurer and a town clerk. Board meetings are typically held on the second Thursday of each month.

== Historical places ==
- The Diamond Bluff Site-Mero Mound Group, an archeological site, is located within the town.
