= Glen Park Municipal Swimming Pool =

- U.S. National Register of Historic Places
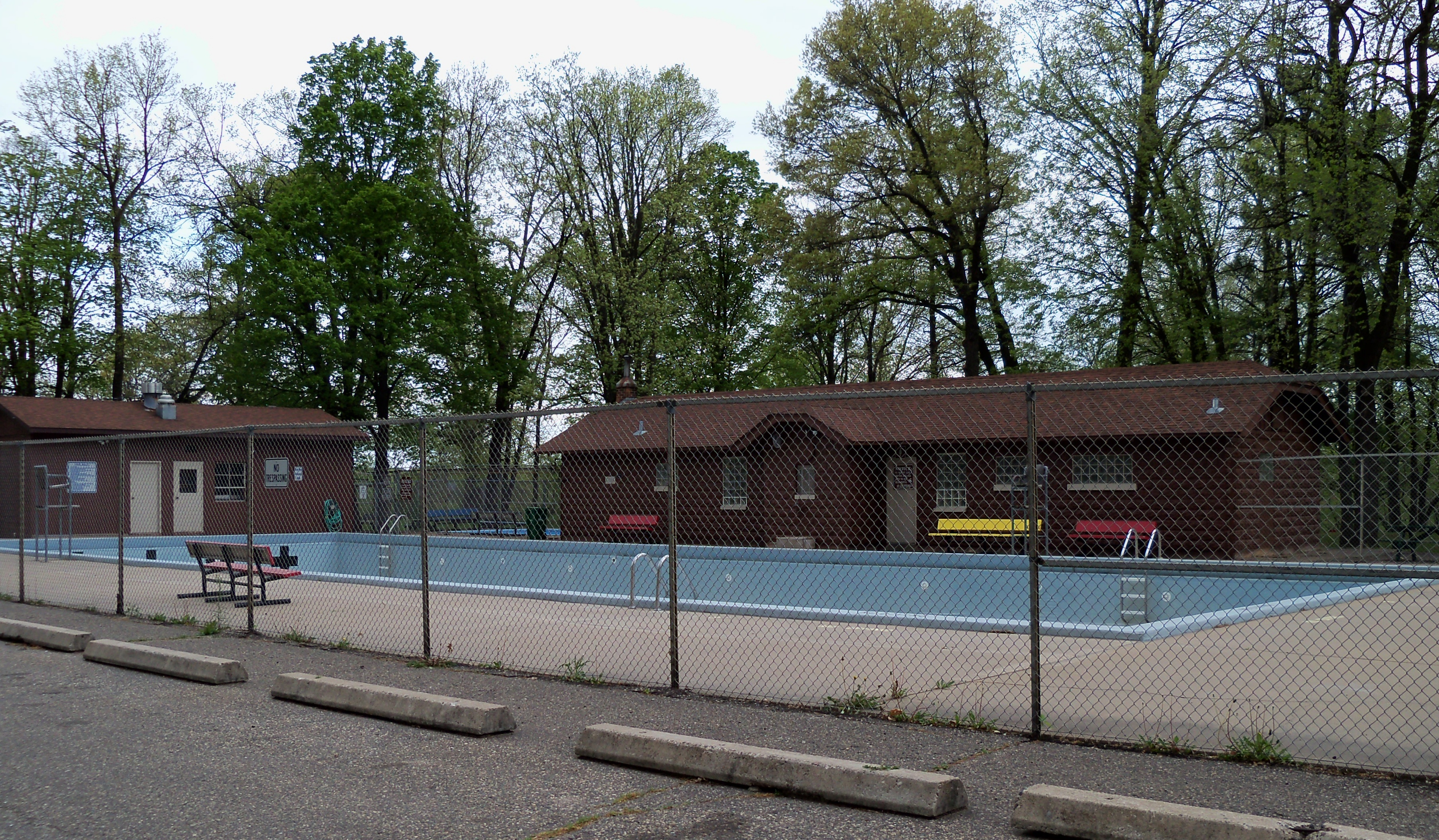
- The pool in 2010

- Location within Wisconsin Location within the United States
- Location: 355 Park St., River Falls, Wisconsin
- Coordinates: 44°51′18″N 92°38′0″W
- Area: less than one acre
- Built: 1937
- Built by: Harry R. Luberg
- Engineer: Herman T. Hagestad
- Architectural style: Late 19th And Early 20th Century American Movements
- NRHP reference No.: 07000542
- Added to NRHP: June 5, 2007

Glen Park Municipal Swimming Pool is a historic swimming pool in River Falls, Wisconsin. The complex includes a pool and two American Craftsman Style buildings. The pool was built as a Civil Works Administration project during the Great Depression. Work on the pool began in 1933-34 and continued through 1937 with additional support from the Public Works Administration and Works Progress Administration. Engineer Herman T. Hagestad, who would later become city engineer and ultimately mayor of River Falls, designed the pool. The pool was added to the National Register of Historic Places in 2007 and is still operational.
