= South Hall-River Falls State Normal School =

- South Hall, River Falls State Normal School
- U.S. National Register of Historic Places
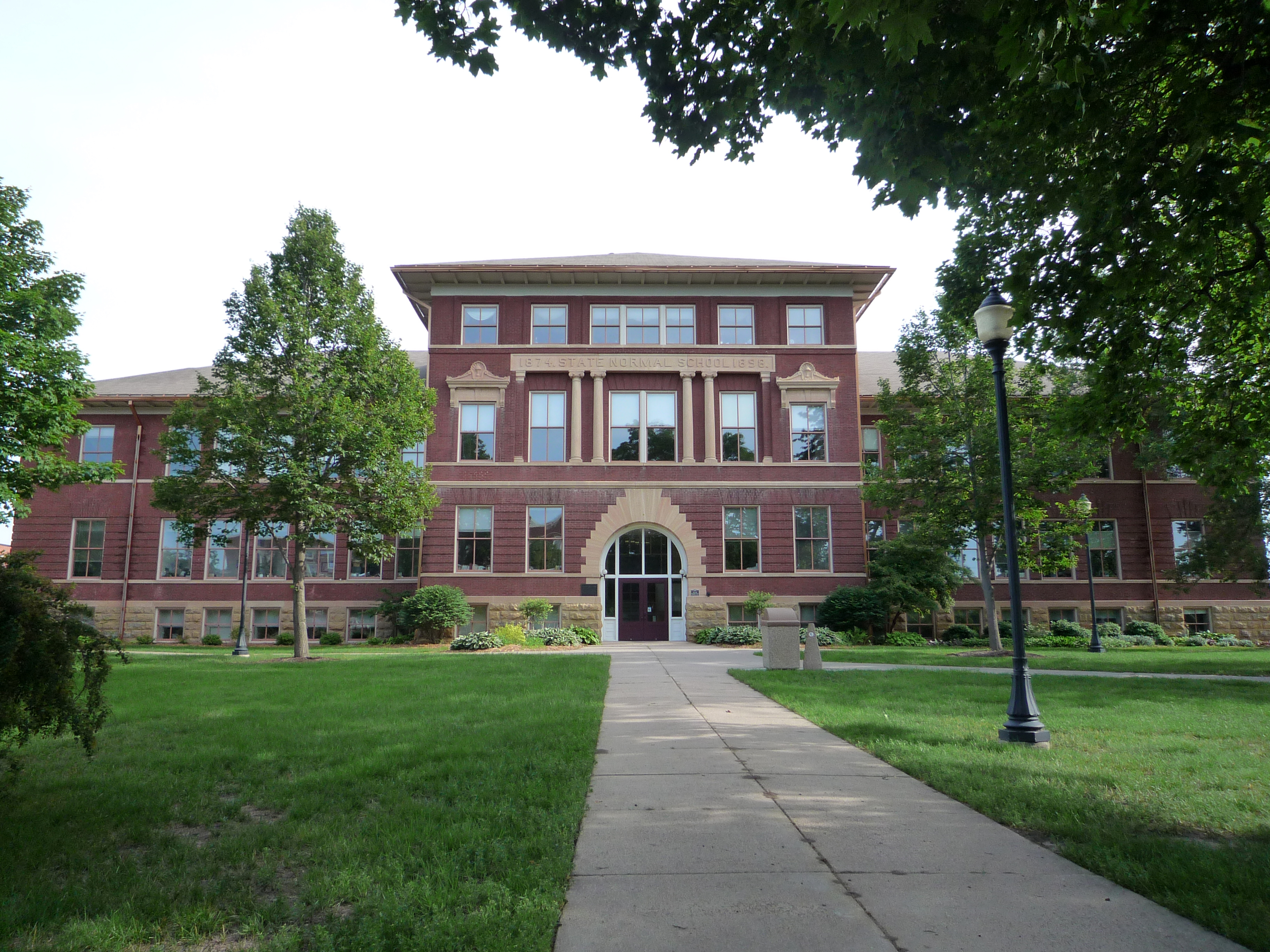
- South Hall

- Location within Wisconsin Location within the United States
- Location: 320 E. Cascade Ave. River Falls, Wisconsin
- Coordinates: 44°51′13″N 92°37′23″W
- Area: 0.5 acres (0.20 ha)
- Built: 1898
- Architect: Waters, William
- NRHP reference No.: 76000073
- Added to NRHP: November 7, 1976

South Hall is located on the campus of what is now the University of Wisconsin-River Falls. It was added to the National Register of Historic Places in 1976.

== History ==
South Hall was built in 1898 after a fire had destroyed the previous building that housed the school a year earlier. The building was designed by Oshkosh architect William Waters. At the time, as the sole building on campus, it was simply known as the "Normal School". It became known by its current name after the construction of North Hall in 1914.
