= Kleinpell Fine Arts =

Coordinates: 44°51′12.7″N 92°37′15.2″W

The Kleinpell Fine Arts (KFA) is an academic building located at the University of Wisconsin–River Falls, in River Falls, Wisconsin.

== History ==
The Kleinpell Fine Arts Center was built in 1973 and was named after E.H. Kleinpell, a former university president. He predicted that the student enrollment would double in 10 years after 1956, and many people did not believe him. His prediction came true, and the total number of students increased from 913 to 3,281. Dr. Kleinpell also influenced adding liberal arts classes to the University and promoted the general education program.

== About the Fine Arts Center ==
The basement of KFA contains art rooms for classes like metals, fibers and sculptures. On the additional wing in KFA there are music rooms.

The first floor of KFA contains the Davis Theater, Abbott Concert Hall, and Art Gallery. The Davis Theater is the used for lectures, musicals and plays and the Abbott Concert Hall is used for musical recitals. The Art Gallery is in the center of the first floor and displays students' art work.

The second and third floors contain classrooms and professors' offices.

The KFA houses the College of Arts and Sciences, the departments of Art, Communication Studies and Theatre Arts, English, Geography and Mapping Sciences, History and Philosophy, Modern Language, Music, Political Science, Sociology, Anthropology, and Criminal Justice.
