= David F. Swensen =

American businessman (1954–2021)

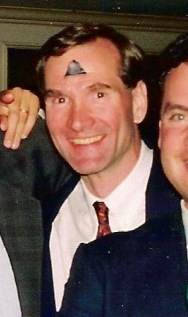
- Born: David Frederick Swensen; January 26, 1954; Ames, Iowa, U.S.
- Died: May 5, 2021 (aged 67); New Haven, Connecticut, U.S.
- Education: University of Wisconsin–River Falls (BS, BA); Yale University (PhD)
- Occupation: Fund manager
- Known for: Managing the Yale endowment
- Scientific career
- Thesis: A Model for the Valuation of Corporate Bonds

David Frederick Swensen (January 26, 1954 – May 5, 2021) was an American endowment fund manager, who was chief investment officer at Yale University from 1985 until his death in May 2021.

Swensen was responsible for managing and investing Yale's endowment assets and investment funds. When Swenson started managing the Yale Endowment in 1985, it was worth $1.3 billion. By 2021 this had grown to $31.2 billion, after disbursements. Average annual returns over the 30 years to 2020 were 12.4%. Swenson was the highest-paid employee in Yale, leading a team of about 30 employees. With Dean Takahashi, he invented an application of the modern portfolio theory known in the investing world as the "Endowment Model" or the "Yale Model".

His investment success with the Yale Endowment attracted the notice of Wall Street portfolio managers and others. "He's right up there with John Bogle, Peter Lynch, [Benjamin] Graham, and [David] Dodd as a major force in investment management," according to Byron Wien, a longtime Wall Street strategist. Investment heads from universities such as Harvard, MIT, Princeton, Wesleyan, and the University of Pennsylvania adopted his allocation strategies to mixed success.

Swensen was listed third on aiCIO's 2012, a list of the 100 most influential institutional investors worldwide. In 2008, he was inducted into Institutional Investors Alpha's Hedge Fund Manager Hall of Fame.

== Early life and education ==
David Frederick Swensen was born in Ames, Iowa, on January 26, 1954, and was raised in River Falls, Wisconsin. His father, Richard David "Dick" Swensen, was a chemistry professor and dean at the University of Wisconsin-River Falls. His mother, Grace Marie (Hartman), after raising six children, became a Lutheran minister. After graduating from River Falls High School in 1971 Swensen elected to stay in his hometown of River Falls and receive his B.A. and B.S. in 1975 from the University of Wisconsin-River Falls where his father Richard Swensen was a professor. Swensen pursued a PhD in economics at Yale, where he wrote his dissertation, A Model for the Valuation of Corporate Bonds. One of Swensen's dissertation advisers at Yale was James Tobin, a top economic adviser to John F. Kennedy administration and a future Nobel Prize laureate in economics. According to Charles Ellis, founder of Greenwich Associates and former chair of Yale's investment committee, "When it snowed, David went to Jim's house to shovel the sidewalk". James Tobin's Nobel Prize, among other things, was for his contribution in creation of Modern Portfolio Theory. Swensen was fascinated by the idea of Modern Portfolio Theory. During his 2018 reunion speech Swensen said: "For a given level of return, if you diversify you can get that return at lower risk. For a given level of risk, if you diversify you can get a higher return. That's pretty cool! Free lunch!"

== Early investment career ==
Following his academic interest in valuation of corporate bonds, Swensen joined Salomon Brothers in 1980. This career move was suggested by a Salomon Brothers investment banker and Yale alumnus, Gene Dattel, who was deeply impressed by Swensen. In 1981 Swensen worked as an associate in corporate finance for Salomon Brothers to structure the world's first currency swap agreement, a deal between IBM and the World Bank which allowed IBM to hedge their exposure to Swiss francs and German marks and the World Bank to make loans in those currencies more efficiently.

Swensen then spent three years as senior vice president at Lehman Brothers, where he helped set up the firm's swap operations.

== Yale University endowment ==
Swensen was recruited to serve as the Yale endowment manager at age 31 in 1985. This position was offered by Swensen's other dissertation adviser, Yale's provost, William Brainard. Swensen's candidacy was suggested by James Tobin, who, despite his former student's young age, believed he could be the right person. Swensen was hesitant about taking the job at first, since he did not know much about portfolio management aside from his studies in graduate school. Nevertheless, Brainard convinced him to take the position and Swensen started on April 1, 1985, taking an 80% pay cut. A year later, in 1986, he was joined by Yale College and School of Management graduate Dean Takahashi, who soon became Swensen's trusted deputy.

Returns were higher in Swenson's early years. As of 2005, the fund had managed annualized returns of 16.1%. According to former Yale President, economist Richard Levin, Swensen's "contribution" to Yale is greater than the sum of all the donations made in more than two decades. Levin noted Swensen's "uncanny ability" to pick the best outside money managers. Over the years, this contributed the majority of the endowment's "alpha". Swensen did extensive due diligence before investing (or not investing) with external managers. Swenson was able to hire promising students from the university. Several of Swensen's former staff members went on to manage other university endowments, including MIT, Stanford University and the University of Pennsylvania.

In 2014, Swensen stated "One of the things that I care most deeply about is that notion that anyone who qualifies for admission can afford to go to Yale, and financial aid is a huge part of what the endowment does".

In September 2014, Swensen began to move the Yale endowment away from investment in companies that have a large greenhouse footprint, expressing Yale's preferences in a letter to the endowment's money managers. The letter asked them to consider the effect of their investments on climate change, and to refrain from investing in companies that do not make reasonable efforts to reduce carbon emissions. This method was characterized by Swensen as a more subtle and flexible approach, as opposed to outright divestment. In 2018 Swensen stated Yale would not invest in companies that sold assault weapons.

In 2018 Swensen published an op-ed in the Yale Daily News, identifying errors in the News' reporting. Swensen stated "In the more than three decades that I have managed Yale's endowment, the honesty of the activists and the reporting of the News have deteriorated", and "reporter[s] should not serve as a megaphone for the activist arguments".

=== The Yale Model ===
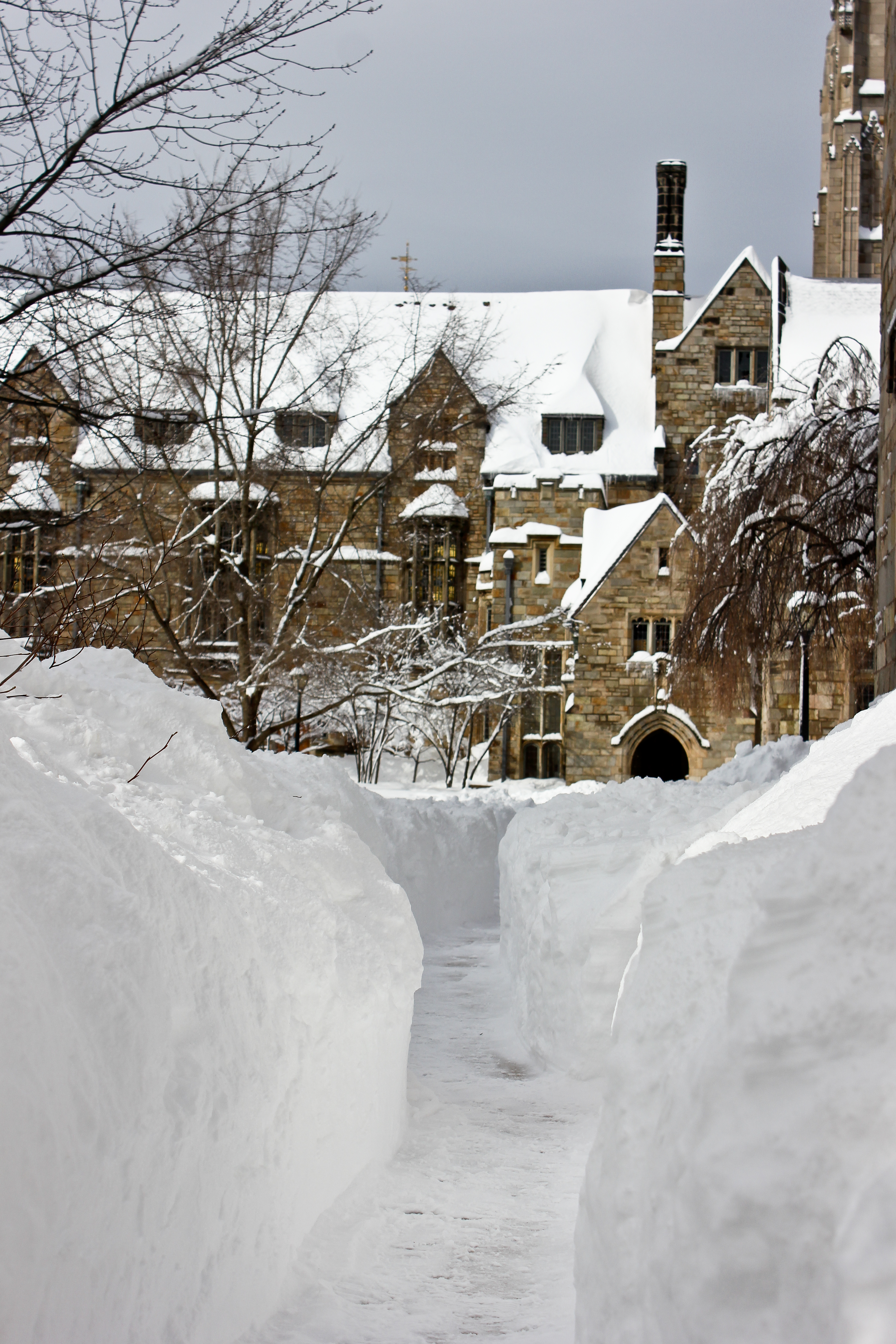
Swensen began advising the Yale Endowment in 1985; having earned his Ph.D. from the school, he coined his investment philosophy "The Yale Model".

The Yale Model, sometimes known as the Endowment Model, was developed by Swensen and Takahashi and is described in Swensen's book Pioneering Portfolio Management. It consists broadly of dividing a portfolio into five or six roughly equal parts and investing each in a different asset class. This allowed Swensen to achieve a higher return than a pure equity portfolio, with lower risk. When Swensen took over the portfolio, it was mostly invested in US stocks, bonds and cash. Swensen diversified into foreign stocks, real estate, commodities, venture capital and buyout firms, and hedge funds which focus on market inefficiencies and distressed businesses. This type of investing – allocating only a small amount to traditional U.S. equities and bonds and more to alternative investments – is followed by many larger endowments and foundations and is therefore also known as the "Endowment Model" (of investing).

Particularly revolutionary at the time was his recognition that liquidity is a bad thing to be avoided rather than a good thing to be sought out, since it comes at a heavy price in the shape of lower returns. As a university endowment investing for the long term, it could tolerate more illiquidity than most investors. The Yale Model is thus characterized by relatively heavy exposure to asset classes such as private equity compared to more traditional portfolios. The model is also characterized by heavy reliance on investment managers in these specialized asset classes, a characteristic that has made manager selection at Yale a famously careful process.

Soon after heading the Yale investment office, Swensen, together with Takahashi, sought out investments that would allow both diversification and higher return. They also implemented strategies that would take advantage of endowment idiosyncrasies: presumption of perpetuity, tax-exempt status, as well as distinguished and devoted alumni in the financial world. Hence, investments were made in venture capital firms, tech firms, and hedge funds. At the early stages not many firms dealt with types of assets Swensen was interested in. In order to invest in such assets he first helped to create those assets by becoming a venture capitalist of venture capitalists. As of 2019 about 60% of Yale endowment portfolio is allocated to alternative investments such as hedge funds, venture capital and private equity.

Under Swensen, the endowment reduced its holdings of domestic equities, which went from its largest asset class to the smallest. At the time of his death, only 14% of the endowment was invested directly in equities. Nonetheless, Swensen stated he increased the equity exposure of the fund, through exposure to alternative asset classes.

In his book "Pioneering Portfolio Management", Swensen argued the reason for Yale investing in illiquid assets is not higher risk-adjusted returns, but that alpha opportunities are greater in illiquid markets because information in illiquid markets is more difficult to gather and analyze. Because of a high exposure to illiquid assets (up to 50% of the portfolio), some safer investments were held to meet university funding needs.

In "Pioneering Portfolio Management", Swensen argues against using consultants to select managers, writing "“Consultants express conventional views... Clients end up with bloated, fee-driven investment management businesses instead of nimble, return-oriented entrepreneurial firms." Institutional Investor notes Swensen put a discussion of spending policy before discussing investing in his book.

==== Criticism of the Endowment Model ====
After Yale's endowment dropped 24.6% during the 2008 financial crisis, a report released in May 2010 by the Tellus Institute argued that endowments had helped to cause the crisis. However, Mark W. Yusko, founder of Morgan Creek Capital Management, argued that one year where endowments did not outperform but rather "tie everybody else" does not break the endowment model. According to Yusko, the endowment model is still the most viable proposition for long-term investors. Investors should also realize that mark-to-market reporting has a bigger impact on reported performance than before.

Many institutional investors have tried to replicate the Swensen Approach and the Yale Model to fit their hedge funds, pensions funds, and endowments, but have not seen the same results. Charles Ellis, a former chair of Yale's investment committee, while not arguing against Yale's model, argued that it is hard to replicate, and that returns from alternative assets are reducing as more money and attention flows to them, leading to more efficient market pricing.

== Views on personal investing ==
In 2005, Swensen wrote a book called Unconventional Success: A Fundamental Approach to Personal Investment, which is an investment guide for the individual investor. The general strategy that he presents can be boiled down to the following three main points of advice:

- The investor should construct a portfolio with money allocated to 6 core asset classes, diversifying among them and biasing toward the equity sections.
- The investor should rebalance the portfolio on a regular basis (rebalancing back to the original weightings of the asset classes in the portfolio).
- In the absence of confidence in a market-beating strategy, invest in low-cost index funds and exchange-traded funds. The investor should be very watchful of costs as some indices are poorly constructed and some fund companies charge excessive fees (or generate large tax liabilities).

Swensen's 6 core asset classes are Treasury inflation protection securities, US government bonds, US real estate funds, emerging market stocks, domestic stocks, and developed world international equities.

Swensen advocated use of not-for-profit fund management companies such as Vanguard to minimize fees and conflicts of interest. He criticises many mutual fund companies for charging excessive fees and not living up to their fiduciary responsibility. He highlights the conflict of interest inherent in for-profit mutual funds, claiming they want high fee, high turnover funds while investors want the opposite.

In January 2009, Swensen criticised high Wall Street pay.

On January 28, 2009, Swensen and Michael Schmidt, a financial analyst at Yale, published an op-ed piece in The New York Times entitled "News You Can Endow" discussing the idea of newspaper organizations run as non-profits by endowments. On August 13, 2011, David Swensen published an op-ed in The New York Times entitled "The Mutual Fund Merry-Go-Round," about how the pursuit of profits by the management companies creates a conflict of interest with fiduciary responsibilities to their investors. The advertising of Morningstar ratings leads investors to chase past leaders and roll money out of recently downgraded or poorly rated funds into recently upgraded or highly rated funds. The result is the equivalent of buying high and selling low and results in returns for a typical investor far worse than simply buying-and-holding the funds themselves, especially for highly volatile areas such as technology funds. People would do better to focus on diversification among sectors and asset classes, which are the main determinants of long-term results.

== Views on capital markets ==
In a 2013 interview with Yale's international center of finance, he stated that capital markets would be much better off under the Glass–Steagall legislation (provisions in the U.S. Banking Act of 1933 that limits the interaction between stock activities within commercial and investment banks). He stated that "commercial banking serves a very important, useful function: gathering of deposits and making of loans, and if we define that function very narrowly and regulate it very heavily and required it to maintain a high level of capital then the capital environment would be much safer."

== Advisory roles ==
In February 2009, Swensen was named to a two-year term on President Barack Obama's Economic Recovery Advisory Board, on which he served from 2009 to 2011.

Swensen was a member of the American Academy of Arts and Sciences and the Council on Foreign Relations. He served as trustee or advisor to the Brookings Institution, Cambridge University, the Carnegie Institution of Washington, the Chan Zuckerberg Initiative, the Hopkins School, TIAA, the Carnegie Corporation, the New York Stock Exchange, the Howard Hughes Medical Institute, the Courtauld Institute of Art, the Yale-New Haven Hospital, The Investment Fund for Foundations (TIFF), the Edna McConnell Clark Foundation, and the States of Connecticut and Massachusetts.

== Personal life ==
Swensen lived in Killingworth, Connecticut. Some Yale alumni had mounted a campaign to name one of two new residential colleges after Swensen; the two residential colleges were ultimately named after Benjamin Franklin and Pauli Murray. In 2023, Yale's School of Management announced the creation of the Swensen Asset Management Institute.

Swensen taught endowment management at Yale College and at the Yale School of Management. He was a fellow of Berkeley College and an incorporator of the Elizabethan Club.

Swensen was first married to Susan Foster, with whom he had three children. He secondly married Meghan McMahon.

Swensen died from kidney cancer at Yale New Haven Hospital on May 5, 2021, aged 67.

== Legacy and honors ==
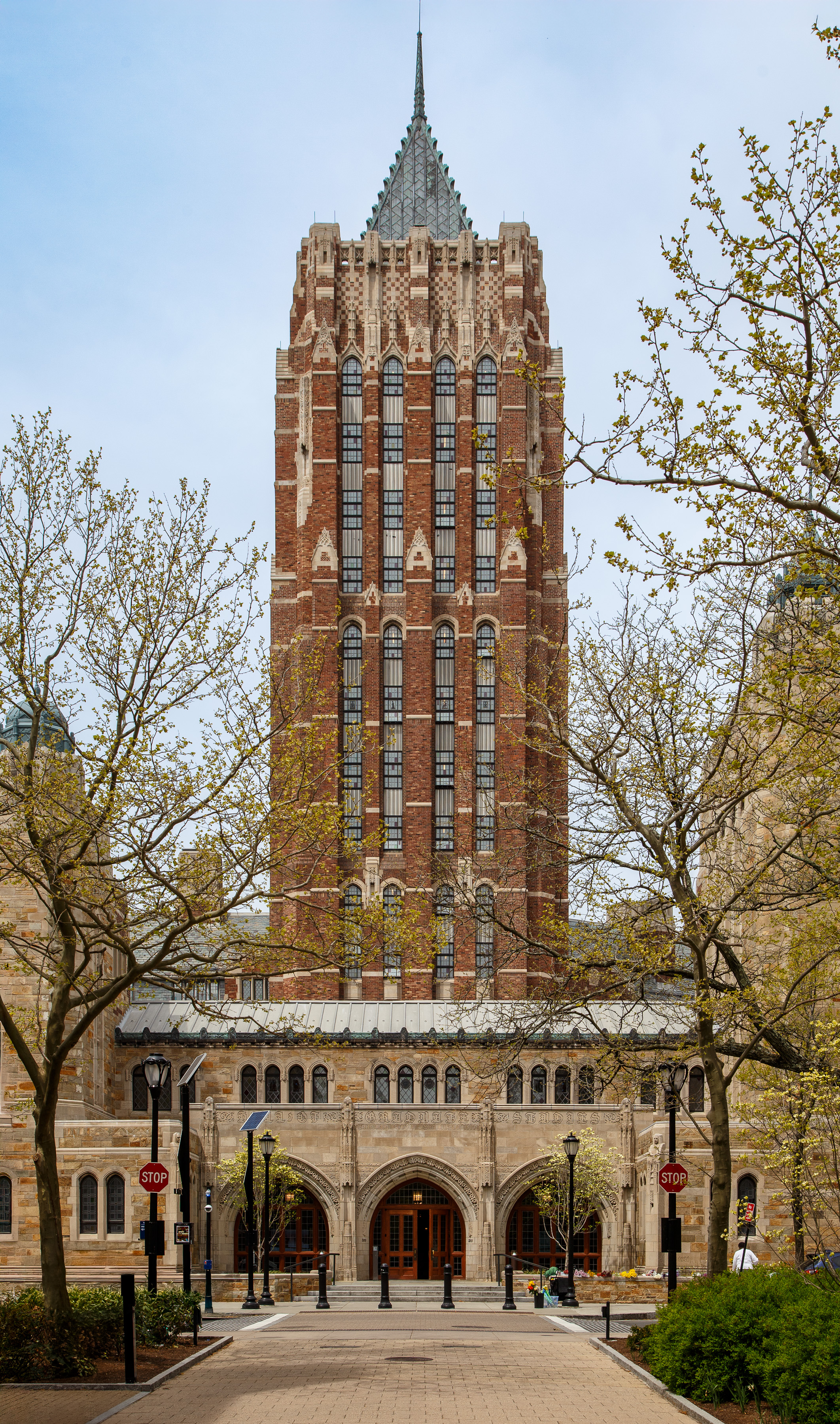
Swensen Tower

Swensen won numerous awards for his investing and management of Yale's endowment. In 2012, he won the Yale Medal for "outstanding individual service to the University." In 2008, he was awarded the American Academy of Arts & Sciences Fellowship and the year prior, the Mory's Cup for "conspicuous service to Yale." Also in 2007, he was awarded the Hopkins Medal "for commitment, devotion and loyalty to Hopkins School." In 2004, he won the Institutional Investor Award for Excellence in Investment Management.

In 2008, he was inducted into Institutional Investors Alpha's Hedge Fund Manager Hall of Fame along with Alfred Jones, Bruce Kovner, George Soros, Jack Nash, James Simons, Julian Roberston, Kenneth Griffin, Leon Levy, Louis Bacon, Michael Steinhardt, Paul Tudor Jones, Seth Klarman and Steven A. Cohen.

The tower of Yale's Humanities Quadrangle (formerly the Hall of Graduate Studies) was renamed Swensen Tower in March 2015.

== See also ==
- List of University of Wisconsin-River Falls people
- List of Yale University alumni

== Bibliography ==
- Pioneering Portfolio Management: An Unconventional Approach to Institutional Investment (2000) ISBN 0-684-86443-6, Free Press
- Pioneering Portfolio Management: An Unconventional Approach to Institutional Investment, Fully Revised and Updated (2009) ISBN 978-1-4165-4469-2, Free Press
- Unconventional Success: A Fundamental Approach to Personal Investment (2005) ISBN 0-7432-2838-3, Free Press
