= Yale University endowment =

Endowment by American university

The Yale University endowment is the world's second-largest university endowment and has a reputation as one of the best-performing investment portfolios in American higher education. The endowment was established at Yale University, then Yale College, in 1718 from an initial fund of £562 provided by Elihu Yale and has grown to more than $40 billion in value over the ensuing 300 years. It is managed by the Yale Investments Office.

== History ==
Yale University was founded as "the Collegiate School" in 1701. In 1718, Elihu Yale sold a portion of his collection of gems and furniture to provide an initial fund of £562 for the establishment of the school's endowment. From 1985 until 2021, the Chief Investment Officer of Yale was alumnus David Swensen, who was replaced by alumnus Matthew Mendelsohn. As of 2013, the chairman of the Yale Investment Committee, which provides oversight of the endowment, was Douglas A. Warner III.

== Investments and performance ==
The endowment was valued at $44.1 billion as of June 30, 2025. It reported a return of 11.1% for the 2025 fiscal year, which outperformed the median return of major college and university endowments. The endowment had an annualized 9.4% return over the past decade. Since the early 1990s, the endowment has generated annual returns for the university of approximately 11.3 percent, with a portion of the annual return forming part of the university's operating budget and the remainder reinvested to grow the size of the endowment. Spending from revenue earned off the endowment accounted for $1.2 billion of the university's operating budget in 2017, $1.5 billion in 2021, and $2.1 billion in 2025. The university aims to spend approximately 5.25 percent of the endowment on its annual operating budget.

The endowment has become known for seeking out "unconventional assets" and for investments in emerging businesses. In the 1990s it invested in Google and Amazon and was later an early investor in Facebook, LinkedIn, and Airbnb. As of 2016, its venture capital investments had averaged 93-percent returns over the preceding two decades.

== Issues ==
In 2016 the State of Connecticut considered taxing Yale's investment returns as a way of plugging a gap in the state budget. The university objected, in part, on the grounds that such a move would be a violation of the tax exemption guaranteed to the university by the Colony of Connecticut in 1745.

Beginning in the early 2000s, some criticized the size of compensation given to the endowment's managers. In 2015, Swensen earned $4.5 million, making him the highest-paid employee at the university, surpassing the compensation of even university president Peter Salovey. Others have said the salaries of endowment managers are justifiable, asserting that they are less than what could be earned in the private sector and pay for themselves with the endowment's high rates of return.

Yale's endowment has been widely criticized for its investments in fossil fuel companies, Puerto Rican debt, private prisons, companies which provide services to Immigration and Customs Enforcement, subprime mortgage lending companies, and for other controversial holdings. In December 2018, after years of criticism from campus fossil fuel divestment groups, Yale University arrested 48 student activists for staging a sit-in at the Yale Investment Office to protest Yale’s holdings in the fossil fuel industry and Puerto Rican debt. That same quarter Yale sold 99 percent of its direct investment holdings in Antero Resource Corporation, a natural gas and oil company, according to Yale’s 2018 filing with the Securities and Exchange Commission.

== See also ==
- List of colleges and universities in the United States by endowment
