= Edward N. Peterson =

American historian

- Born: August 28, 1925; St. Joseph, Missouri, US
- Died: 25 March 2005 (aged 79); River Falls, Wisconsin, US
- Occupation: Non-fiction writer

Academic background
- Education: University of Wisconsin–Madison

Academic work
- Discipline: History
- Sub-discipline: Second World War
- Institutions: University of Wisconsin–River Falls; Eastern Kentucky University

Edward N. Peterson (1925–2005) was an American historian and professor at the University of Wisconsin–River Falls from 1954 until his death in 2005. He earned his Ph.D. in history from the University of Wisconsin–Madison in 1953. His specialty was German history, particularly the World War II period and the German Democratic Republic, a field in which he wrote a number of books.

== Biography ==
Edward N. Peterson was born on August 28, 1925, in St. Joseph, Missouri, the son of Roscoe D. Peterson and Rachel B. (White) Peterson. Drafted into the U.S. Army on March 28, 1944, he served in the Anti-tank Platoon, 1st Battalion, 274th Infantry Regiment, of the 70th Infantry Division (United States), and was sent to Europe on December 1, 1944. He was at the Front on the Rhine River by Christmas 1944, part of the 7th and later the 3rd Armies.

After the war, he received his Ph.D. degree from the University of Wisconsin–Madison in 1953. After one year at Eastern Kentucky University in Richmond, Kentucky, he joined the faculty of Wisconsin State College, which became the University of Wisconsin–River Falls. Starting there in 1954, he taught courses in modern history until March 18, 2005—nearly 51 years. In 1963, he became Chair of the Social Science Department and then chair of the History Department until 1991.

He was also active in the German Studies Association, and was president and secretary of the Upper Midwest History Conference; Secretary & Treasurer Pierce County Historical Association. He received research grants from the Alexander von Humboldt Foundation for 1963–64, 1966, 1985; the National Endowment for the Humanities 1969–70, and the Social Science Research Council 1970–71. He supported wife Ursula's writings and publications on the History of River Falls and Pierce County, as well as her research into family history.

Peterson died on March 25, 2005, at a hospital in River Falls, Wisconsin, from complications of pneumonia and heart disease. At the time, he was "the most senior professor on campus" at UW-River Falls after having taught history for 50 years.

== Books ==
- Peterson, Edward N. (1954) Hjalmar Schacht, For and Against Hitler Boston: Christopher Publishing House, doi:10.1177/000271625429600185
- Peterson, Edward N. (1969) The Limits of Hitler's Power Princeton, N.J., Princeton University Press, 1969, ISBN 0-691-05175-5, ISBN 978-0-691-05175-8
- Peterson, Edward N. (1978) The American Occupation of Germany: Retreat to Victory Wayne State University Press; Detroit, MI; 1977; 376 p.; ISBN 0-8143-1588-7.
- Peterson, Edward N. (1990) The Many Faces of Defeat, the German People's Experience in 1945 Peter Lang Publishing, ISBN 978-0-8204-1351-8 / US-ISBN 978-0-8204-1351-8
- Peterson, Edward N. (1995) An Analytical History of World War II, Volume 1 | Volume 2 Peter Lang Publishing, ISBN 978-0-8204-2395-1 & ISBN 978-0-8204-2396-8
- Peterson, Edward N. (1998) Russian Command, German Resistance Peter Lang Publishing, ISBN 978-0-8204-3948-8
- Peterson, Edward N. (2002) The Secret Police and the Revolution: The Fall of the German Democratic Republic Praeger Publishers, ISBN 978-0-275-97328-5
- Peterson, Edward N. (2004) The Limits of Secret Police Power: The Magdeburger Stasi, 1953-1989 Peter Lang Publishing, ISBN 978-0-8204-7050-4
