= North Hall-River Falls State Normal School =

- U.S. National Register of Historic Places
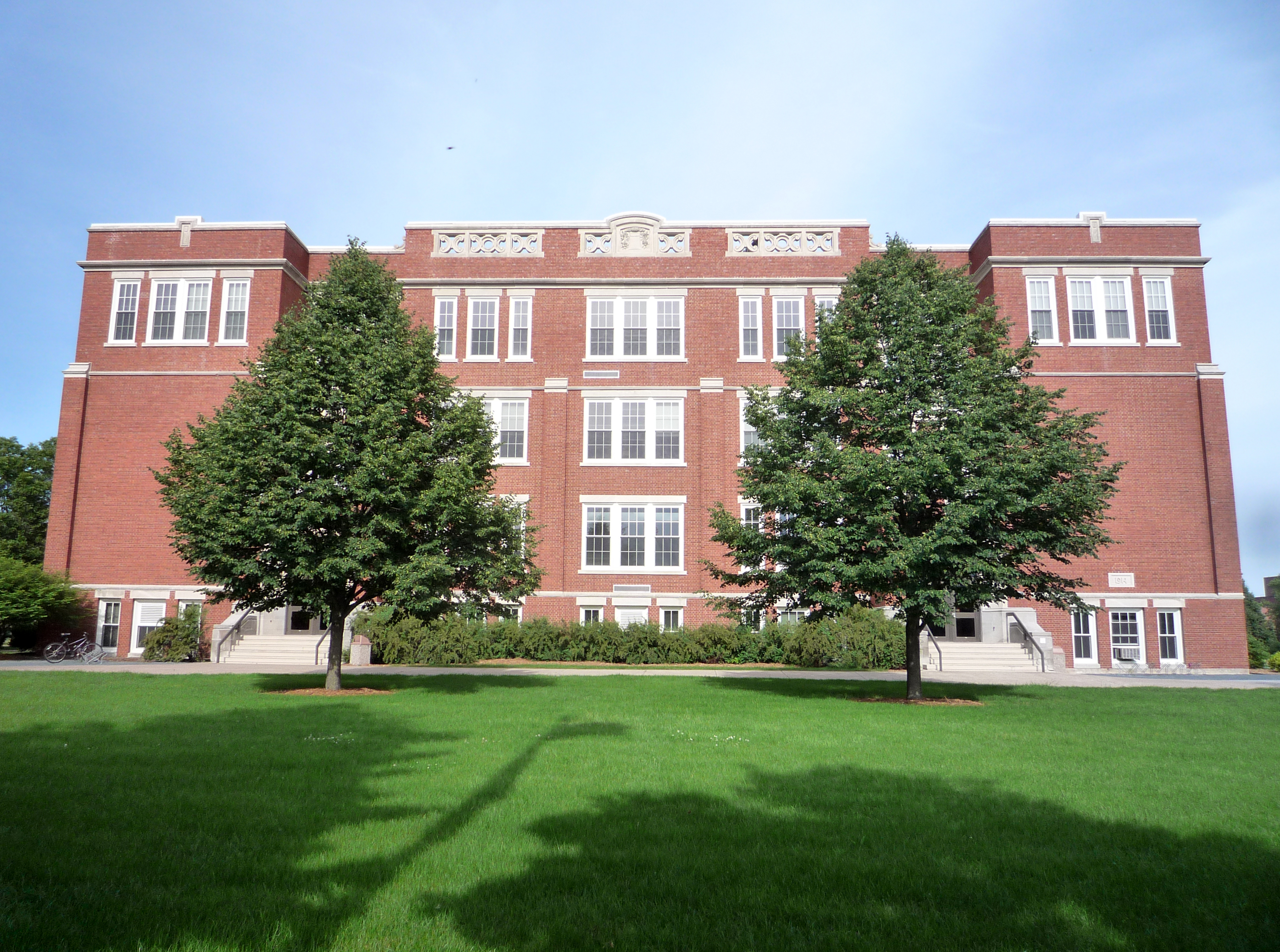
- North Hall

- Location within Wisconsin Location within the United States
- Location: River Falls, Wisconsin
- Coordinates: 44°51′17″N 92°37′23″W
- Area: 3.1 acres (1.3 ha)
- Built: 1914
- Architectural style: Collegiate Gothic
- NRHP reference No.: 86000627
- Added to NRHP: April 3, 1986

North Hall is located on the campus of what is now the University of Wisconsin-River Falls. It was added to the National Register of Historic Places in 1986.

== History ==
North Hall was built after the Wisconsin Legislature appropriated $124,000 to construct a new building for the school. Enrollment had been growing, making the existing space overcrowded. It was added onto in 1927 and began housing a four-year course for training teachers and became the State Teachers College.
