= University of Wisconsin–River Falls =

Public university in River Falls, Wisconsin, U.S.

Coordinates: 44°51′09″N 92°37′25″W

- Former names: River Falls State Normal School (1874–1927); River Falls State Teachers College (1927–1951); Wisconsin State College–River Falls (1951–1964); Wisconsin State University-River Falls (1964–1971)
- Motto: Global. Innovative. Excellent.
- Type: Public university
- Established: 1874; 152 years ago
- Parent institution: University of Wisconsin System
- Chancellor: John Chenoweth
- Students: 5,275 (2025)
- Location: River Falls, Wisconsin, United States
- Colors: Red & White
- Nickname: Falcons
- Sporting affiliations: NCAA Division III - WIAC
- Mascot: Freddy Falcon
- Website: uwrf.edu
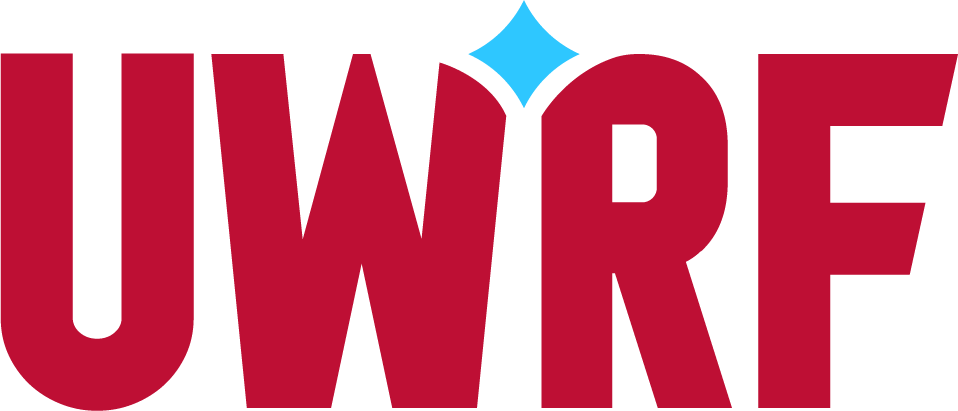

The University of Wisconsin–River Falls (UW–River Falls or UWRF) is a public university in River Falls, Wisconsin, United States. It is part of the University of Wisconsin System. The 226-acre (91 ha) campus is on the Kinnickinnic River in the St. Croix River Valley. The university has 32 major buildings and two laboratory farms, with a total of 303 acres (123 ha) of land.

In 2024–25, UWRF had an enrollment of 5,222 students in more than 70 areas of study. UWRF is a member of the American Council of Education Internationalization Laboratory and provides several global studies and study abroad programs. The university also hosts the St. Croix Institute for Sustainable Community Development.

== History ==
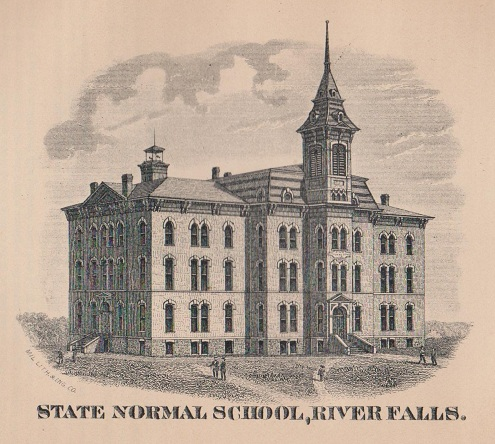
The original South Hall as it appeared before it was destroyed by fire in 1897

The University of Wisconsin–River Falls was founded in 1874 as "River Falls State Normal School", one of the state normal schools created to prepare students for teaching careers and provide better education to the state's frontier regions. In 1927, the school was renamed "River Falls State Teachers College", as the state normal schools became "State Teachers Colleges" that incorporated a significant increase in general education offerings and four-year courses of study leading to a Bachelor of Education degree.

After World War II, thousands of returning veterans in Wisconsin under the G.I. Bill needed more college choices for their studies and educational advancement. Because of popular demand, the Regents of the State Teachers College system allowed the teacher training institutions to offer bachelor's degrees in liberal arts and fine arts. In 1951, when the state teachers colleges were organized as "Wisconsin State Colleges", the school name was changed to "Wisconsin State College–River Falls", and it offered a full four-year liberal-arts curriculum. In 1964, it was renamed "Wisconsin State University-River Falls" when state colleges were all granted university status.

The school became a member of the University of Wisconsin System in 1971 when the former University of Wisconsin and the Wisconsin State University system merged. It then became the "University of Wisconsin–River Falls".

== Academics ==
UWRF offers over 70 areas of academic study, including majors, minors, and certificates. Some of these programs are accredited by specialized accreditors, including the Association to Advance Collegiate Schools of Business, National Association of Schools of Music, the Council on Social Work Education, the Association for Education in Journalism and Mass Communication, the National Association of School Psychologists, the Association to Advance Collegiate Schools of Business, the Council for Academic Accreditation in Audiology and Speech-Language Pathology (CAA), the National Council of Teachers of Mathematics, the American Chemical Society, and the American Society of Agricultural and Biosystems Engineering.

The average new freshman in 2019 had a 3.43 high school GPA and was ranked in the top 37% of their high school class.

=== Reputation and rankings ===
In 2018, University of Wisconsin–River Falls was ranked 93rd in Regional Universities Midwest, 23rd in Top Public Universities and 381st in Business Programs in United States of America. The University of Wisconsin–River Falls is one of four University of Wisconsin System institutions included in The Princeton Review's 2014 list of the "Best in the Midwest." For 2014, U.S. News & World Report ranked UWRF in the top tier for Regional Universities in the Midwest United States.

=== Sustainability ===
UWRF has a STARS rating of Gold. UWRF made Princeton Review's 2021 Guide to Green Colleges. UWRF received an A− grade on the 2011 College Sustainability Report Card. The university has created the St. Croix Institute for Sustainable Community Development, whose mission is "to support and facilitate the University of Wisconsin-River Falls in becoming one of the premier venues for deliberation and demonstration of sustainable community development principles."

== Campus ==
=== Buildings ===
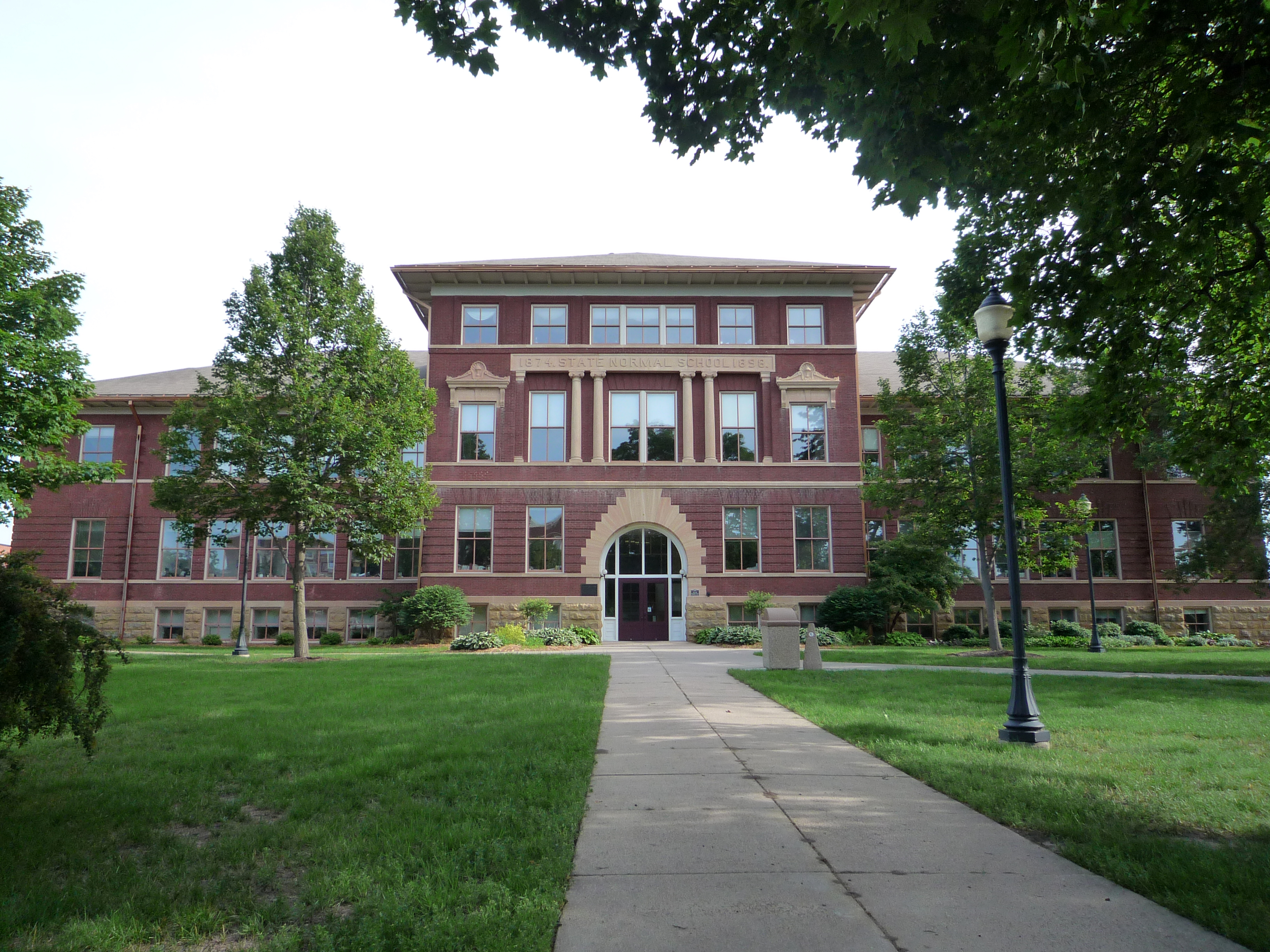
South Hall

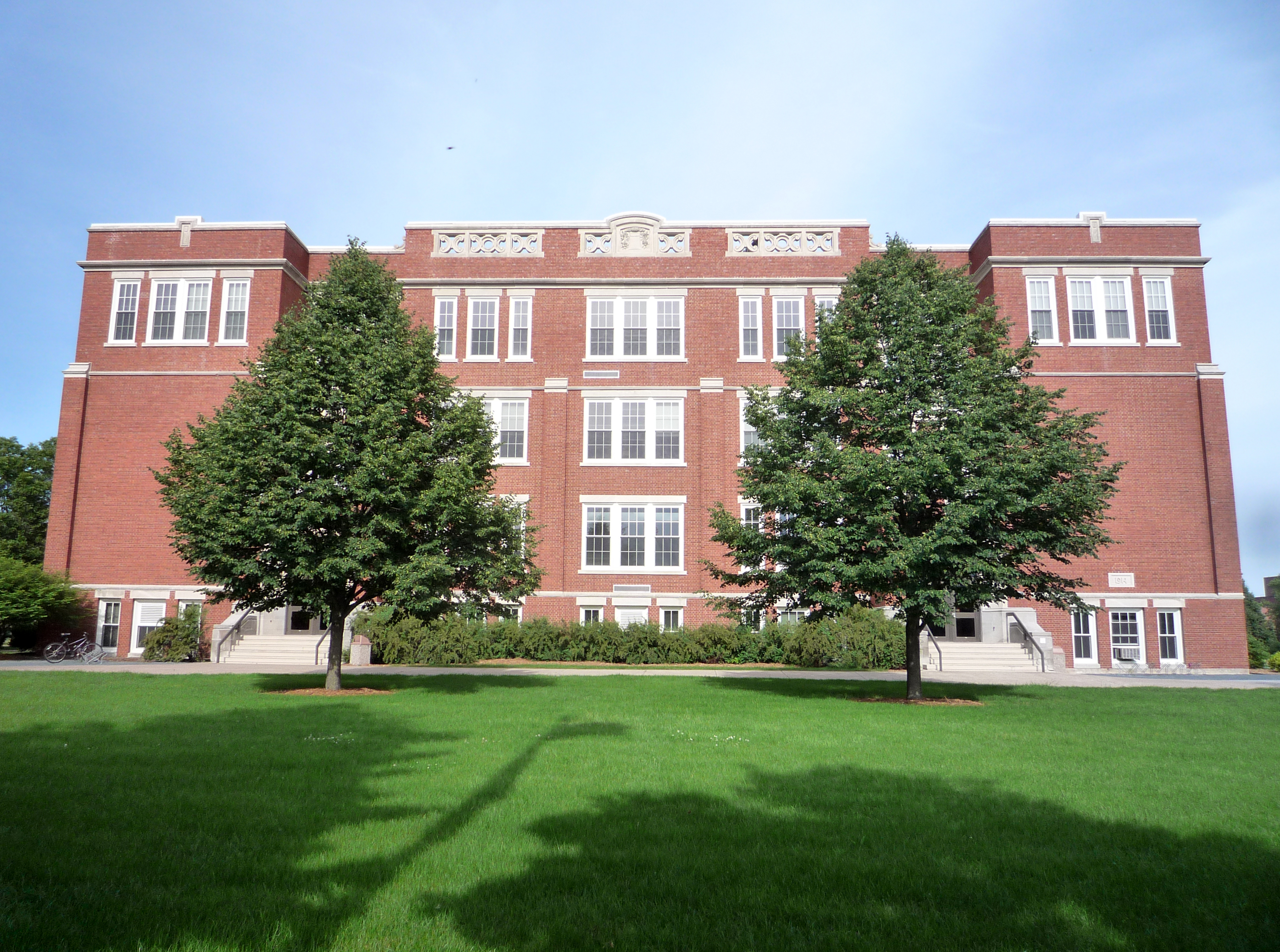
North Hall

- South Hall, built in 1898, is the oldest building on campus and is on the National Register of Historic Places.
- North Hall is the second-oldest building on campus and also on the NRHP. It was constructed in 1914.
- Chalmer Davee Library is between the Kleinpell Fine Arts building and South Hall and directly across from Hathorn Hall and the Wyman Education Building. It is the only library on campus.
- Kleinpell Fine Arts was built in 1973 and named after E. H. Kleinpell, a former university president.

== Athletics ==
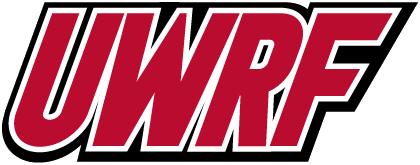
UWRF athletics mark

UW-River Falls' athletic teams, known by their nickname, the Falcons, compete in 18 varsity sports in of the Wisconsin Intercollegiate Athletic Conference in NCAA Division III. Men's sports include baseball, basketball, cross country, football, ice hockey, soccer, and track and field.

Women's sports are basketball, cross country, golf, ice hockey, lacrosse, soccer, softball, and tennis. Men's and women's hockey teams compete in the Northern Collegiate Hockey Association.

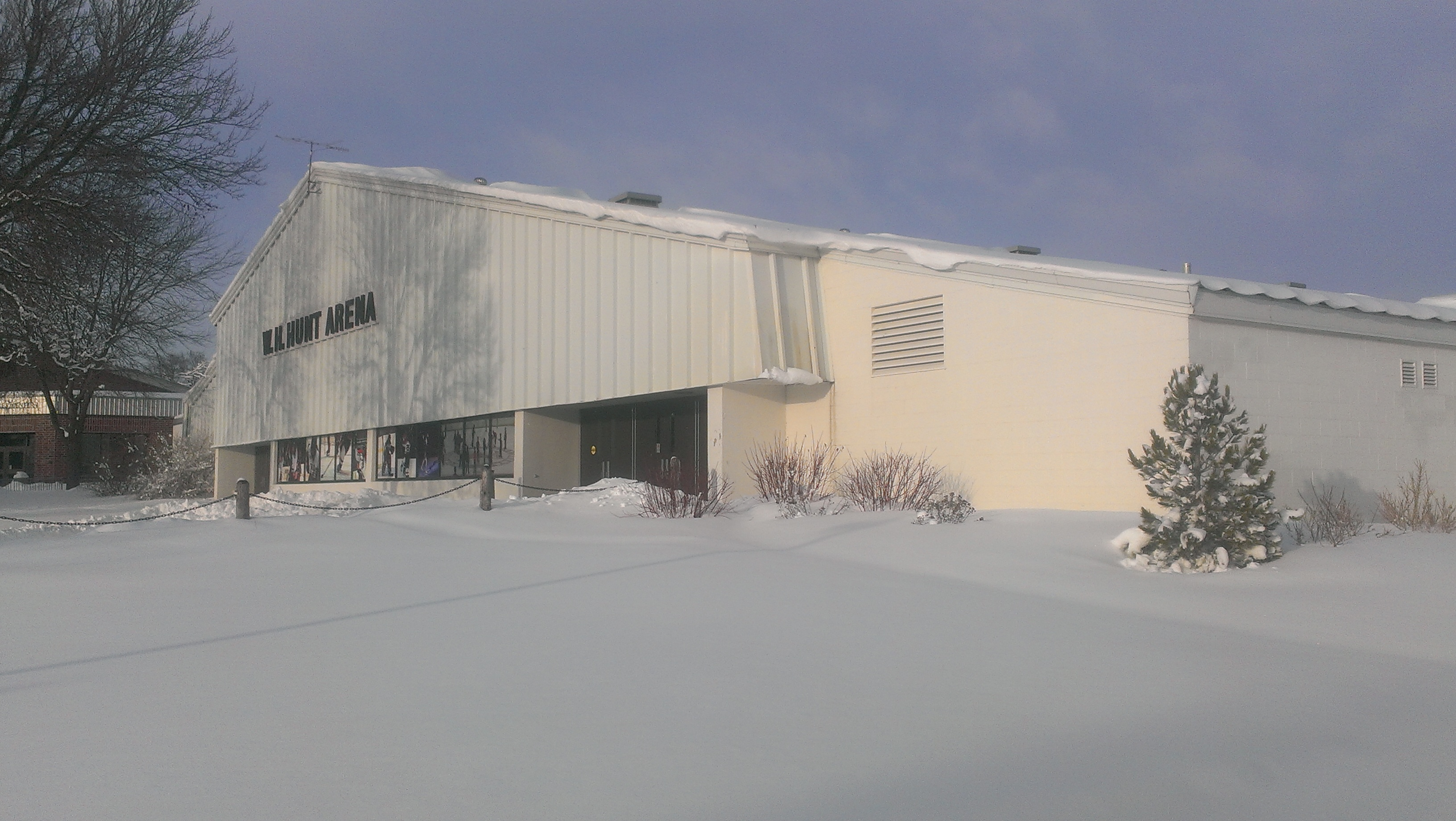
Hunt Arena, UWRF's ice hockey venue

The university also offers club sports for students, including men's volleyball, badminton, paintball, iiu jitsu, and rock climbing.

From 1991 to 2009, the Kansas City Chiefs used the university's athletic facilities during their annual summer training camp. The Chiefs moved their training camp to Missouri Western State University in St. Joseph, Missouri in 2010. In 2007, the HBO sports documentary Hard Knocks followed the Chiefs throughout their summer training camp at UWRF. The series featured a number of university buildings, including the new student union, Rodli Commons, McMillan Hall, Ramer Field Complex, Hunt Ice Hockey Arena, and Laboratory Farm #1.

== Notable faculty ==
- Osborne Cowles, basketball coach
- John Q. Emery, early university president
- Michael Norman, author
- Edward N. Peterson, historian
- Greta Gaard, ecofeminist scholar
