= History of Russia =

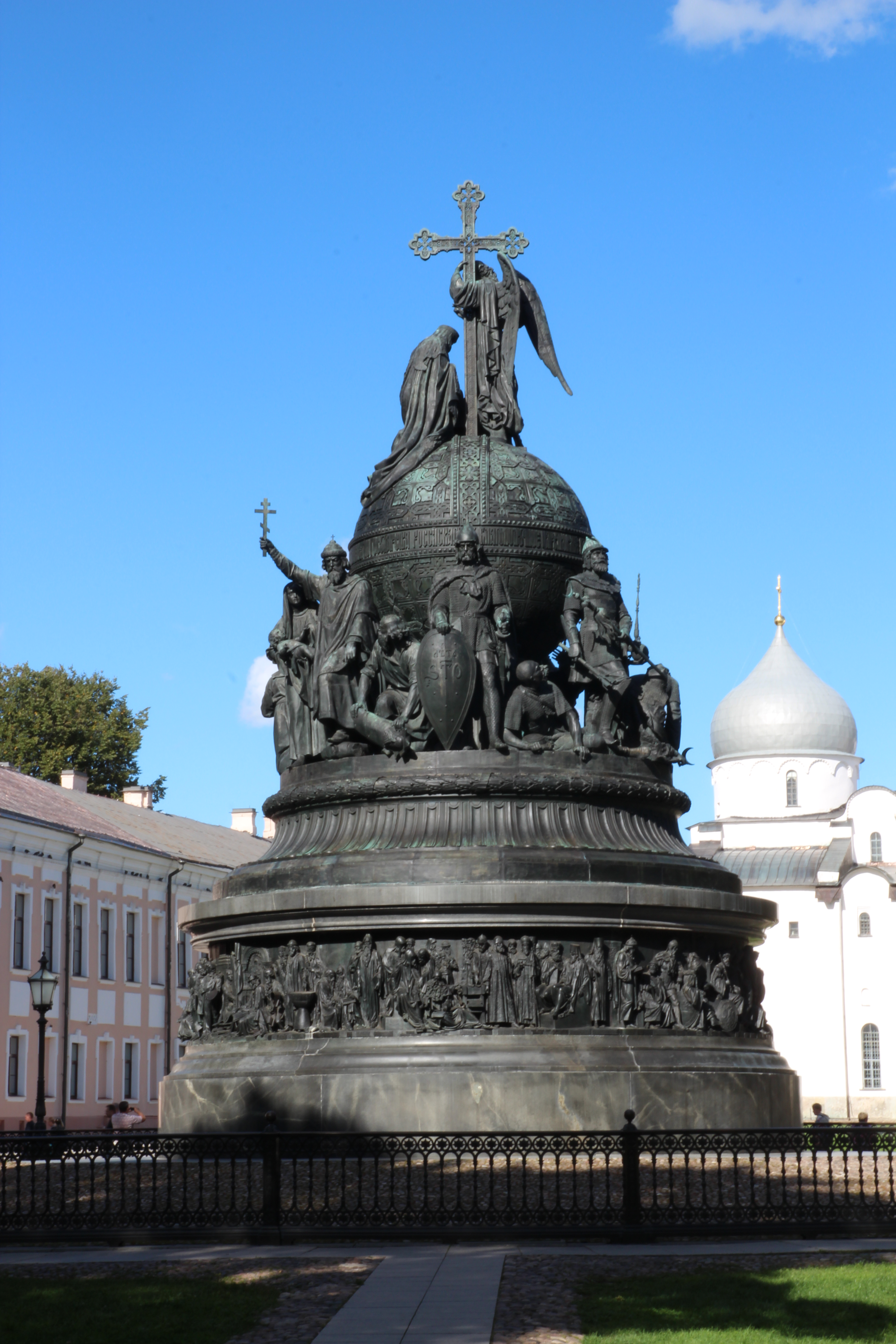
The Millennium of Russia monument in Veliky Novgorod (unveiled on 8 September 1862)

The history of Russia begins with the histories of the East Slavs. The traditional start date of specifically Russian history is the establishment of the Rus' state in the north in the year 862, ruled by Varangians. In 882, Prince Oleg of Novgorod seized Kiev, uniting the northern and southern lands of the Eastern Slavs under one authority, moving the governance center to Kiev by the end of the 10th century, and maintaining northern and southern parts with significant autonomy from each other. The state adopted Christianity from the Byzantine Empire in 988, beginning the synthesis of Byzantine, Slavic and Scandinavian cultures that defined Russian culture for the next millennium. Kievan Rus' ultimately disintegrated as a state due to the Mongol invasions in 1237–1240. After the 13th century, Moscow emerged as a significant political and cultural force, driving the gathering of Russian territories. By the end of the 15th century, many of the petty principalities around Moscow had been united with the Grand Duchy of Moscow, which took full control of its own sovereignty under Ivan the Great.

Ivan the Terrible transformed the Grand Duchy into the Tsardom of Russia in 1547. However, the death of Ivan's son Feodor I without issue in 1598 created a succession crisis and led Russia into a period of chaos and civil war known as the Time of Troubles, ending with the coronation of Michael Romanov as the first Tsar of the Romanov dynasty in 1613. During the rest of the seventeenth century, Russia completed the exploration and conquest of Siberia, claiming lands as far as the Pacific Ocean by the end of the century. Domestically, Russia faced numerous uprisings of the various ethnic groups under their control, as exemplified by the Cossack leader Stenka Razin, who led a revolt in 1670–1671. In 1721, in the wake of the Great Northern War, Tsar Peter the Great renamed the state as the Russian Empire; he is also noted for establishing St. Petersburg as the new capital of his Empire, and for his introducing Western European culture to Russia. In 1762, Russia came under the control of Catherine the Great, who continued the westernizing policies of Peter the Great, and ushered in the era of the Russian Enlightenment. Catherine's grandson, Alexander I, repulsed an invasion by the French Emperor Napoleon, leading Russia into the status of one of the great powers.

Peasant revolts intensified during the nineteenth century, culminating with Alexander II abolishing Russian serfdom in 1861. In the following decades, reform efforts such as the Stolypin reforms of 1906–1914, the constitution of 1906, and the State Duma (1906–1917) attempted to open and liberalize the economy and political system, but the emperors refused to relinquish autocratic rule and resisted sharing their power. A combination of economic breakdown, mismanagement over Russia's involvement in World War I, and discontent with the autocratic system of government triggered the Russian Revolution in 1917. The end of the monarchy initially brought into office a coalition of liberals and moderate socialists, but their failed policies led to the October Revolution. In 1922, Soviet Russia, along with the Ukrainian SSR, Byelorussian SSR, and Transcaucasian SFSR signed the Treaty on the Creation of the USSR, officially merging all four republics to form the Soviet Union as a single state. Between 1922 and 1991 the history of Russia essentially became the history of the Soviet Union. During this period, the Soviet Union was one of the victors in World War II after recovering from a surprise invasion in 1941 by Nazi Germany and its collaborators, which had previously signed a non-aggression pact with the Soviet Union. The Soviet Union's network of satellite states in Eastern Europe, which were brought into its sphere of influence in the closing stages of World War II, helped the country become a superpower competing with fellow superpower the United States and other Western countries in the Cold War.

By the mid-1980s, with the weaknesses of Soviet economic and political structures becoming acute, Mikhail Gorbachev embarked on major reforms, which eventually led to the weakening of the communist party and dissolution of the Soviet Union, leaving Russia again on its own and marking the start of the history of post-Soviet Russia. The Russian Soviet Federative Socialist Republic renamed itself as the Russian Federation and became the primary successor state to the Soviet Union. Russia retained its nuclear arsenal but lost its superpower status. Scrapping the central planning and state-ownership of property of the Soviet era in the 1990s, new leaders, led by President Vladimir Putin, took political and economic power after 2000 and engaged in an assertive foreign policy. Coupled with economic growth, Russia has since regained significant global status as a world power. Russia's 2014 annexation of the Crimean Peninsula led to economic sanctions imposed by the United States and the European Union. Russia's 2022 invasion of Ukraine led to significantly expanded sanctions. Under Putin's leadership, corruption in Russia is rated as the worst in Europe, and Russia's human rights situation has been increasingly criticized by international observers.

== Prehistory ==
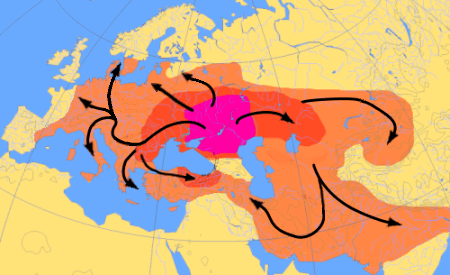
The Kurgan hypothesis: South Russia as the urheimat of Indo-European peoples

The first human settlement on the territory of Russia dates back to the Oldowan period in the early Lower Paleolithic. About 2 million years ago, representatives of Homo erectus migrated from Western Asia to the North Caucasus (archaeological site of Kermek on the Taman Peninsula). At Bogatyri/Sinyaya balka, in a skull of Elasmotherium caucasicum, which lived 1.5–1.2 million years ago, a stone tool was found. 1.5-million-year-old Oldowan flint tools have been discovered in the Dagestan Akusha region of the north Caucasus, demonstrating the presence of early humans in the territory of present-day Russia.

Fossils of Denisovans in Russia date to about 110,000 years ago. DNA from a bone fragment found in Denisova Cave, belonging to a female who died about 90,000 years ago, shows that she was a hybrid of a Neanderthal mother and a Denisovan father. Russia was also home to some of the last surviving Neanderthals - the partial skeleton of a Neanderthal infant in Mezmaiskaya cave in Adygea showed a carbon-dated age of only 45,000 years. In 2008, Russian archaeologists from the Institute of Archaeology and Ethnology of Novosibirsk, working at the site of Denisova Cave in the Altai Mountains of Siberia, uncovered a 40,000-year-old small bone fragment from the fifth finger of a juvenile hominin, which DNA analysis revealed to be a previously unknown species of human, which was named the Denisova hominin.

The first trace of Homo sapiens on the large expanse of Russian territory dates back to 45,000 years, in central Siberia (Ust'-Ishim man). The discovery of some of the earliest evidence for the presence of anatomically modern humans found anywhere in Europe was reported in 2007 from the Kostenki archaeological site near the Don River in Russia (dated to at least 40,000 years ago) and at Sungir (34,600 years ago). Humans reached Arctic Russia (Mamontovaya Kurya) by 40,000 years ago. Around the same time, it is believed that Paleo-Indians, the ancestors of the Indigenous peoples of the Americas, made their journey across a land bridge, Beringia, which is now the Bering Strait on the Chukchi Peninsula.

During the prehistoric eras the vast steppes of Southern Russia were home to tribes of nomadic pastoralists. (In classical antiquity, the Pontic Steppe was known as "Scythia".) Remnants of these long-gone steppe cultures were discovered in the course of the 20th century in such places as Ipatovo, Sintashta, Arkaim, and Pazyryk.

== Antiquity ==
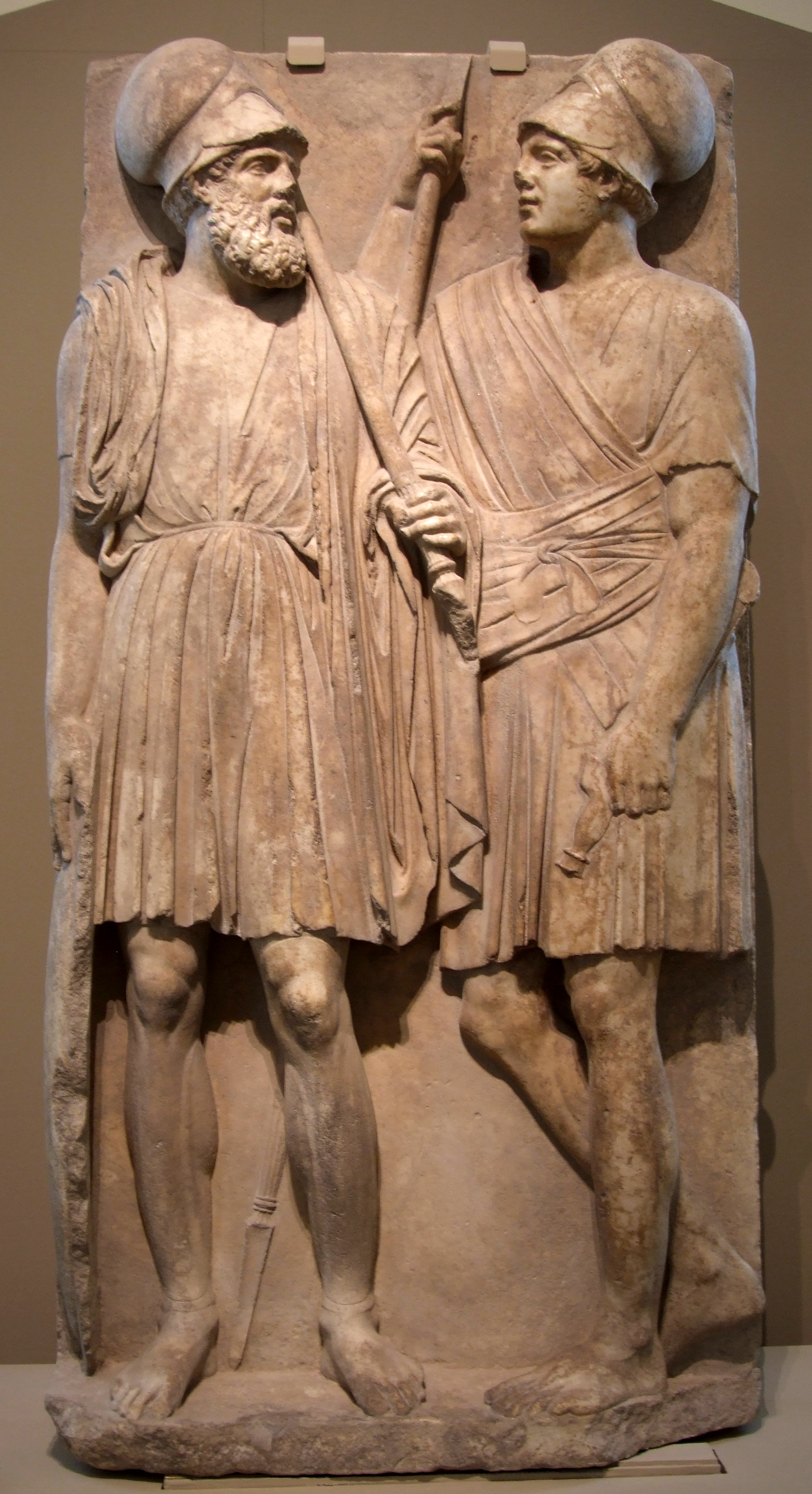
Stele with two Hellenistic soldiers of the Bosporan Kingdom; from Taman Peninsula (Yubileynoe), southern Russia, 3rd quarter of the 4th century BC; marble, Pushkin Museum

In the later part of the 8th century BC, Greek merchants brought classical civilization to the trade emporiums in Tanais and Phanagoria. Gelonus was described by Herodotus as a huge (Europe's biggest) earth- and wood-fortified grad inhabited around 500 BC by Heloni and Budini. In 513 BC, the king of the Achaemenid Empire, Darius I, launched a military campaign around the Black Sea into Scythia, modern-day Ukraine, eventually reaching the Tanais river (now known as the Don).

Greeks, mostly from the city-state of Miletus, would colonize large parts of modern-day Crimea and the Sea of Azov during the seventh and sixth centuries BC, eventually unifying into the Bosporan Kingdom by 480 BC, and would be incorporated into the large Kingdom of Pontus in 107 BC. The Kingdom would eventually be conquered by the Roman Republic, and the Bosporan Kingdom would become a client state of the Roman Empire. At about the 2nd century AD Goths migrated to the Black Sea, and in the 3rd and 4th centuries AD, a semi-legendary Gothic kingdom of Oium existed in Southern Russia until it was overrun by Huns. Between the 3rd and 6th centuries AD, the Bosporan Kingdom was also overwhelmed by successive waves of nomadic invasions, led by warlike tribes which would often move on to Europe, as was the case with the Huns and Turkish Avars.

In the second millennium BC, the territories between the Kama and the Irtysh Rivers were the home of a Proto-Uralic-speaking population that had contacts with Proto-Indo-European speakers from the south. The woodland population is the ancestor of the modern Ugrian inhabitants of Trans-Uralia. Other researchers say that the Khanty people originated in the south Ural steppe and moved northwards into their current location about 500 AD.

A Turkic people, the Khazars, ruled the lower Volga basin steppes between the Caspian and Black Seas through to the 8th century. Noted for their laws, tolerance, and cosmopolitanism, the Khazars were the main commercial link between the Baltic and the Muslim Abbasid empire centered in Baghdad. They were important allies of the Eastern Roman Empire, and waged a series of successful wars against the Arab Caliphates.

== Early history ==
=== Early Slavs ===
Some of the ancestors of the modern Russians were the Slavic tribes, whose original home is thought by some scholars to have been the Pripet Marshes. The Early East Slavs gradually settled Western Russia in two waves: one moving from Kiev (present-day Ukraine) towards present-day Suzdal and Murom and another from Polotsk (present-day Belarus) towards Novgorod and Rostov.

From the 7th century onwards, East Slavs constituted the bulk of the population in Western Russia and slowly conquered and assimilated the native Finnic and Baltic tribes, such as the Merya, the Muromians, and the Meshchera.

There existed a political hierarchy north of the middle Dnieper as early as 825-850, and perhaps even earlier. Indeed, according to the Annales Bertiniani, some Rhōs (as they were known by the Byzantines) accompanied a Byzantine embassy to the court of the Frankish king, Louis the Pious, asking assistance in returning to their homeland. Their ruler was ascribed a title akin to the Khazars' (Chaganus; Khagan), but they yet claimed belonging to the 'people of the Swedes'. The specific facts related to this political hierarchy, however, are subject to numerous contradicting historical interpretations.

=== Kievan Rus' (862–1240) ===
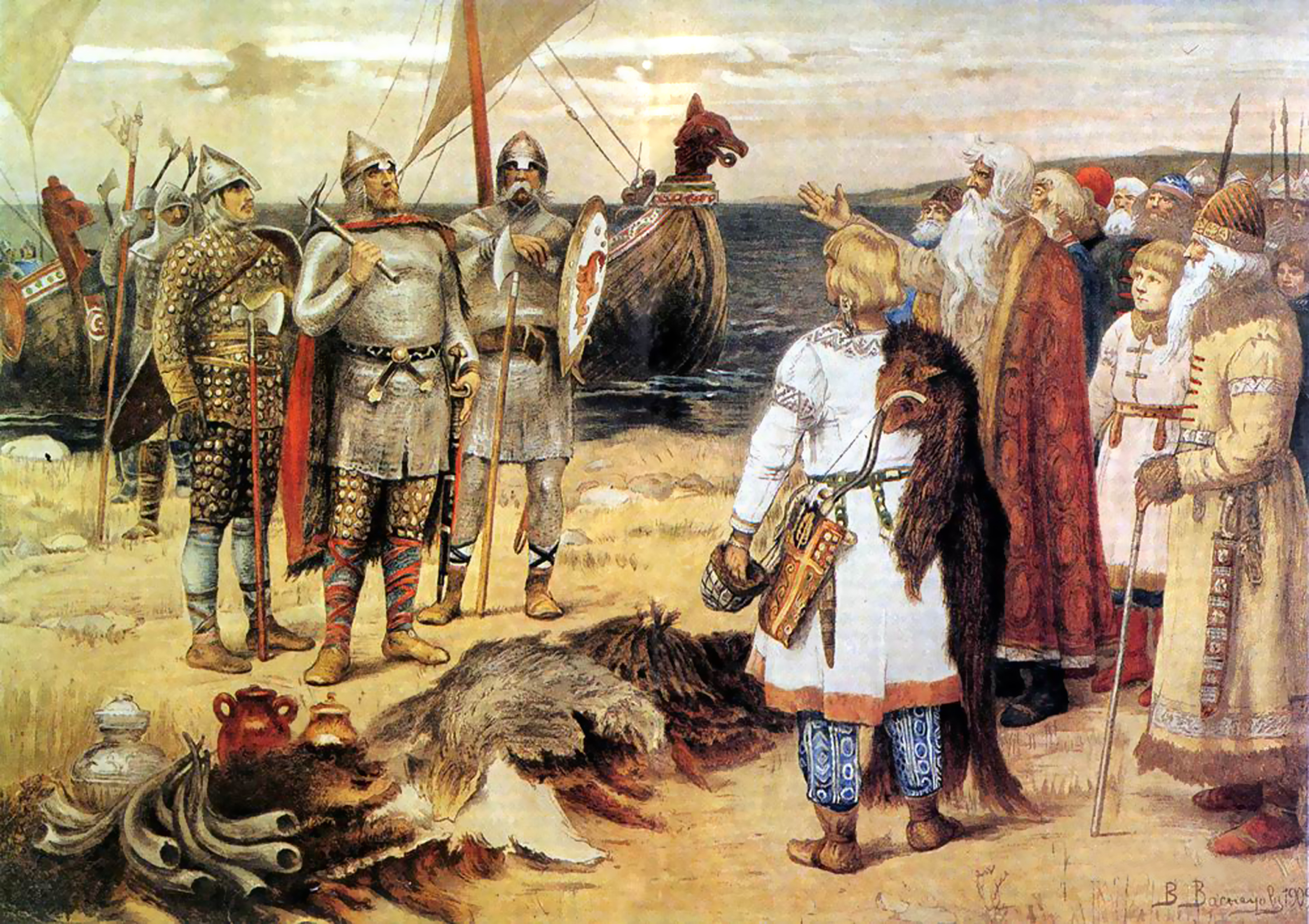
Calling of the Varangians by Viktor Vasnetsov

Scandinavian Norsemen, known as Vikings in Western Europe and Varangians in the East, combined piracy and trade throughout Northern Europe. In the mid-9th century, they began to venture along the waterways from the eastern Baltic to the Black and Caspian Seas. According to the legendary Calling of the Varangians, recorded in several Rus' chronicles such as the Novgorod First Chronicle and Primary Chronicle, the Varangians Rurik, Sineus and Truvor were invited in the 860s to restore order in three towns – either Novgorod (most texts) or Staraya Ladoga (Hypatian Codex); Beloozero; and Izborsk (most texts) or "Slovensk" (Pskov Third Chronicle), respectively. Their successors allegedly moved south and extended their authority to Kiev, which had been previously dominated by the Khazars.

Thus, the first East Slavic state, Rus', emerged in the 9th century along the Dnieper River valley. A coordinated group of princely states with a common interest in maintaining trade along the river routes, Kievan Rus' controlled the trade route for furs, wax, and slaves between Scandinavia and the Byzantine Empire along the Volkhov and Dnieper Rivers.

By the end of the 10th century, the minority Norse military aristocracy had merged with the native Slavic population, which also absorbed Greek Christian influences in the course of the multiple campaigns to loot Tsargrad, or Constantinople. One such campaign claimed the life of the foremost Slavic druzhina leader, Svyatoslav I, who was renowned for having crushed the power of the Khazars on the Volga.

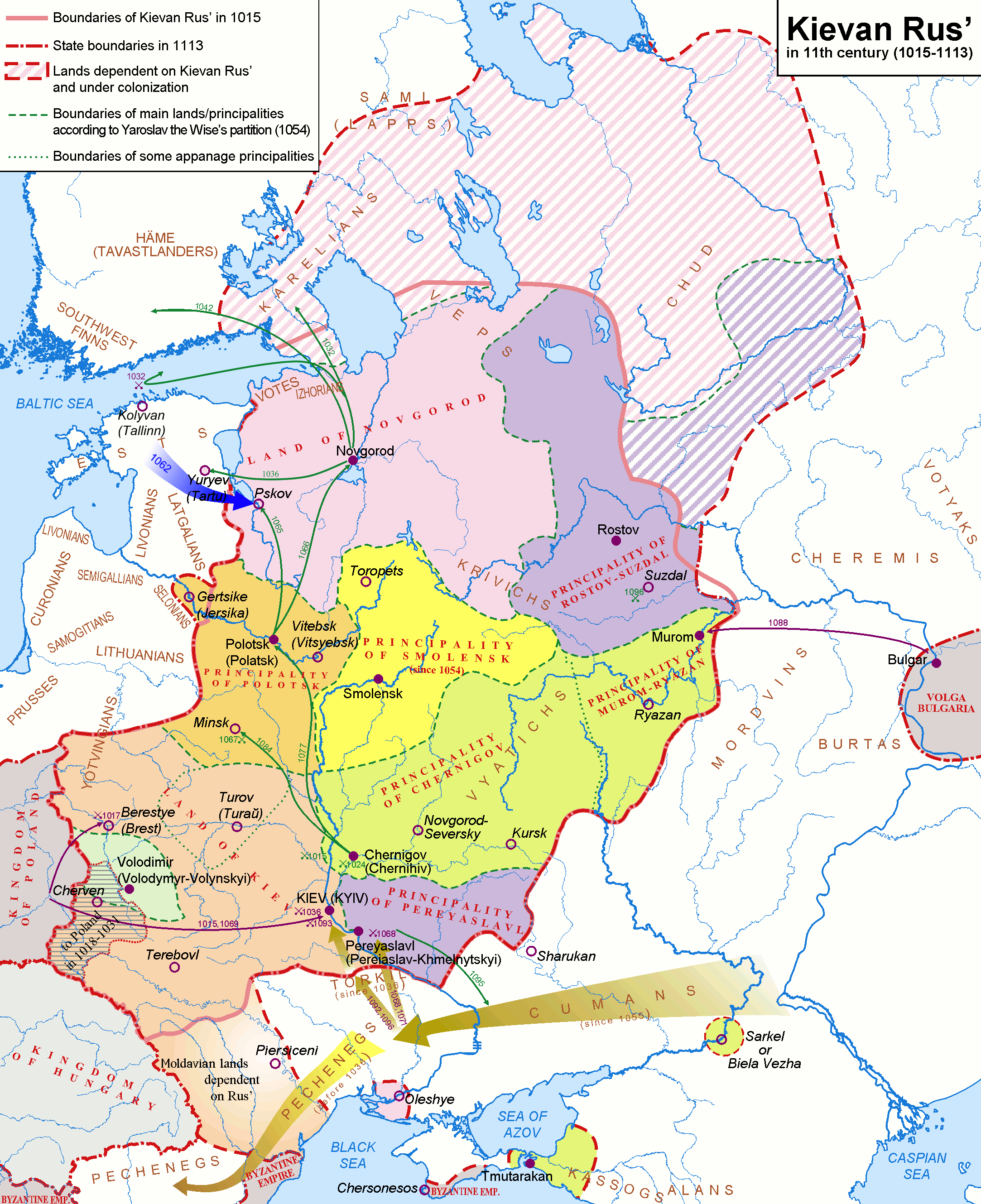
Kievan Rus' after the Council of Liubech in 1097

Kievan Rus' is important for its introduction of a Slavic variant of the Eastern Orthodox religion, dramatically deepening a synthesis of Byzantine and Slavic cultures that defined Russian culture for the next thousand years. The region adopted Christianity in 988 by the official act of public baptism of Kiev inhabitants by Prince Vladimir I. Some years later the first code of laws, Russkaya Pravda, was introduced by Yaroslav the Wise. From the onset, the Kievan princes followed the Byzantine example and kept the Church dependent on them.

By the 11th century, particularly during the reign of Yaroslav the Wise, Kievan Rus' displayed an economy and achievements in architecture and literature superior to those that then existed in the western part of the continent. Compared with the languages of European Christendom, the Russian language was little influenced by the Greek and Latin of early Christian writings. This was because Church Slavonic was used directly in liturgy instead. A nomadic Turkic people, the Kipchaks (also known as the Cumans), replaced the earlier Pechenegs as the dominant force in the south steppe regions neighbouring to Rus' at the end of the 11th century and founded a nomadic state in the steppes along the Black Sea (Desht-e-Kipchak). Repelling their regular attacks, especially in Kiev, was a heavy burden for the southern areas of Rus'. The nomadic incursions caused a massive influx of Slavs to the safer, heavily forested regions of the north, particularly to the area known as Zalesye.

Kievan Rus' ultimately disintegrated as a state because of in-fighting between members of the princely family that ruled it collectively. Kiev's dominance waned, to the benefit of Vladimir-Suzdal in the north-east, Novgorod in the north, and Halych-Volhynia in the south-west. Conquest by the Mongol Golden Horde in the 13th century was the final blow. Kiev was destroyed. Halych-Volhynia would eventually be absorbed into the Polish–Lithuanian Commonwealth, while the Mongol-dominated Vladimir-Suzdal and independent Novgorod Republic, two regions on the periphery of Kiev, would establish the basis for the modern Russian nation.

=== Mongol invasion and vassalage (1223–1480) ===
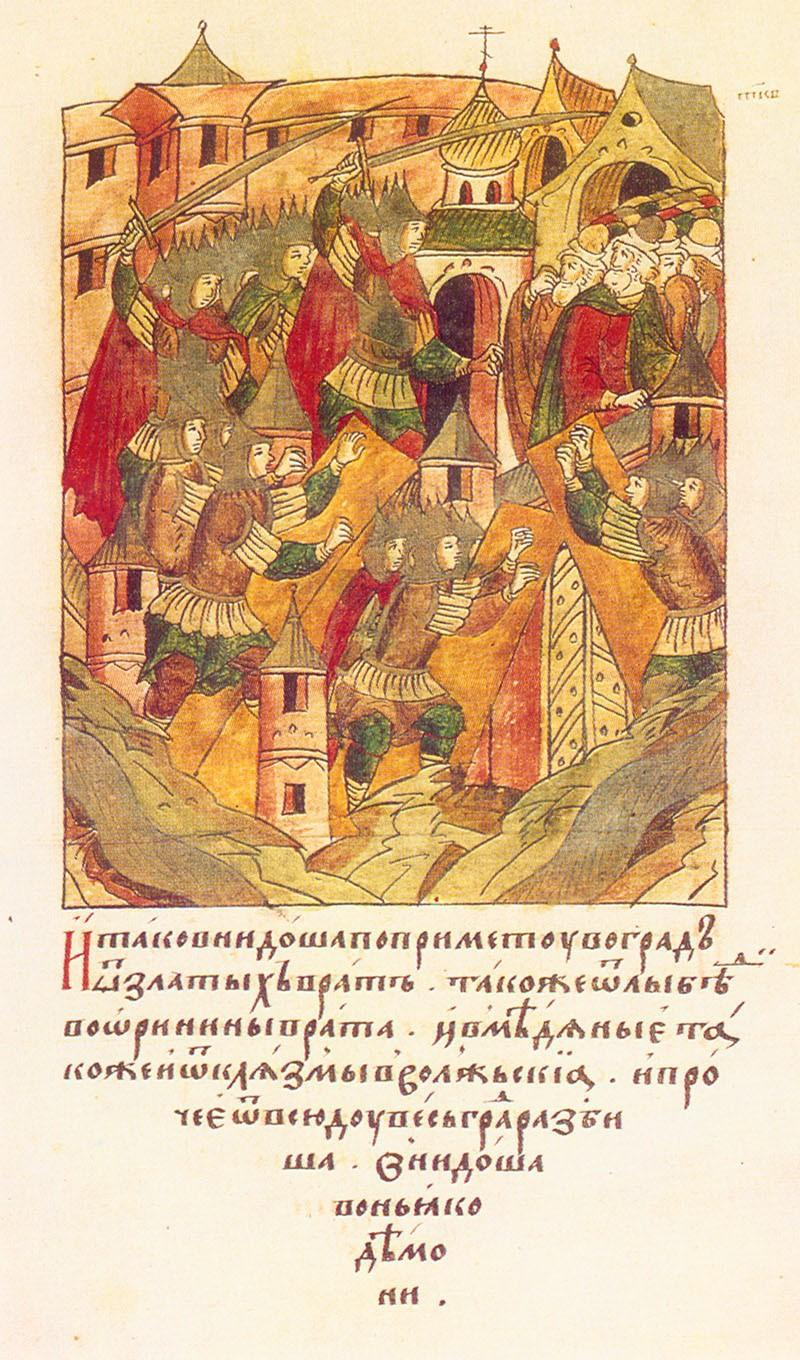
The sacking of Vladimir by Batu Khan in February 1238

The invading Mongols accelerated the fragmentation of the Rus'. In 1223, the disunited southern princes faced a Mongol raiding party at the Kalka River and were soundly defeated. In 1237–1238 the Mongols burnt down the city of Vladimir (4 February 1238) and other major cities of northeast Russia, routed the Russians at the Sit' River, and then moved west into Poland and Hungary. By then they had conquered most of the Russian principalities. Only the Novgorod Republic escaped occupation and continued to flourish in the orbit of the Hanseatic League.

The impact of the Mongol invasion on the territories of Kievan Rus' was uneven. The advanced city culture was almost completely destroyed. As older centers such as Kiev and Vladimir never recovered from the devastation of the initial attack, the new cities of Moscow, Tver and Nizhny Novgorod began to compete for hegemony in the Mongol-dominated Rus' principalities under the suzerainty of the Golden Horde. Although a coalition of Rus' princes led by Dmitry Donskoy defeated Mongol warlord Mamai at Kulikovo in 1380, forces of the new khan Tokhtamysh and his Rus' allies immediately sacked Moscow in 1382 as punishment for resisting Mongol authority. Mongol domination of the Rus' principalities, along with tax collection by various overlords such as the Crimean Khans, continued into the early 16th century, despite later claims of Muscovite bookmen that the indecisive standoff at the Ugra in 1480 had signified "the end of the Tatar yoke" and the "liberation of Russia".

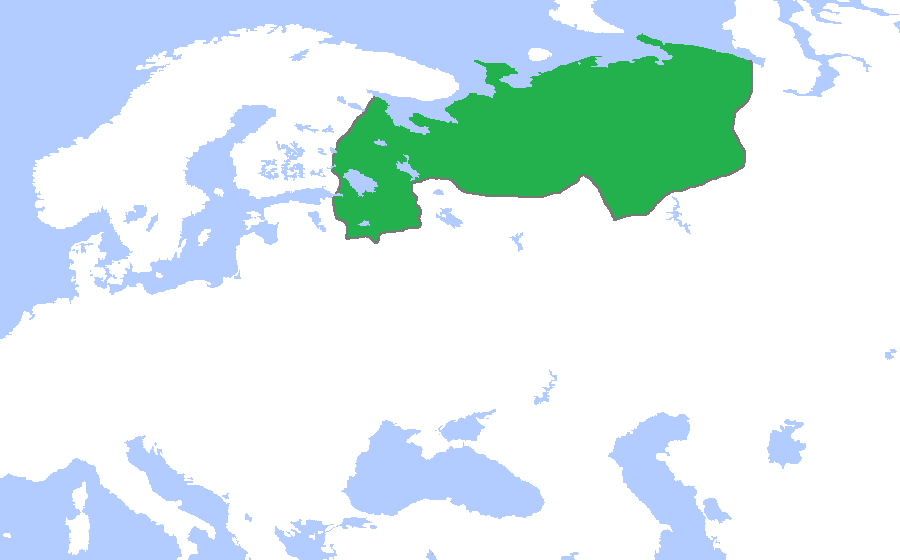
The Novgorod Republic c. 1400. Novgorod created a vast territorial empire and controlled much of the fur trade with Europe. The city was one of the main trading posts of the Hanseatic League.

The Mongols dominated the lower reaches of the Volga and held Russia in sway from their western capital at Sarai, one of the largest cities of the medieval world. The princes had to pay tribute to the Mongols of the Golden Horde, commonly called Tatars; but in return they received charters authorizing them to act as deputies to the khans. In general, the princes were allowed considerable freedom to rule as they wished, while the Russian Orthodox Church even experienced a spiritual revival.

The Mongols left their impact on the Russians in such areas as military tactics and transportation. Under Mongol occupation, Muscovy also developed its postal road network, census, fiscal system, and military organization.

At the same time, Prince of Novgorod, Alexander Nevsky, managed to repel the offensive of the Northern Crusades against Novgorod from the West. Despite this, becoming the Grand Prince, Alexander declared himself a vassal to the Golden Horde, not having the strength to resist its power.

== Grand Duchy of Moscow (1283–1547) ==
=== Rise of Moscow ===
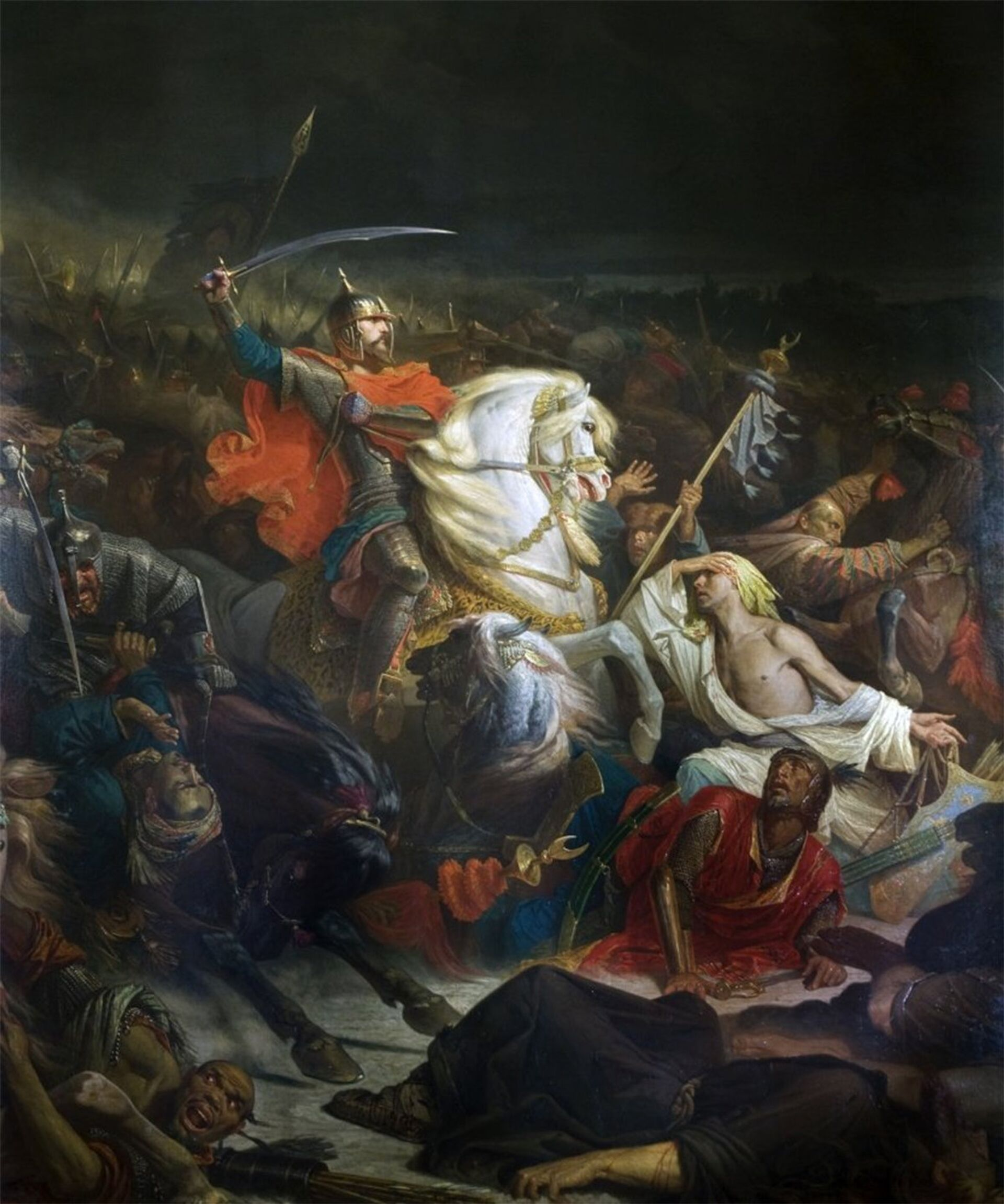
Dmitry Donskoy in the Battle of Kulikovo

Daniil Aleksandrovich, the youngest son of Alexander Nevsky, founded the principality of Moscow (known as Muscovy in English), which first cooperated with and ultimately expelled the Tatars from Russia. Well-situated in the central river system of Russia and surrounded by protective forests and marshes, Moscow was at first only a vassal of Vladimir, but soon it absorbed its parent state.

A major factor in the ascendancy of Moscow was the cooperation of its rulers with the Mongol overlords, who granted them the title of Grand Prince of Moscow and made them agents for collecting the Tatar tribute from the Russian principalities. The principality's prestige was further enhanced when it became the center of the Russian Orthodox Church. Its head, the Metropolitan, fled from Kiev to Vladimir in 1299 and a few years later established the permanent headquarters of the Church in Moscow under the original title of Kiev Metropolitan.

By the middle of the 14th century, the power of the Mongols was declining, and the Grand Princes felt able to openly oppose the Mongol yoke. In 1380, at Battle of Kulikovo on the Don River, the Mongols were defeated, and although this hard-fought victory did not end Tatar rule of Russia, it did bring great fame to the Grand Prince Dmitry Donskoy. Moscow's leadership in Russia was now firmly based and by the middle of the 14th century its territory had greatly expanded through purchase, war, and marriage.

=== Ivan III, the Great ===
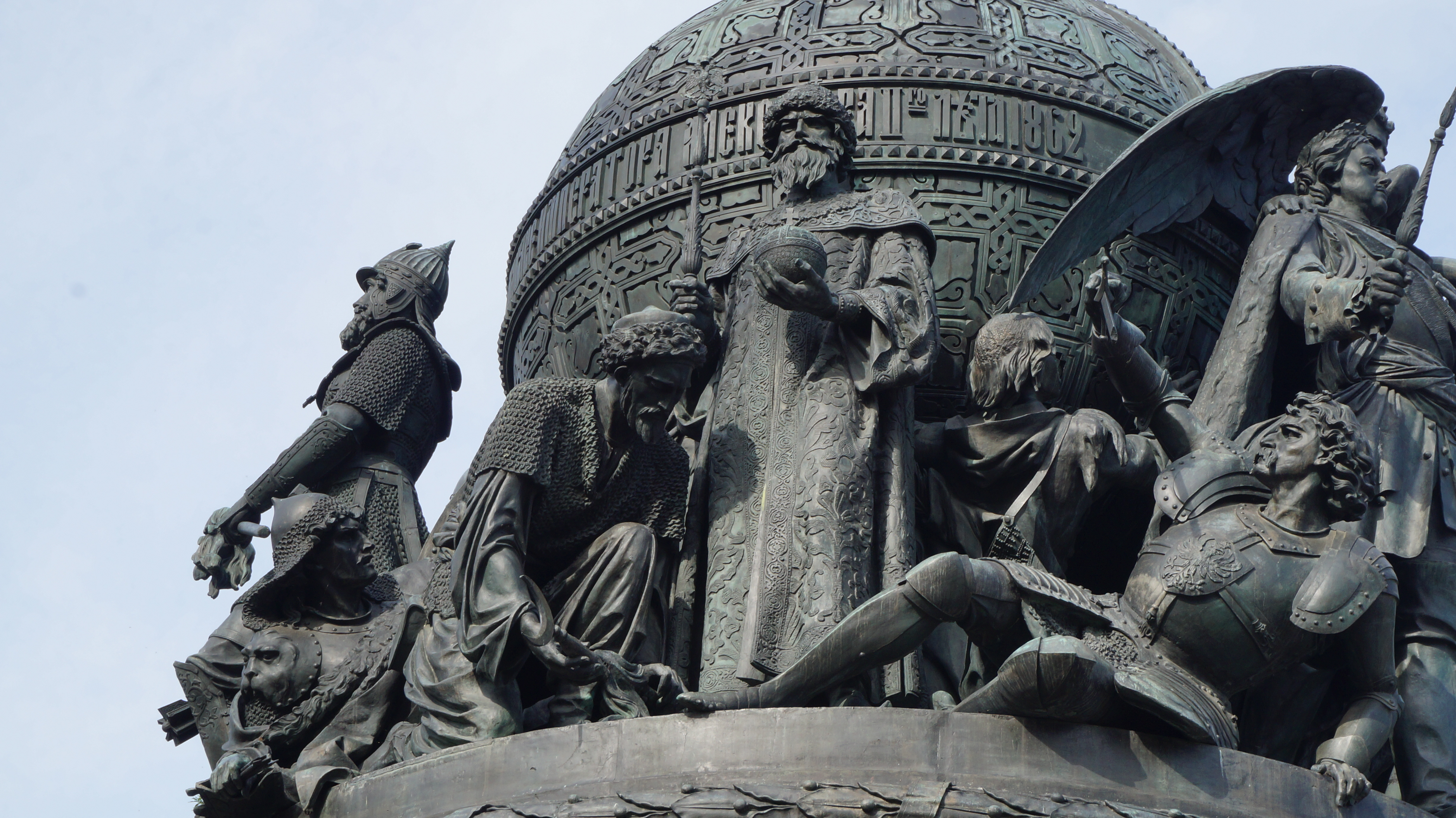
Ivan III of Russia at the Millennium of Russia. At his feet, defeated: Tatar, Lithuanian and Baltic German.

In the 15th century, the grand princes of Moscow continued to consolidate Russian land to increase their population and wealth. The most successful practitioner of this process was Ivan III, who laid the foundations for a Russian national state. Ivan competed with his powerful northwestern rival, the Grand Duchy of Lithuania, for control over some of the semi-independent Upper Principalities in the upper Dnieper and Oka River basins.

Through the defections of some princes, border skirmishes, and a long war with the Novgorod Republic, Ivan III was able to annex Novgorod and Tver. As a result, the Grand Duchy of Moscow tripled in size under his rule. During his conflict with Pskov, a monk named Filofei (Philotheus of Pskov) composed a letter to Ivan III, with the prophecy that the latter's kingdom would be the Third Rome. The Fall of Constantinople and the death of the last Greek Orthodox Christian emperor contributed to this new idea of Moscow as New Rome and the seat of Orthodox Christianity, as did Ivan's 1472 marriage to Byzantine Princess Sophia Palaiologina.

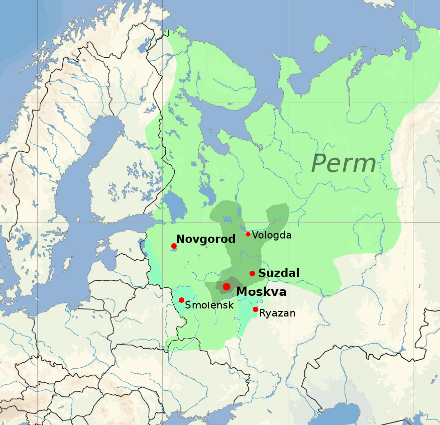
Grand Duchy of Moscow (Territorial expansion between 1300 and 1547)

Under Ivan III, the first central government bodies were created in Russia: Prikaz. The Sudebnik was adopted, the first set of laws since the 11th century. The double-headed eagle was adopted as the coat of arms of Russia.

Ivan proclaimed his absolute sovereignty over all Russian princes and nobles. Refusing further tribute to the Tatars, Ivan initiated a series of attacks that opened the way for the complete defeat of the declining Golden Horde, now divided into several Khanates and hordes. Ivan and his successors sought to protect the southern boundaries of their domain against attacks of the Crimean Tatars and other hordes. To achieve this aim, they sponsored the construction of the Great Abatis Belt and granted manors to nobles, who were obliged to serve in the military. The manor system provided a basis for an emerging cavalry-based army.

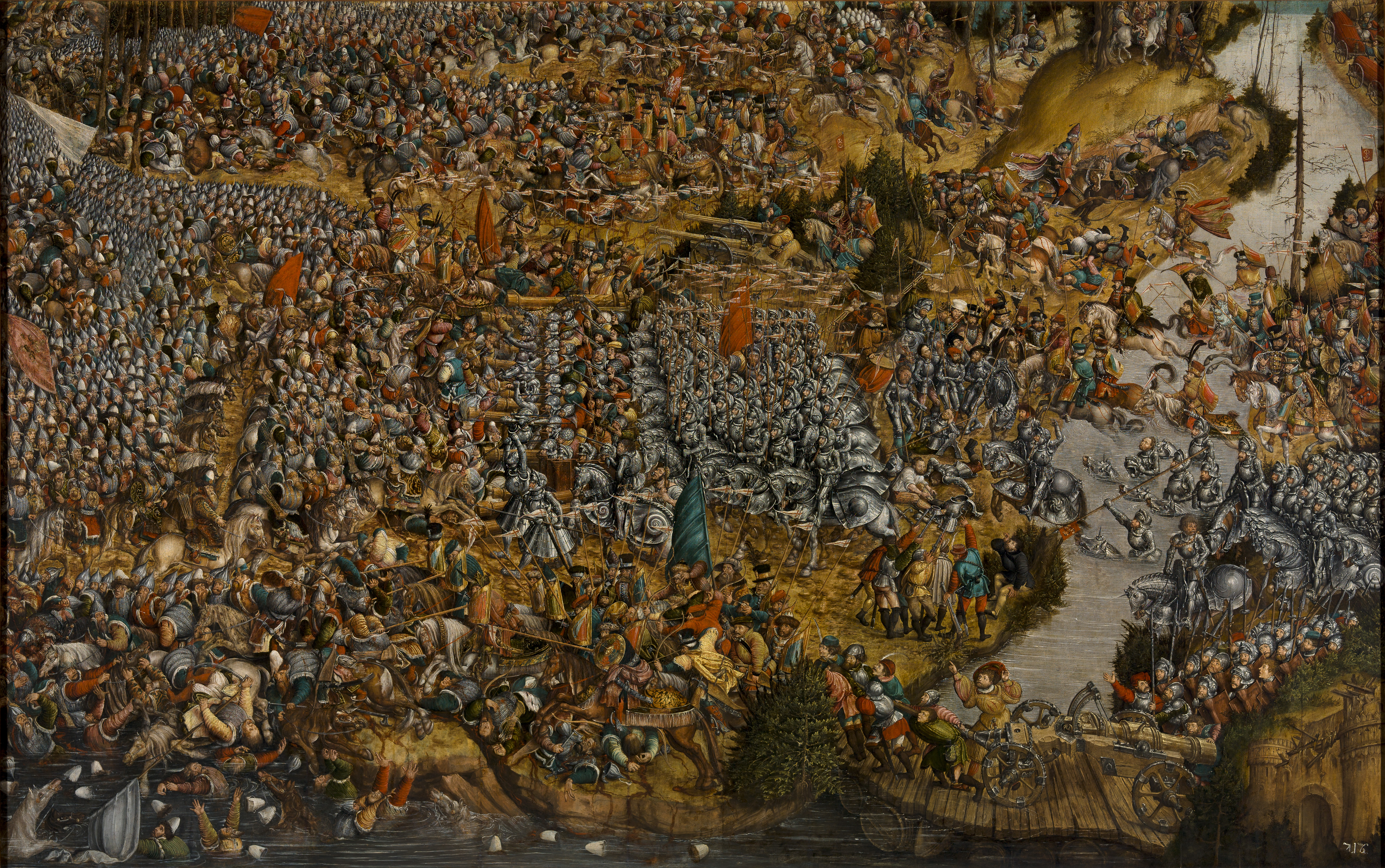
The victory of the Polish-Lithuanian forces over the Muscovites at the Battle of Orsha in 1514

In this way, internal consolidation accompanied outward expansion of the state. By the 16th century, the rulers of Moscow considered the entire Russian territory their collective property. Various semi-independent princes still claimed specific territories, but Ivan III forced the lesser princes to acknowledge the grand prince of Moscow and his descendants as unquestioned rulers with control over military, judicial, and foreign affairs. Gradually, the Russian ruler emerged as a powerful, autocratic ruler, a tsar. The first Russian ruler to officially crown himself "Tsar" was Ivan IV.

Ivan III tripled the territory of his state, ended the dominance of the Golden Horde over the Rus', renovated the Moscow Kremlin, and laid the foundations of the Russian state. Biographer Fennell concludes that his reign was "militarily glorious and economically sound," and especially points to his territorial annexations and his centralized control over local rulers. However, Fennell argues that his reign was also "a period of cultural depression and spiritual barrenness. Freedom was stamped out within the Russian lands. By his bigoted anti-Catholicism Ivan brought down the curtain between Russia and the west. For the sake of territorial aggrandizement he deprived his country of the fruits of Western learning and civilization."

== Tsardom of Russia (1547–1721) ==
=== Ivan IV, the Terrible ===
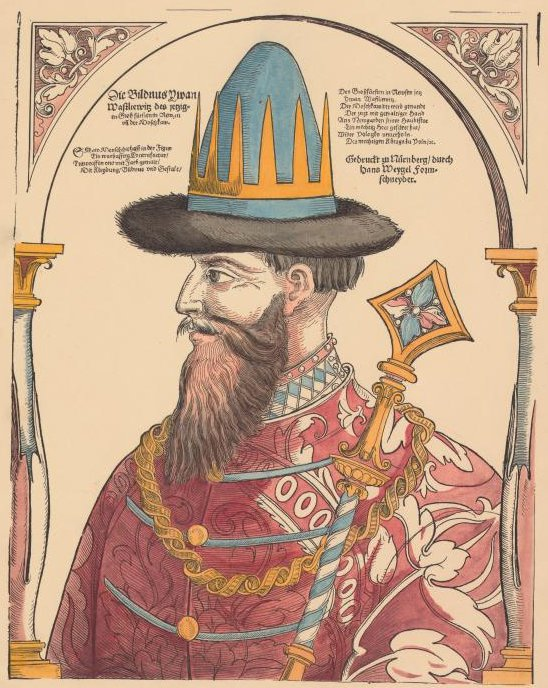
Ivan IV was the Grand Prince of Moscow from 1533 to 1547, then "Tsar of All the Russias" until his death in 1584.

The development of the Tsar's autocratic powers reached a peak during the reign of Ivan IV (1547–1584), known as "Ivan the Terrible". He strengthened the position of the monarch to an unprecedented degree, as he ruthlessly subordinated the nobles to his will, exiling or executing many on the slightest provocation. Nevertheless, Ivan is often seen as a farsighted statesman who reformed Russia as he promulgated a new code of laws (Sudebnik of 1550), established the first Russian feudal representative body (Zemsky Sobor), curbed the influence of the clergy, and introduced local self-management in rural regions. Tsar also created the first regular army in Russia: Streltsy.

His long Livonian War (1558–1583) for control of the Baltic coast and access to the sea trade ultimately proved a costly failure. Ivan managed to annex the Khanates of Kazan, Astrakhan, and Siberia. These conquests complicated the migration of aggressive nomadic hordes from Asia to Europe via the Volga and Urals. Through these conquests, Russia acquired a significant Muslim Tatar population and emerged as a multiethnic and multiconfessional state. Also around this period, the mercantile Stroganov family established a firm foothold in the Urals and recruited Russian Cossacks to colonise Siberia.

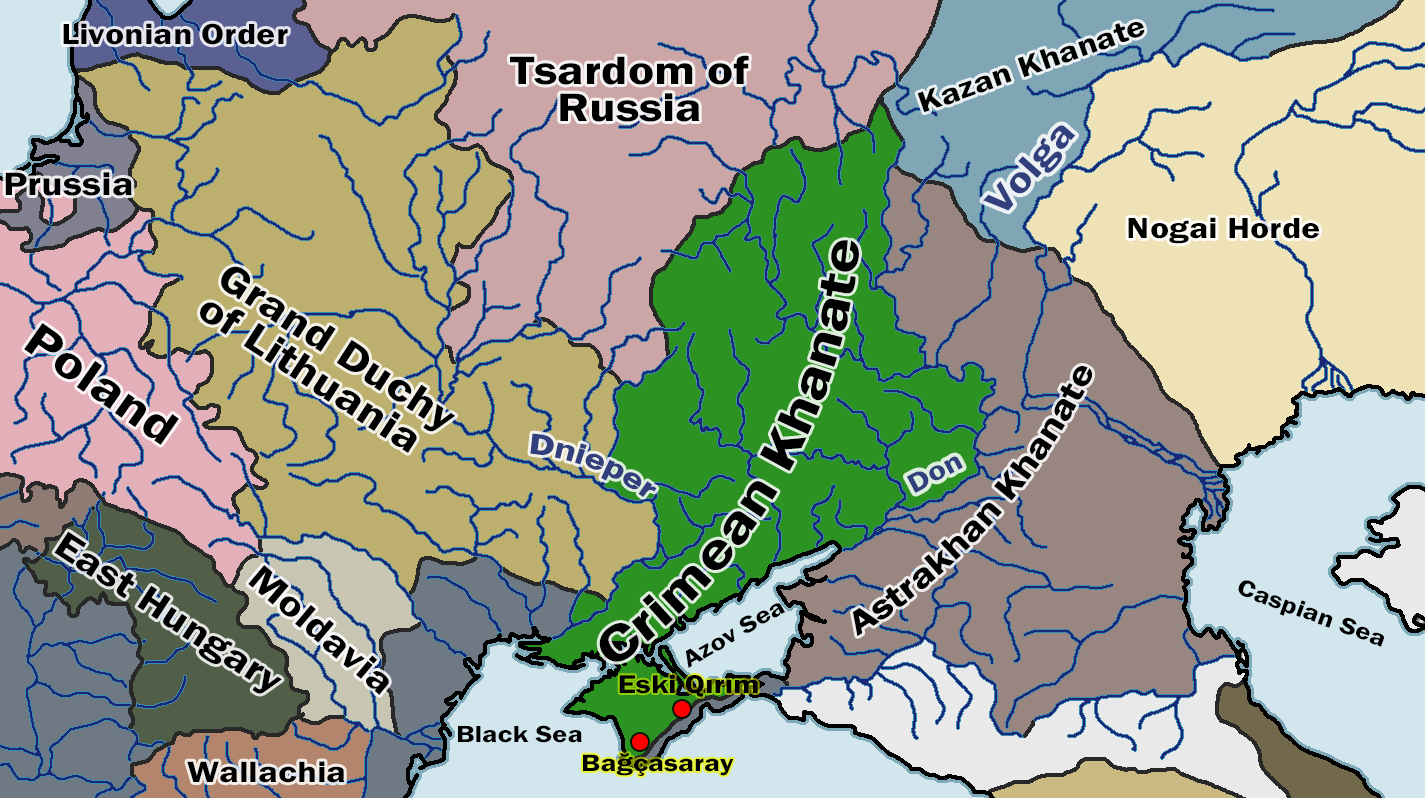
Khanates of Crimea, Astrakhan and Kazan in 1550, before the expansion of Ivan IV, which established Russian power over the entire length of the Volga.

In the later part of his reign, Ivan divided his realm in two. In the zone known as the oprichnina, Ivan's followers carried out a series of bloody purges of the feudal aristocracy (whom he suspected of treachery after prince Andrey Kurbsky's betrayal), culminating in the Massacre of Novgorod in 1570. This combined with the military losses, epidemics, and poor harvests so weakened Russia that the Crimean Tatars were able to sack central Russian regions and burn down Moscow in 1571. However, in 1572 the Russians defeated the Crimean Tatar army at the Battle of Molodi and Ivan abandoned the oprichnina.

At the end of Ivan IV's reign the Polish–Lithuanian and Swedish armies carried out a powerful intervention in Russia, devastating its northern and northwest regions.

=== Time of Troubles ===
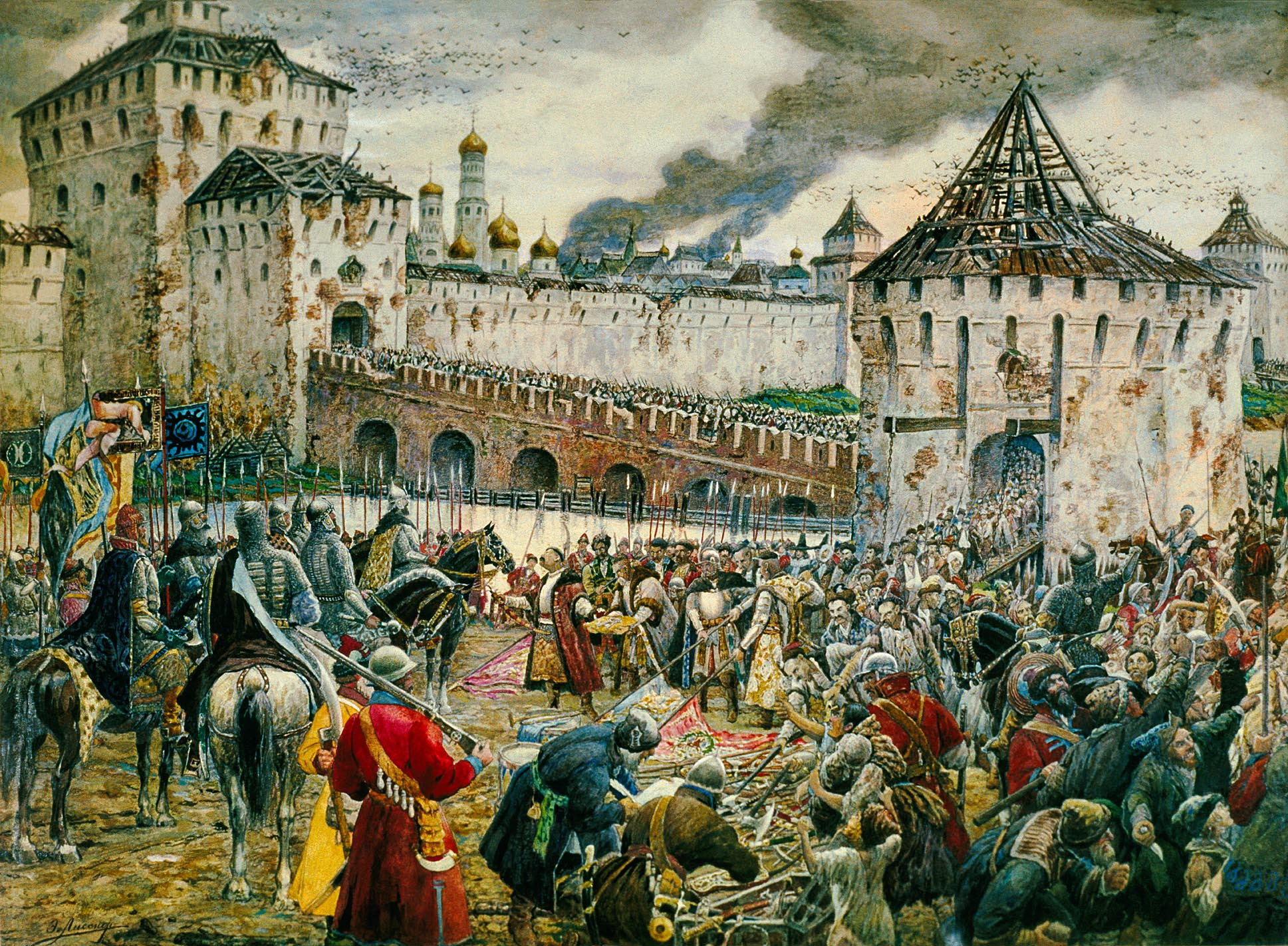
The Poles surrender the Moscow Kremlin to Prince Pozharsky in 1612

The death of Ivan's childless son Feodor was followed by a period of civil wars and foreign intervention known as the Time of Troubles (1606–13). Extremely cold summers (1601–1603) wrecked crops, which led to the Russian famine of 1601–1603 and increased the social disorganization. Boris Godunov's reign ended in chaos, civil war combined with foreign intrusion, devastation of many cities and depopulation of the rural regions. The country rocked by internal chaos also attracted several waves of interventions by the Polish–Lithuanian Commonwealth. During the Polish–Muscovite War (1605–1618), Polish–Lithuanian forces reached Moscow and installed the impostor False Dmitriy I in 1605, then supported False Dmitry II in 1607. The decisive moment came when a combined Russian-Swedish army was routed by the Polish forces under hetman Stanisław Żółkiewski at the Battle of Klushino on 4 July [O.S. 24 June] 1610. As the result of the battle, the Seven Boyars, a group of Russian nobles, deposed the tsar Vasily Shuysky on 27 July [O.S. 17 July] 1610, and recognized the Polish prince Władysław IV Vasa as the Tsar of Russia on 6 September [O.S. 27 August] 1610. The Poles occupied Moscow on 21 September [O.S. 11 September] 1610. Moscow revolted but riots there were brutally suppressed and the city was set on fire.

The crisis provoked a patriotic national uprising against the invasion, both in 1611 and 1612. A volunteer army, led by the merchant Kuzma Minin and prince Dmitry Pozharsky, expelled the foreign forces from the capital on 4 November [O.S. 25 October] 1612.

The Russian statehood survived the "Time of Troubles" and the rule of weak or corrupt Tsars because of the strength of the government's central bureaucracy. Government functionaries continued to serve, regardless of the ruler's legitimacy or the faction controlling the throne. However, the Time of Troubles caused the loss of much territory to the Polish–Lithuanian Commonwealth in the Russo-Polish war, as well as to the Swedish Empire in the Ingrian War.

=== Accession of the Romanovs and early rule ===
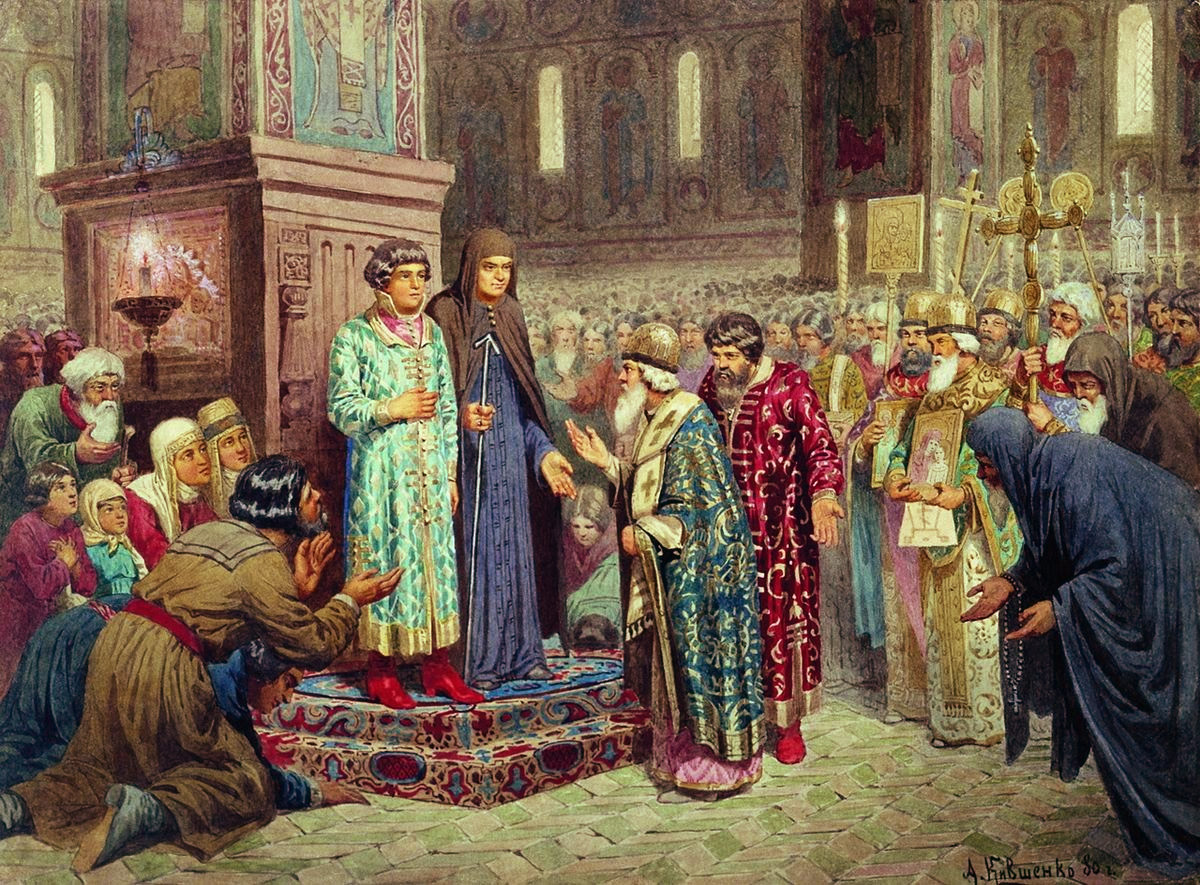
Election of 16-year-old Mikhail Romanov, the first Tsar of the Romanov dynasty

In February 1613, after the chaos and expulsion of the Poles from Moscow, an assembly of the land elected Michael Romanov, the young son of Patriarch Filaret, to the throne. The Romanov dynasty ruled Russia until 1917.

The immediate task of the new monarch was to restore peace. Fortunately for Moscow, its major enemies, the Polish–Lithuanian Commonwealth and Sweden, were engaged in a bitter conflict with each other, which provided Russia the opportunity to make peace with Sweden in 1617 and to sign a truce with the Polish–Lithuanian Commonwealth in 1619.

Recovery of lost territories began in the mid-17th century, when the Khmelnitsky Uprising (1648–1657) in Ukraine against Polish rule brought about the Treaty of Pereyaslav between Russia and the Ukrainian Cossacks. In the treaty, Russia granted protection to the Cossacks state in Left-bank Ukraine, formerly under Polish control. This triggered a prolonged Russo-Polish War (1654–1667), which ended with the Treaty of Andrusovo, where Poland accepted the loss of Left-bank Ukraine, Kiev and Smolensk. The Russian conquest of Siberia, begun at the end of the 16th century, continued in the 17th century. By the end of the 1640s, the Russians reached the Pacific Ocean, the Russian explorer Semyon Dezhnev, discovered the strait between Asia and America. Russian expansion in the Far East faced resistance from Qing China. After the war between Russia and China, the Treaty of Nerchinsk was signed, delimiting the territories in the Amur region.

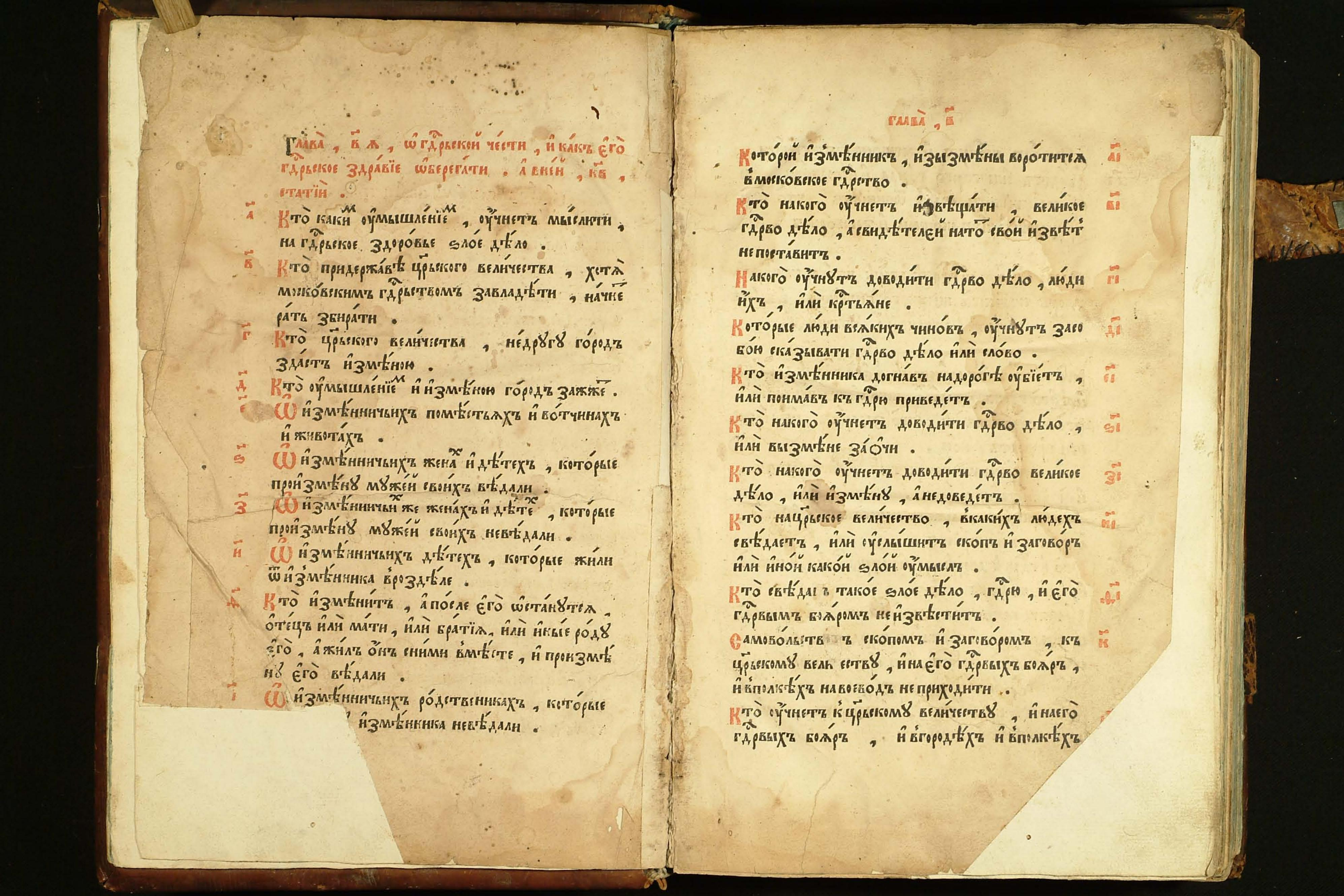
Sobornoye Ulozheniye was a legal code promulgated in 1649.

Rather than risk their estates in more civil war, the boyars cooperated with the first Romanovs, enabling them to finish the work of bureaucratic centralization. Thus, the state required service from both the old and the new nobility, primarily in the military. In return, the tsars allowed the boyars to complete the process of enserfing the peasants.

In the preceding century, the state had gradually curtailed peasants' rights to move from one landlord to another. With the state now fully sanctioning serfdom, runaway peasants became state fugitives, and the power of the landlords over the peasants "attached" to their land had become almost complete. Together, the state and the nobles placed an overwhelming burden of taxation on the peasants, whose rate was 100 times greater in the mid-17th century than it had been a century earlier. Likewise, middle-class urban tradesmen and craftsmen were assessed taxes, and were forbidden to change residence. All segments of the population were subject to military levy and special taxes.

Riots among peasants and citizens of Moscow at this time were endemic and included the Salt Riot (1648), Copper Riot (1662), and the Moscow Uprising (1682). By far the greatest peasant uprising in 17th-century Europe erupted in 1667. As the free settlers of South Russia, the Cossacks, reacted against the growing centralization of the state, serfs escaped from their landlords and joined the rebels. The Cossack leader Stenka Razin led his followers up the Volga River, inciting peasant uprisings and replacing local governments with Cossack rule. The tsar's army finally crushed his forces in 1670; a year later Stenka was captured and beheaded. Yet, less than half a century later, the strains of military expeditions produced another revolt in Astrakhan, ultimately subdued.

== Russian Empire (1721–1917) ==
=== Population ===
Much of Russia's expansion occurred in the 17th century, culminating in the first Russian colonisation of the Pacific in the mid-17th century, the Russo-Polish War (1654–1667) that incorporated left-bank Ukraine, and the Russian conquest of Siberia. Poland was divided in the 1790–1815 era, with much of the land and population going to Russia. Most of the 19th century growth came from adding territory in Asia, south of Siberia.

Year	Population of Russia (millions)	Notes
1720	16	includes new Baltic & Polish territories
1795	38	includes part of Poland
1812	43	includes Finland
1816	73	includes Congress Poland, Bessarabia
1897	129	at the first census
1914	170	includes new Asian territories

=== Peter the Great ===
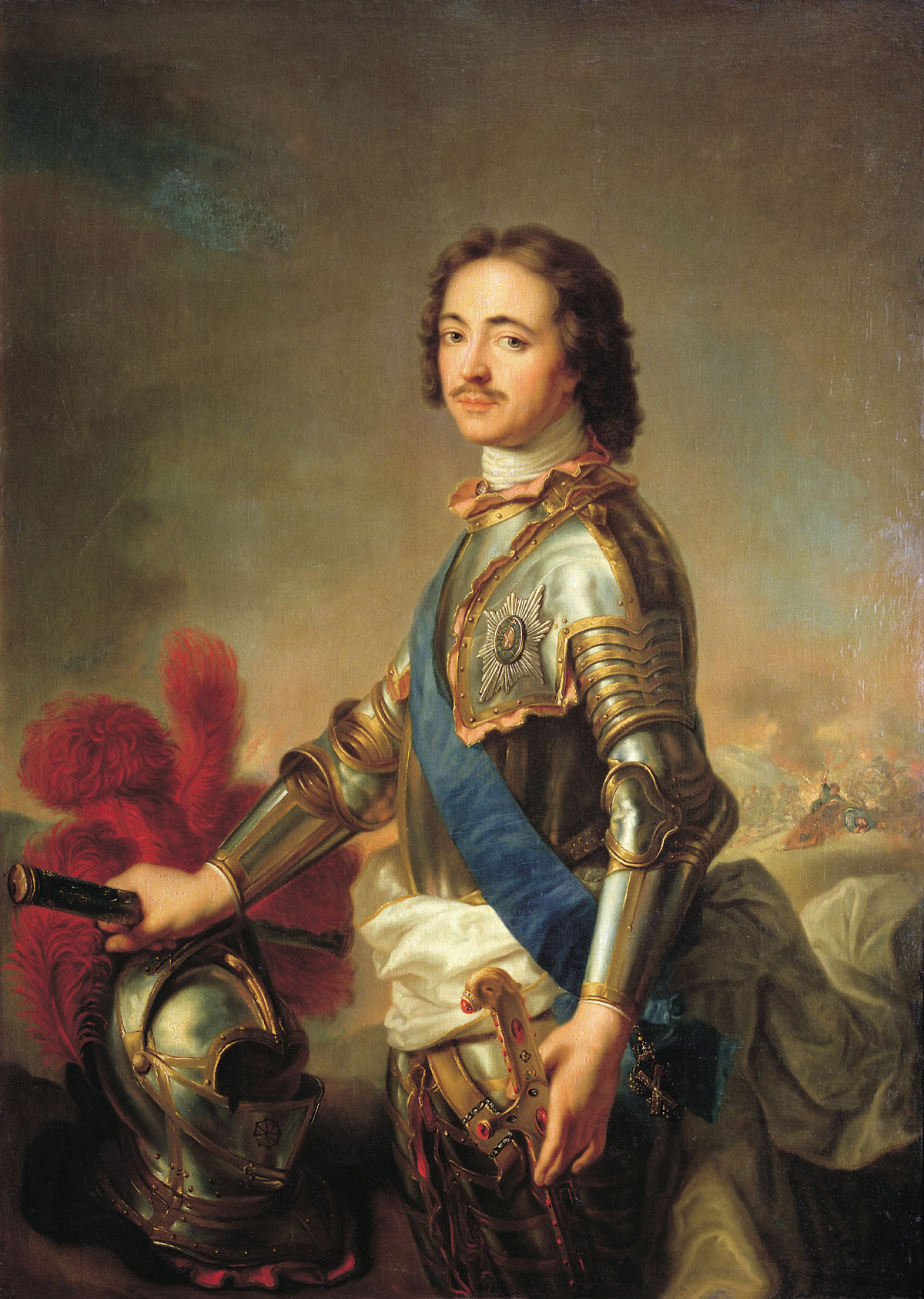
Peter I, called "Peter the Great"

Peter the Great (Peter I, 1672–1725) brought centralized autocracy into Russia and played a major role in bringing his country into the European state system. Russia was now the largest country in the world, stretching from the Baltic Sea to the Pacific Ocean. The vast majority of the land was unoccupied, and travel was slow. Much of its expansion had taken place in the 17th century, culminating in the first Russian settlement of the Pacific in the mid-17th century, the reconquest of Kiev, and the pacification of the Siberian tribes. However, a population of only 14 million was stretched across this vast landscape. With a short growing season, grain yields trailed behind those in the West and potato farming was not yet widespread. As a result, the great majority of the population workforce was occupied with agriculture. Russia remained isolated from the sea trade and its internal trade, communication and manufacturing were seasonally dependent.

Peter reformed the Russian army and created the Russian navy. Peter's first military efforts were directed against the Ottoman Turks. His aim was to establish a Russian foothold on the Black Sea by taking the town of Azov. His attention then turned to the north. Peter still lacked a secure northern seaport except at Archangel on the White Sea, whose harbor was frozen nine months a year. Access to the Baltic was blocked by Sweden, whose territory enclosed it on three sides. Peter's ambitions for a "window to the sea" led him in 1699 to make a secret alliance with the Polish–Lithuanian Commonwealth and Denmark against Sweden resulting in the Great Northern War.

The war ended in 1721 when an exhausted Sweden sued for peace with Russia. Peter acquired four provinces situated south and east of the Gulf of Finland, thus securing his coveted access to the sea. There, in 1703, he had already founded the city that was to become Russia's new capital, Saint Petersburg. Russian intervention in the Commonwealth marked, with the Silent Sejm, the beginning of a 200-year domination of that region by the Russian Empire. In celebration of his conquests, Peter assumed the title of emperor, and the Russian Tsardom officially became the Russian Empire in 1721.

Peter is primarily credited with the modernization of the country, quickly transforming it into a major European power. His administrative reforms, creating a Governing Senate in 1711, the Collegium in 1717 and the Table of Ranks in 1722 had a lasting impact on Russia. Peter re-organized his government based on the latest Western models, molding Russia into an absolutist state. He replaced the old boyar Duma (council of nobles) with a Senate, in effect a supreme council of state. The countryside was also divided into new provinces and districts. Peter told the senate that its mission was to collect taxes. In turn tax revenues tripled over the course of his reign.

Administrative Collegia (ministries) were established in St. Petersburg, to replace the old governmental departments. In 1722, Peter promulgated his famous Table of ranks. As part of the government reform, the Orthodox Church was partially incorporated into the country's administrative structure, in effect making it a tool of the state. Peter abolished the patriarchate and replaced it with a collective body, the Holy Synod, led by a lay government official. Peter continued and intensified his predecessors' requirement of state service for all nobles.

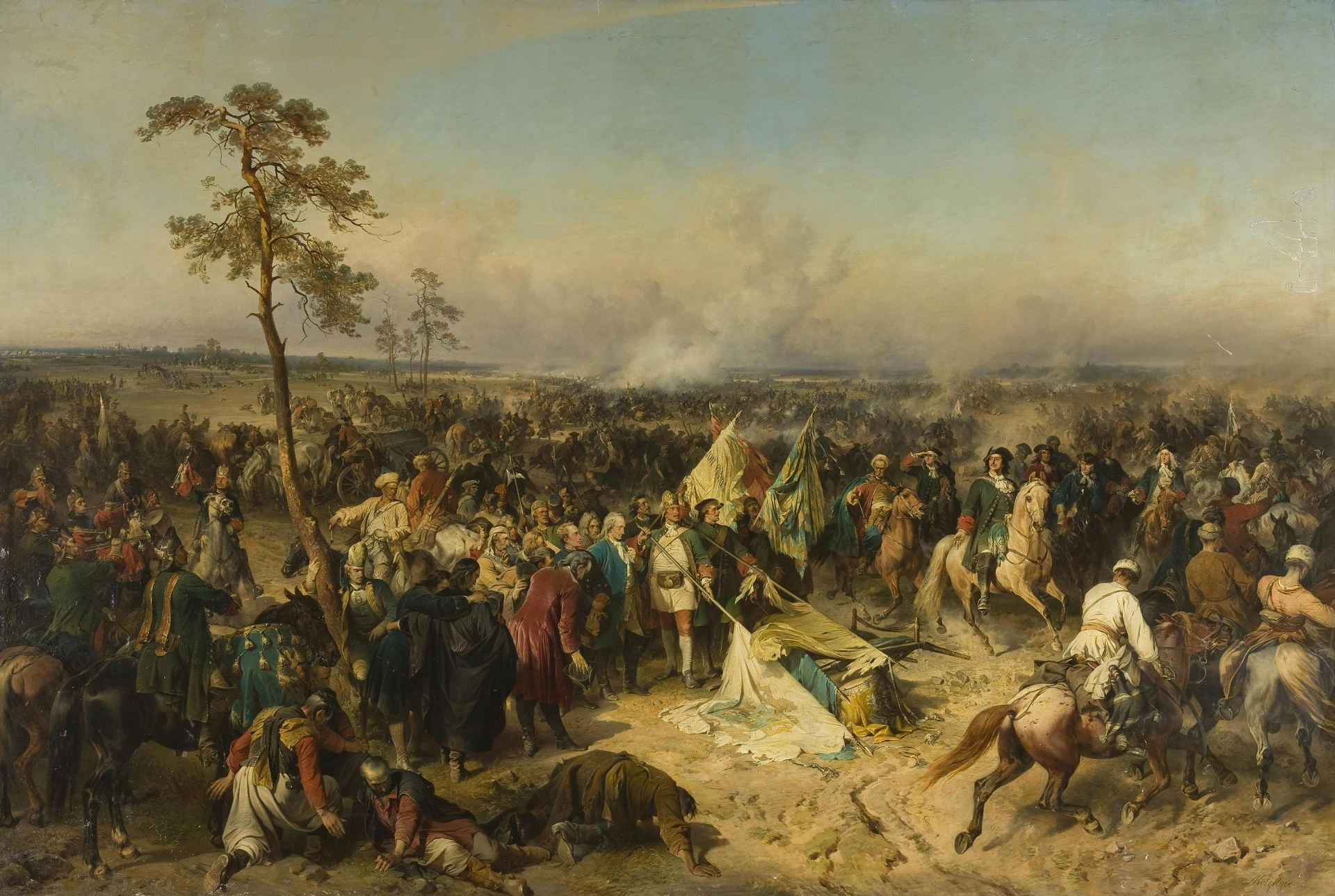
Russian victory at Battle of Poltava

By then, the once powerful Persian Safavid Empire to the south was heavily declining. Taking advantage, Peter launched the Russo-Persian War (1722–1723), known as "The Persian Expedition of Peter the Great" by Russian histographers, in order to be the first Russian emperor to establish Russian influence in the Caucasus and Caspian Sea region. After considerable success and the capture of many provinces and cities in the Caucasus and northern mainland Persia, the Safavids were forced to hand over the territories to Russia. However, by 12 years later, all the territories were ceded back to Persia, which was now led by the charismatic military genius Nader Shah, as part of the Treaty of Resht and Treaty of Ganja and the Russo-Persian alliance against the Ottoman Empire, the common neighbouring rivalling enemy.

Peter the Great died in 1725, leaving an unsettled succession, but Russia had become a great power by the end of his reign. Peter I was succeeded by his second wife, Catherine I (1725–1727), who was merely a figurehead for a powerful group of high officials, then by his minor grandson, Peter II (1727–1730), then by his niece, Anna (1730–1740), daughter of Tsar Ivan V. The heir to Anna was soon deposed in a coup and Elizabeth, daughter of Peter I, ruled from 1741 to 1762. During her reign, Russia took part in the Seven Years' War.

=== Catherine the Great ===
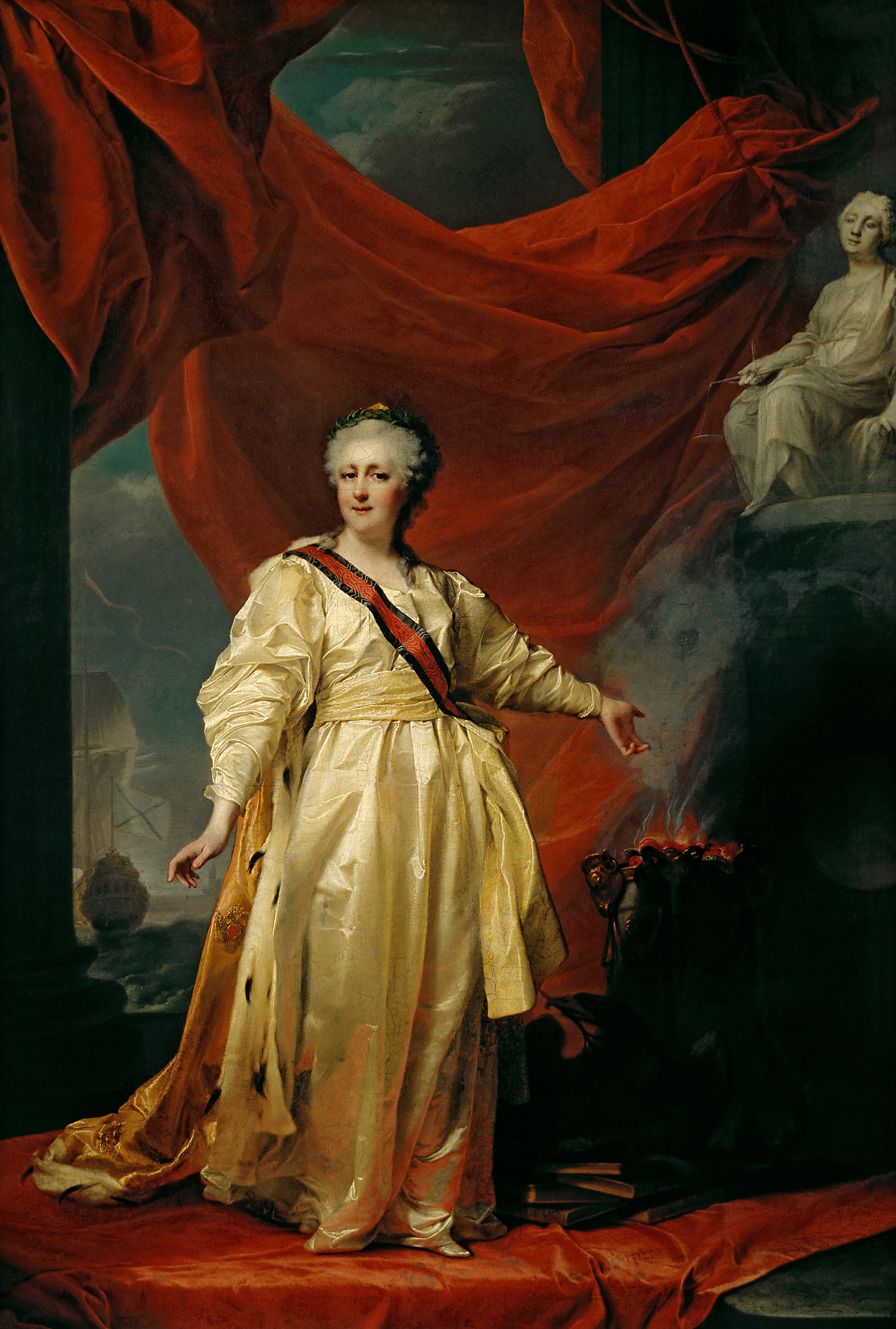
Catherine the Great

Nearly 40 years passed before a comparably ambitious ruler appeared. Catherine II, "the Great" (r. 1762–1796), was a German princess who married the German heir to the Russian crown. Catherine overthrew him in a coup in 1762, becoming queen regnant. Catherine enthusiastically supported the ideals of The Enlightenment, thus earning the status of an enlightened despot. She patronized the arts, science and learning. She contributed to the resurgence of the Russian nobility that began after the death of Peter the Great. Catherine promulgated the Charter to the Gentry reaffirming rights and freedoms of the Russian nobility and abolishing mandatory state service. She seized control of all the church lands, drastically reduced the size of the monasteries, and put the surviving clergy on a tight budget.

Catherine spent heavily to promote an expansive foreign policy. She extended Russian political control over the Polish–Lithuanian Commonwealth with actions, including the support of the Targowica Confederation. The cost of her campaigns, plus the oppressive social system that required serfs to spend almost all their time laboring on the land of their lords, provoked a major peasant uprising in 1773. Inspired by a Cossack named Yemelyan Pugachev, with the emphatic cry of "Hang all the landlords!", the rebels threatened to take Moscow until Catherine crushed the rebellion. Like the other enlightened despots of Europe, Catherine made certain of her own power and formed an alliance with the nobility.

Catherine successfully waged two wars (1768–1774, 1787–1792) against the decaying Ottoman Empire and advanced Russia's southern boundary to the Black Sea. In 1775 she liquidated the Zaporozhian Sich, and on the former lands of the Ukrainian Cossacks in the places of theirs settlements was created Novorossiya Governorate, in which new cities were formed: Yekaterinoslav (1776), Yelisavetgrad, Kherson (1778), Odessa (1794). Russia annexed Crimea in 1783 and created the Black Sea fleet. Then, by allying with the rulers of Austria and Prussia, she incorporated the territories of the Polish–Lithuanian Commonwealth, where after a century of Russian rule non-Catholic, mainly Orthodox population prevailed during the Partitions of Poland, pushing the Russian frontier westward into Central Europe.

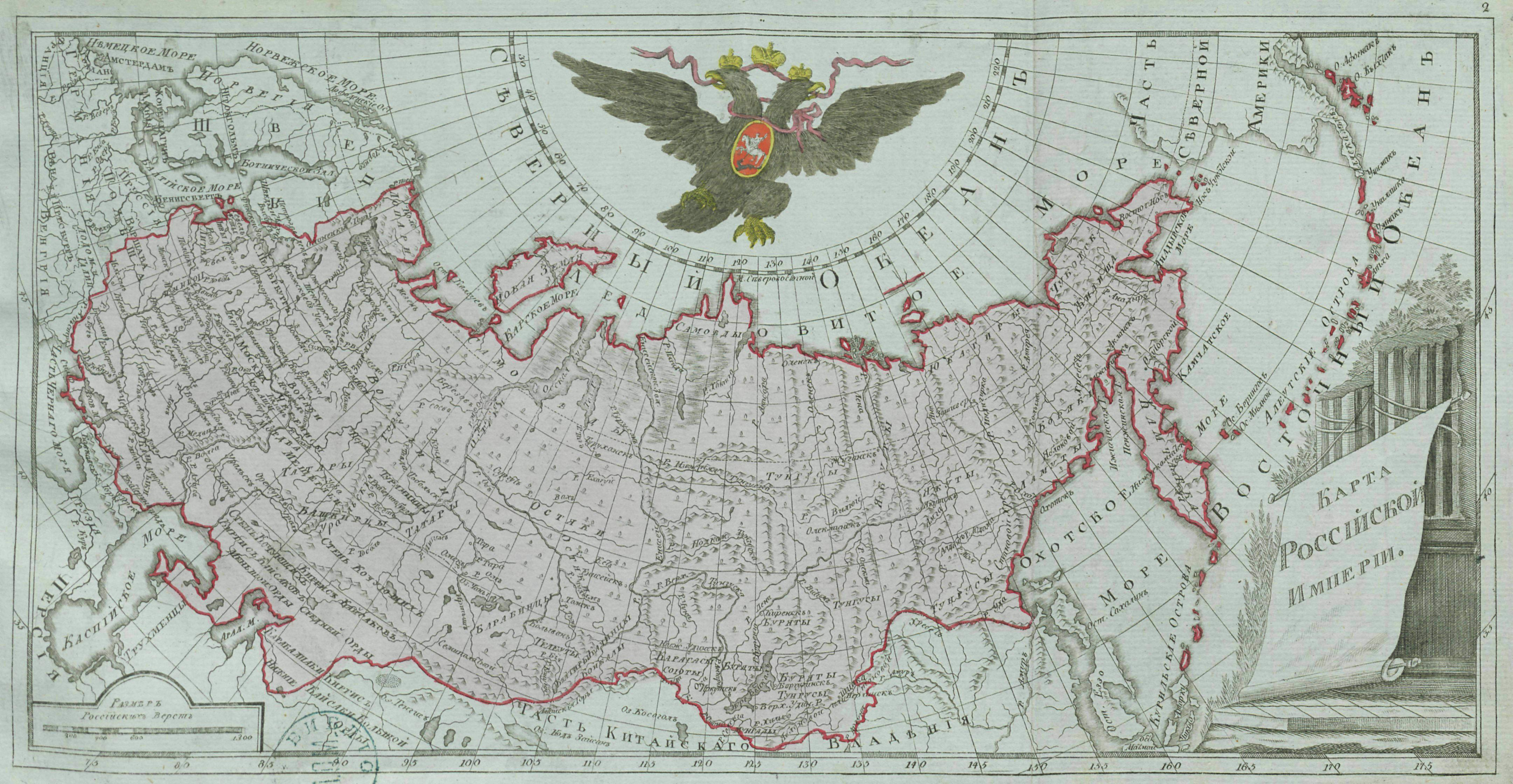
The Russian Empire in 1792

In accordance to Russia's treaty with the Georgians to protect them against any new invasion of their Persian suzerains and further political aspirations, Catherine waged a new war against Persia in 1796 after they had again invaded Georgia and established rule over it about a year prior, and had expelled the newly established Russian garrisons in the Caucasus.

In 1798–1799, Russian troops participated in the anti-French coalition, the troops under the command of Alexander Suvorov defeated the French in Northern Italy.

=== Ruling the Empire (1725–1825) ===
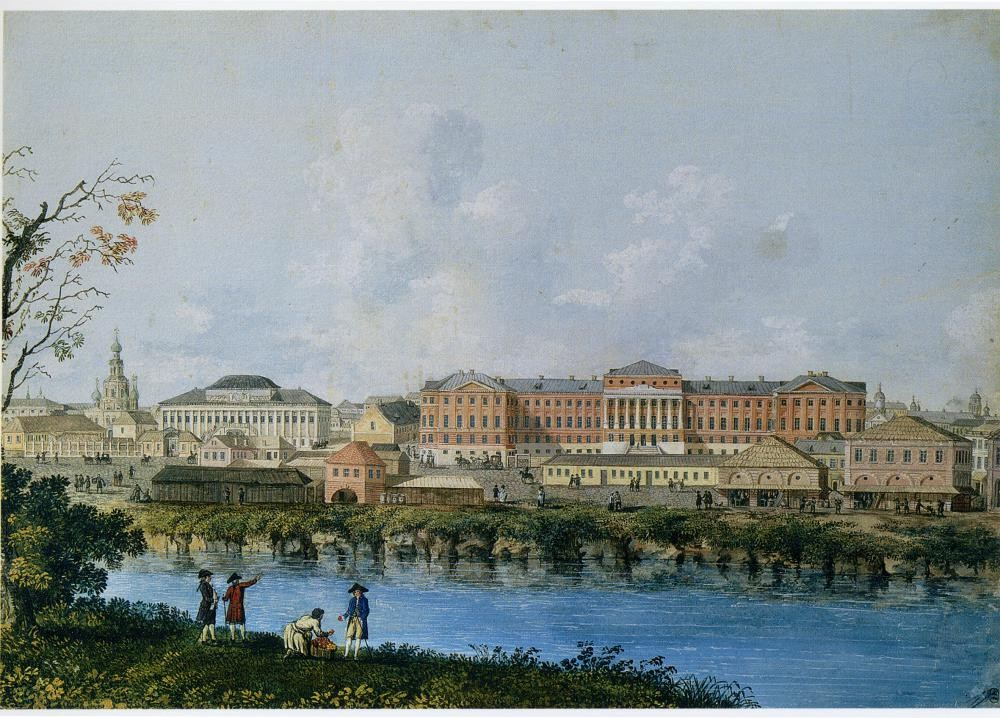
Moscow University in the 1790s

Russian emperors of the 18th century professed the ideas of Enlightened absolutism. However, Westernization and modernization affected only the upper classes of Russian society, while the bulk of the population, consisting of peasants, remained in a state of serfdom. Powerful Russians resented their privileged positions and alien ideas. The backlash was especially severe after the Napoleonic wars. It produced a powerful anti-western campaign that "led to a wholesale purge of Western specialists and their Russian followers in universities, schools, and government service". The mid-18th century was marked by the emergence of higher education in Russia. The first two major universities Saint Petersburg State University and Moscow State University were opened. Russian exploration of Siberia and the Far East continued. Great Northern Expedition laid the foundation for the development of Alaska by the Russians. By the end of the 18th century, Alaska became a Russian colony (Russian America). In the early 19th century, Alaska was used as a base for the First Russian circumnavigation. In 1819–1821, Russian sailors discovered Antarctica during an Antarctic expedition.

Russia was in a continuous state of financial crisis. While revenue rose from 9 million rubles in 1724 to 40 million in 1794, expenses grew more rapidly, reaching 49 million in 1794. The budget was allocated 46% to the military, 20% to government economic activities, 12% to administration, and 9% for the Imperial Court in St. Petersburg. The deficit required borrowing, primarily from Amsterdam; 5% of the budget was allocated to debt payments. Paper money was issued to pay for expensive wars, thus causing inflation. 18th-century Russia remained "a poor, backward, overwhelmingly agricultural, and illiterate country".

=== Alexander I and victory over Napoleon ===
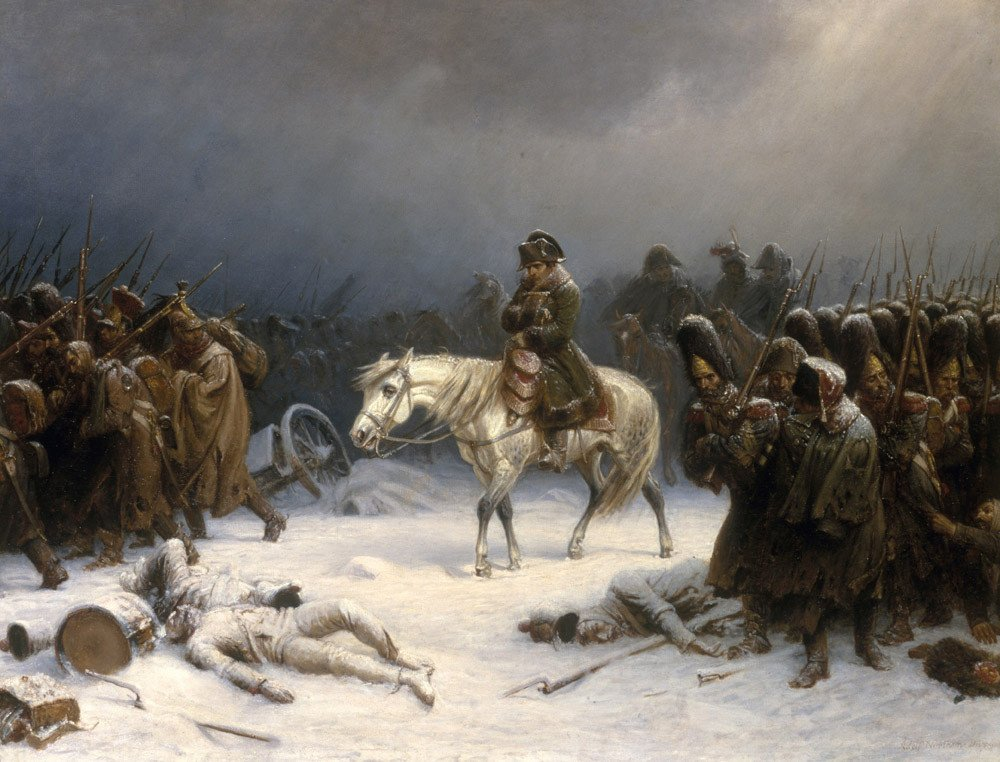
Napoleon's retreat from Moscow

By the time of her death in 1796, Catherine's expansionist policy had made Russia a major European power. Alexander I continued this policy, wresting Finland from the weakened kingdom of Sweden in 1809 and Bessarabia from the Ottomans in 1812. His key advisor was a Polish nobleman Adam Jerzy Czartoryski.

After Russian armies liberated allied Georgia from Persian occupation in 1802, they clashed with Persia over control and consolidation over Georgia, as well as the Iranian territories that comprise modern-day Azerbaijan and Dagestan. They also became involved in the Caucasian War against the Caucasian Imamate and Circassia. In 1813, the war with Persia concluded with a Russian victory, forcing Qajar Iran to cede swaths of its territories in the Caucasus to Russia, which drastically increased its territory in the region. To the south-west, Russia tried to expand at the expense of the Ottoman Empire, using Georgia at its base for the Caucasus and Anatolian front.

In European policy, Alexander I switched Russia back and forth four times in 1804–1812 from neutral peacemaker to anti-Napoleon to an ally of Napoleon, winding up in 1812 as Napoleon's enemy. In 1805, he joined Britain in the War of the Third Coalition against Napoleon, but after the massive defeat at the Battle of Austerlitz he switched and formed an alliance with Napoleon by the Treaty of Tilsit (1807) and joined Napoleon's Continental System. He fought a small-scale naval war against Britain, 1807–1812.

The alliance collapsed by 1810. Russia's economy had been hurt by Napoleon's Continental System, which cut off trade with Britain. As Esdaile notes, "Implicit in the idea of a Russian Poland was, of course, a war against Napoleon". Schroeder says Poland was the root cause of the conflict but Russia's refusal to support the Continental System was also a factor.

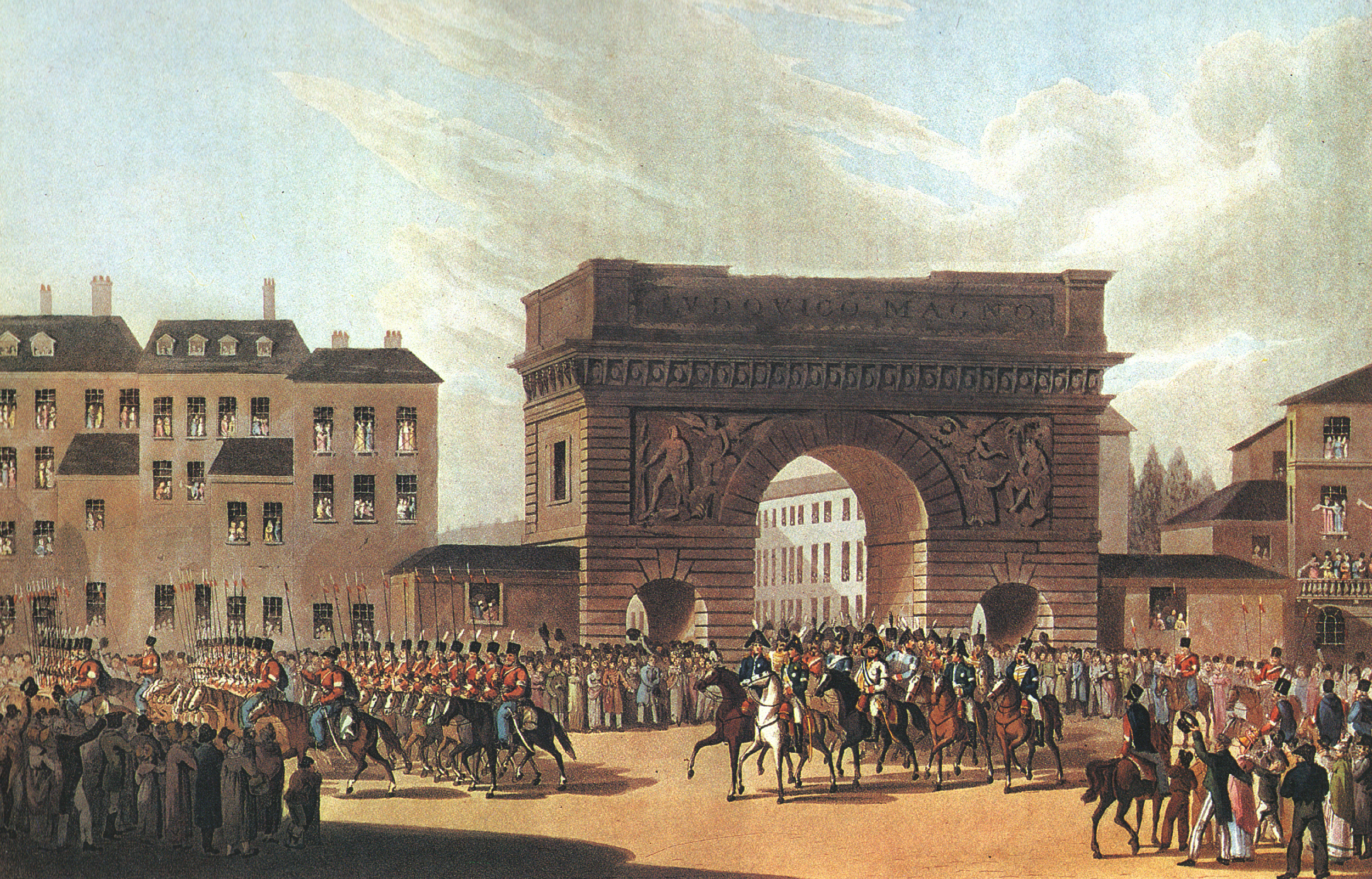
The entry of Russian troops into Paris in 1814, headed by the Emperor Alexander I

The invasion of Russia was a catastrophe for Napoleon and his 450,000 invasion troops. One major battle was fought at Borodino; casualties were very high, but it was indecisive, and Napoleon was unable to engage and defeat the Russian armies. He tried to force the Tsar to terms by capturing Moscow at the onset of winter, even though he had lost most of his men. Instead, the Russians retreated, burning crops and food supplies in a scorched earth policy that multiplied Napoleon's logistic problems: 85%–90% of Napoleon's soldiers died from disease, cold, starvation or ambush by peasant guerrillas. As Napoleon's forces retreated, Russian troops pursued them into Central and Western Europe, defeated Napoleon's army in the Battle of the Nations and finally captured Paris. Of a total population of around 43 million people, Russia lost about 1.5 million in the year 1812; of these about 250,000 to 300,000 were soldiers and the rest peasants and serfs.

After the defeat of Napoleon, Alexander presided over the redrawing of the map of Europe at the Congress of Vienna (1814–1815), which made him the king of Congress Poland. He formed the Holy Alliance with Austria and Prussia, to suppress revolutionary movements in Europe that he saw as immoral threats to legitimate Christian monarchs. He helped Austria's Klemens von Metternich in suppressing all national and liberal movements.

Although the Russian Empire would play a leading role on behalf of conservatism as late as 1848, its retention of serfdom precluded economic progress of any significant degree. As West European economic growth accelerated during the Industrial Revolution, sea trade and colonialism which had begun in the second half of the 18th century, Russia began to lag ever farther behind, undermining its ability to field strong armies.

=== Nicholas I and the Decembrist Revolt ===
The Decembrists at the Senate Square

Russia's great power status obscured the inefficiency of its government, the isolation of its people, and its economic backwardness. Following the defeat of Napoleon, Alexander I was willing to discuss constitutional reforms, and though a few were introduced, no thoroughgoing changes were attempted.

The tsar was succeeded by his younger brother, Nicholas I (1825–1855), who at the onset of his reign was confronted with an uprising. The background of this revolt lay in the Napoleonic Wars, when a number of well-educated Russian officers traveled in Europe in the course of the military campaigns, where their exposure to the liberalism of Western Europe encouraged them to seek change on their return. The result was the Decembrist Revolt (December 1825), the work of a small circle of liberal nobles and army officers who wanted to install Nicholas' brother as a constitutional monarch. But the revolt was easily crushed, leading Nicholas to turn away from liberal reforms and champion the reactionary doctrine "Orthodoxy, Autocracy, and Nationality".

In 1826–1828, Russia fought another war against Persia. Russia lost almost all of its recently consolidated territories during the first year but regained them and won the war on highly favourable terms. At the 1828 Treaty of Turkmenchay, Russia gained Armenia, Nakhchivan, Nagorno-Karabakh, Azerbaijan, and Iğdır. In the 1828–1829 Russo-Turkish War Russia invaded northeastern Anatolia and occupied the strategic Ottoman towns of Erzurum and Gümüşhane and, posing as protector and saviour of the Greek Orthodox population, received extensive support from the region's Pontic Greeks. After a brief occupation, the Russian imperial army withdrew into Georgia. By the 1830s, Russia had conquered all Persian territories and major Ottoman territories in the Caucasus.

In 1831, Nicholas crushed the November Uprising in Poland. The Russian autocracy gave Polish artisans and gentry reason to rebel in 1863 by assailing the national core values of language, religion, and culture. The resulting January Uprising was a massive Polish revolt, which also was crushed. France, Britain and Austria tried to intervene in the crisis but were unable. The Russian patriotic press used the Polish uprising to unify the Russian nation, claiming it was Russia's God-given mission to save Poland and the world. Poland was punished by losing its distinctive political and judicial rights, with Russianization imposed on its schools and courts.

=== Russian Army ===
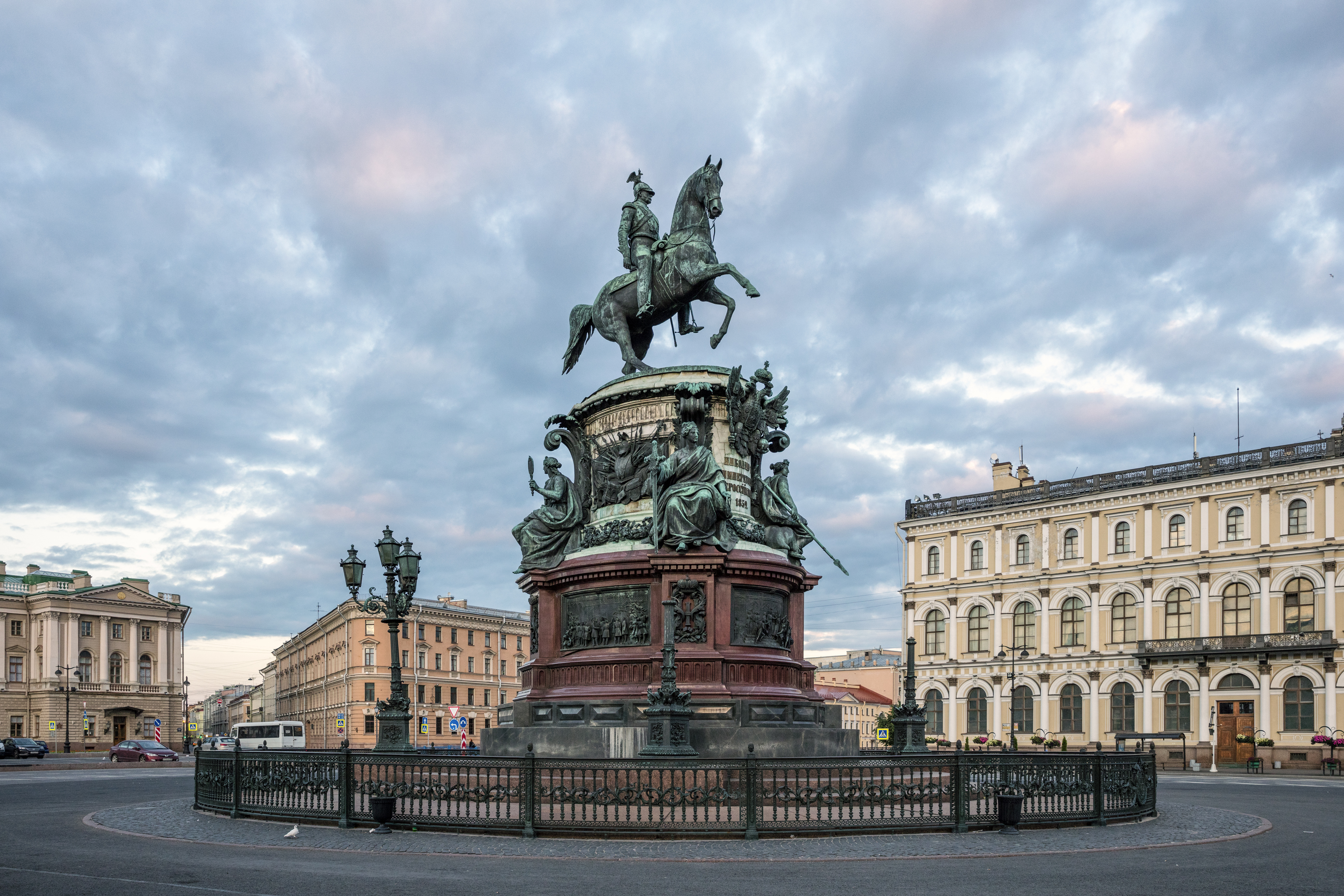
Monument to Nicholas I on St. Isaac's Square, Saint Petersburg

Tsar Nicholas I (reigned 1825–1855) lavished attention on his army. In a nation of 60–70 million people, it included a million men. They had outdated equipment and tactics, but the tsar took pride in its smartness on parade. The cavalry horses, for example, were only trained in parade formations, and did poorly in battle. He put generals in charge of most of his civilian agencies regardless of their qualifications. The Army became the vehicle of upward social mobility for noble youths from non-Russian areas, such as Poland, the Baltic, Finland and Georgia. On the other hand, many miscreants, petty criminals and undesirables were punished by local officials by enlisting them for life in the Army. Village oligarchies controlled employment, conscription for the army, and local patronage; they blocked reforms and sent the most unpromising peasant youth to the army. The conscription system was unpopular with people, as was the practice of forcing peasants to house the soldiers for six months of the year.

Finally the Crimean War at the end of his reign showed the world that Russia was militarily weak, technologically backward, and administratively incompetent. Despite his ambitions toward the south and Ottoman Empire, Russia had not built its railroad network in that direction, and communications were poor. The bureaucracy was riddled with corruption and inefficiency and was unprepared for war. The Navy was weak and technologically backward; the Army, although very large, was good only for parades, suffered from colonels who pocketed their men's pay, poor morale, and was even more out of touch with the latest technology. The nation's leaders realized that reforms were urgently needed.

=== Russian society in the first half of 19th century ===
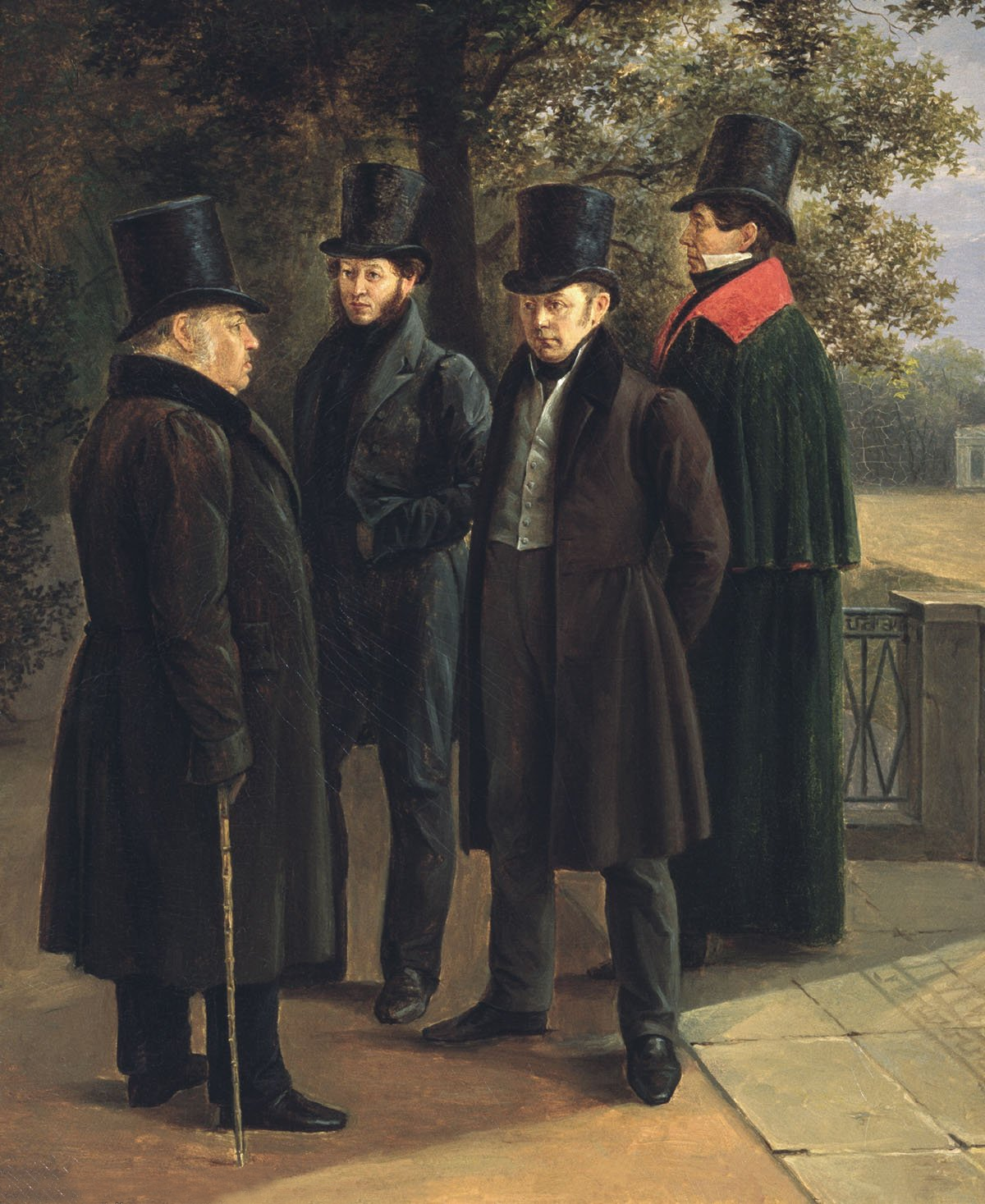
«Golden Age of Russian Poetry» writers: Pushkin, Krylov, Zhukovsky, and Gnedich

The early 19th century is the time when Russian literature becomes an independent and very striking phenomenon.

Westernizers favored imitating Western Europe while others renounced the West and called for a return of the traditions of the past. The latter path was championed by Slavophiles, who heaped scorn on the "decadent" West. The Slavophiles were opponents of bureaucracy and preferred the collectivism of the medieval Russian mir, or village community, to the individualism of the West. A forerunner of the Westernizer movement was Pyotr Chaadayev. He exposed the cultural isolation of Russia, from the perspective of Western Europe, in his Philosophical Letters of 1831. He cast doubt on the greatness of the Russian past, and ridiculed Orthodoxy for failing to provide a sound spiritual basis for the Russian mind. He called on Russia to emulate Western Europe, especially in rational and logical thought, its progressive spirit, its leadership in science, and indeed its leadership on the path to freedom. Vissarion Belinsky and Alexander Herzen were prominent Westernizers.

=== Crimean War ===
Since the war against Napoleon, Russia had become deeply involved in the affairs of Europe, as part of the "Holy Alliance." The Holy Alliance was formed to serve as the "policeman of Europe." However, to maintain the alliance required large armies. Prussia, Austria, Britain and France (the other members of the alliance) lacked large armies and needed Russia to supply the required numbers, which fit the philosophy of Nicholas I. The Tsar sent his army into Hungary in 1849 at the request of the Austrian Empire and broke the revolt there, while preventing its spread to Russian Poland. The Tsar cracked down on any signs of internal unrest.

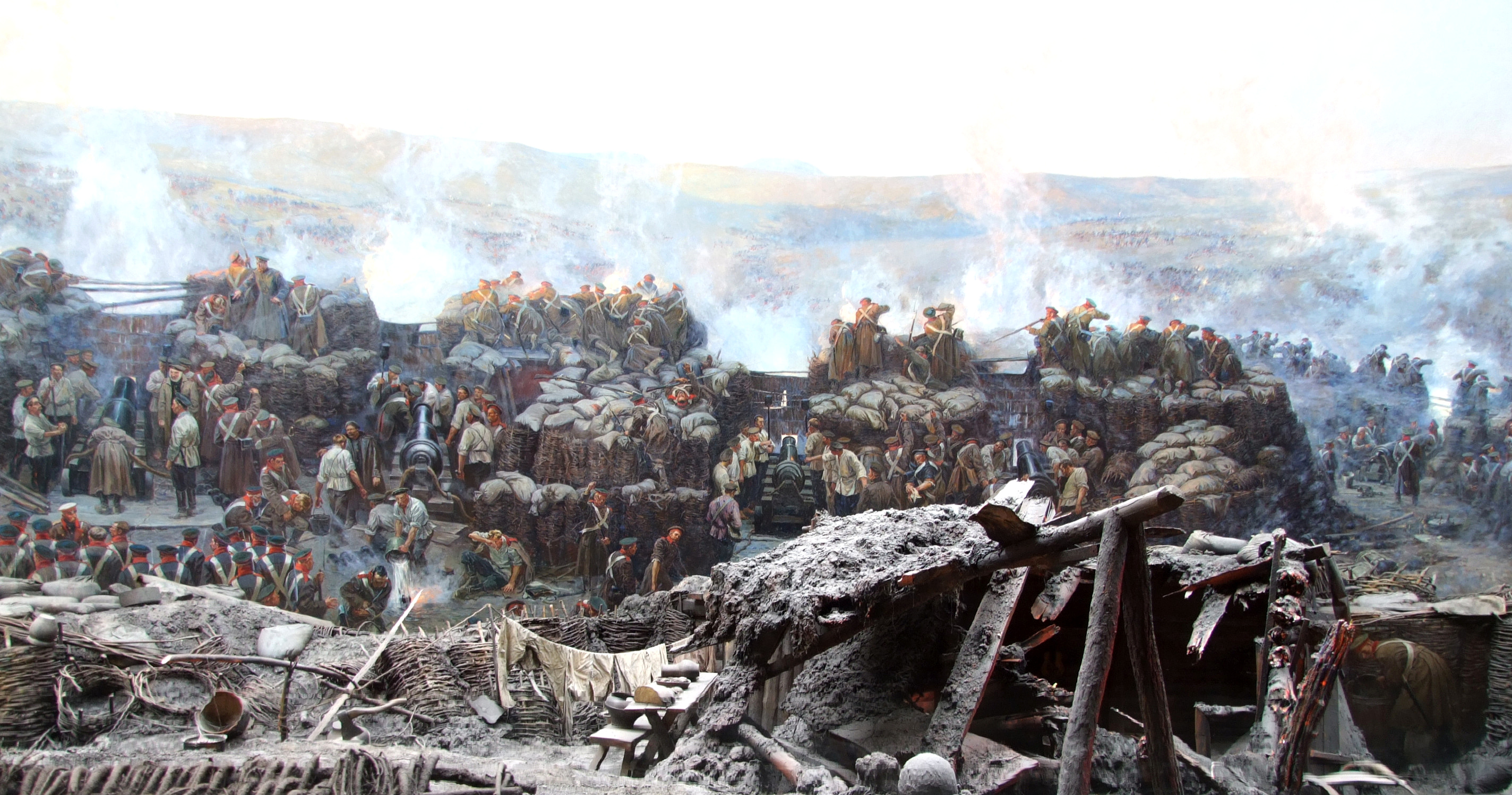
The eleven-month siege of a Russian naval base at Sevastopol during the Crimean War

Russia expected that in exchange for supplying the troops to be the policeman of Europe, it should have a free hand in dealing with the decaying Ottoman Empire—the "sick man of Europe." In 1853, Russia invaded Ottoman-controlled areas leading to the Crimean War. Britain and France came to the rescue of the Ottomans. After a grueling war fought largely in Crimea, with very high death rates from disease, the allies won.

Historian Orlando Figes points to the long-term damage Russia suffered:

The demilitarization of the Black Sea was a major blow to Russia, which was no longer able to protect its vulnerable southern coastal frontier against the British or any other fleet.... The destruction of the Russian Black Sea Fleet, Sevastopol and other naval docks was a humiliation. No compulsory disarmament had ever been imposed on a great power previously.... The Allies did not really think that they were dealing with a European power in Russia. They regarded Russia as a semi-Asiatic state....In Russia itself, the Crimean defeat discredited the armed services and highlighted the need to modernize the countries defenses, not just in the strictly military sense, but also through the building of railways, industrialization, sound finances and so on....The image many Russians had built up of their country – the biggest, richest and most powerful in the world – had suddenly been shattered. Russia's backwardness had been exposed....The Crimean disaster had exposed the shortcomings of every institution in Russia – not just the corruption and incompetence of the military command, the technological backwardness of the army and navy, or the inadequate roads and lack of railways the accounted for the chronic problems of supply, but the poor condition and illiteracy of the serfs who made up the armed forces, the inability of the serf economy to sustain a state of war against industrial powers, and the failures of autocracy itself.

=== Alexander II and the abolition of serfdom ===
When Alexander II came to the throne in 1855, the demand for reform was widespread. The most pressing problem confronting the Government was serfdom. In 1859, there were 23 million serfs (out of a total population of 67 million). In anticipation of civil unrest that could ultimately foment a revolution, Alexander II chose to preemptively abolish serfdom with the emancipation reform in 1861. Emancipation brought a supply of free labor to the cities, stimulated industry, and the middle class grew in number and influence. The freed peasants had to buy land, allotted to them, from the landowners with state assistance. The Government issued special bonds to the landowners for the land that they had lost, and collected a special tax from the peasants, called redemption payments, at a rate of 5% of the total cost of allotted land yearly. All the land turned over to the peasants was owned collectively by the mir, the village community, which divided the land among the peasants and supervised the various holdings.

The Russian Empire in 1867

Alexander was responsible for numerous reforms besides abolishing serfdom. He reorganized the judicial system, setting up elected local judges, abolishing capital punishment, promoting local self-government through the zemstvo system, imposing universal military service, ending some of the privileges of the nobility, and promoting the universities.

In foreign policy, he sold Alaska to the United States in 1867. He modernized the military command system. He sought peace, and joined with Germany and Austria in the League of the Three Emperors that stabilized the European situation. The Russian Empire expanded in Siberia and in the Caucasus and made gains at the expense of China. Faced with an uprising in Poland in 1863, he stripped that land of its separate Constitution and incorporated it directly into Russia. To counter the rise of a revolutionary and anarchistic movements, he sent thousands of dissidents into exile in Siberia and was proposing additional parliamentary reforms when he was assassinated in 1881.

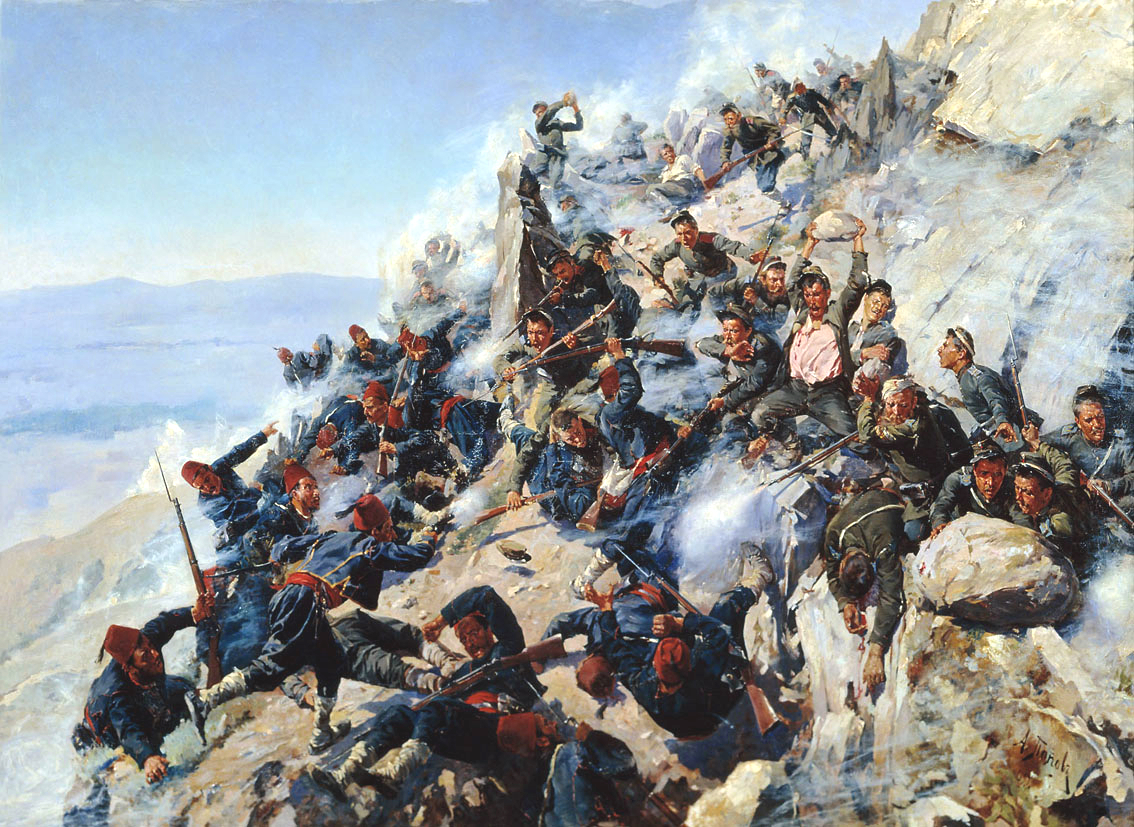
The Russian and Bulgarian defence of Shipka Pass against Turkish troops was crucial for the independence of Bulgaria

In the late 1870s Russia and the Ottoman Empire again clashed in the Balkans. The Russo-Turkish War was popular among the Russian people, who supported the independence of their fellow Orthodox Slavs, the Serbs and the Bulgarians. Russia's victory in this war allowed a number of Balkan states to gain independence: Romania, Serbia, Montenegro. In addition, Bulgaria de facto became independent. However, the war increased tension with Austria-Hungary, which also had ambitions in the region. The Tsar was disappointed by the results of the Congress of Berlin in 1878, but abided by the agreement.

During this period Russia expanded its empire into Central Asia, conquering the khanates of Kokand, Bukhara, and Khiva, as well as the Trans-Caspian region. Russia's advance in Asia led to British fears that the Russians planned aggression against British India. Before 1815 London worried Napoleon would combine with Russia to do that in one mighty campaign. After 1815 London feared Russia alone would do it step by step. However historians report that the Russians never had any intention to move against India.

=== Russian society in the second half of 19th century ===
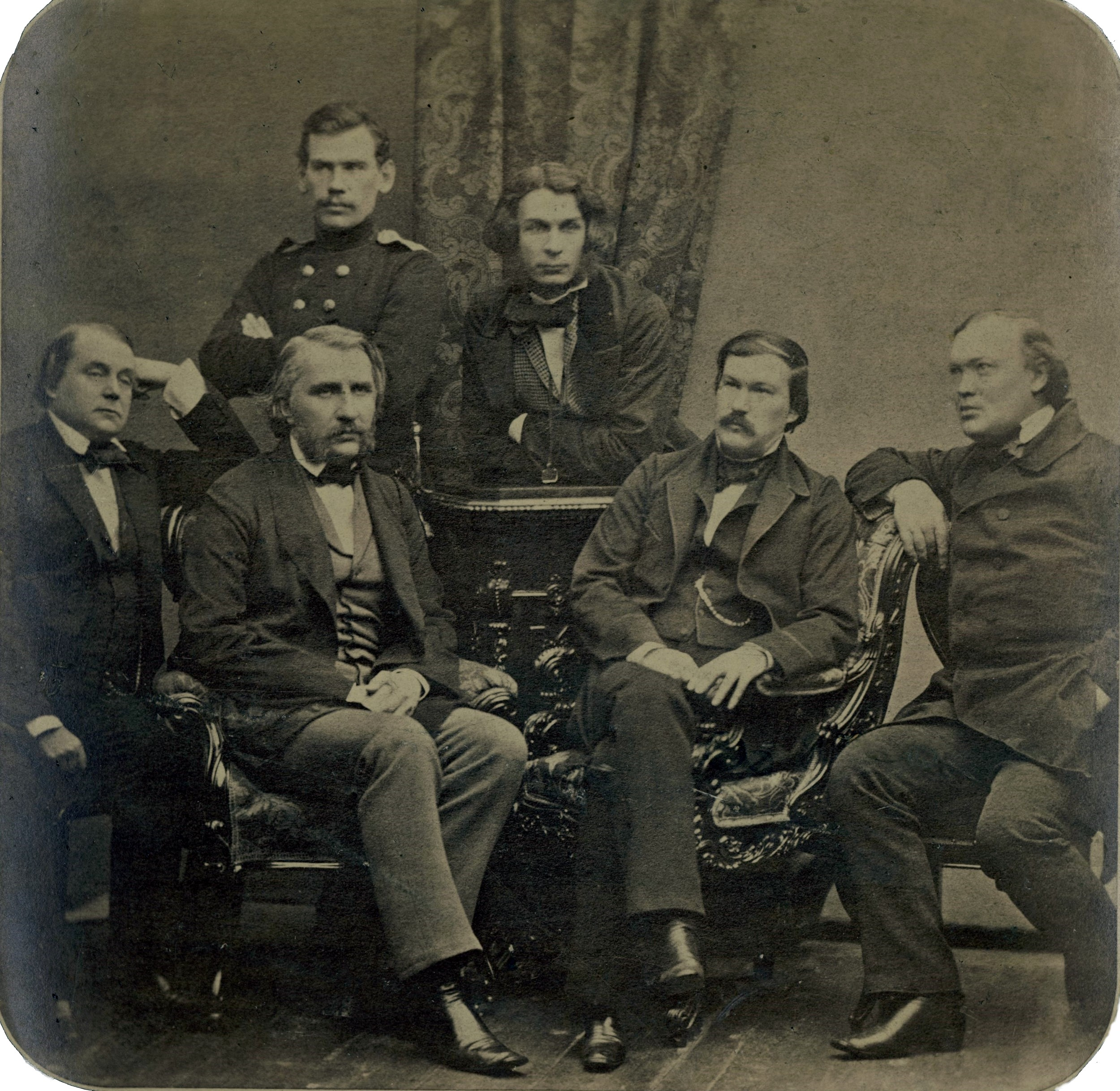
Russian writers of the second half of the 19th century: Leo Tolstoy, Dmitry Grigorovich, Ivan Goncharov, Ivan Turgenev, Alexander Druzhinin, and Alexander Ostrovsky

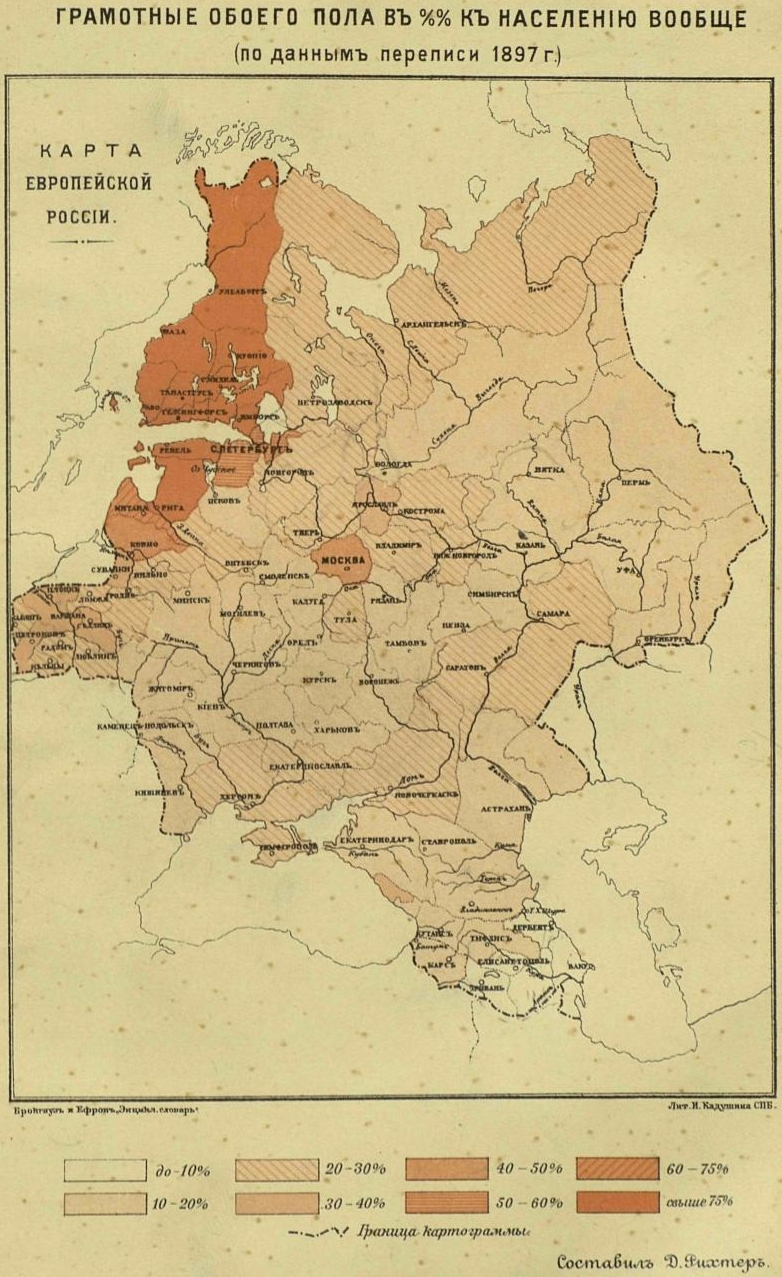
By the end of 19th century, the majority of the Russian population were unable to read and write (map of 1897 census literacy data)

In the 1860s, a movement known as Nihilism developed in Russia. A term originally coined by Ivan Turgenev in his 1862 novel Fathers and Sons, Nihilists favoured the destruction of human institutions and laws, based on the assumption that they are artificial and corrupt. At its core, Russian nihilism was characterized by the belief that the world lacks comprehensible meaning, objective truth, or value. For some time, many Russian liberals had been dissatisfied by what they regarded as the empty discussions of the intelligentsia. The Nihilists questioned all old values and shocked the Russian establishment. They became involved in the cause of reform and became major political forces. Their path was facilitated by the previous actions of the Decembrists, who revolted in 1825, and the financial and political hardship caused by the Crimean War, which caused many Russians to lose faith in political institutions. Russian nihilists created the manifesto Catechism of a Revolutionary.

After the Nihilists failed to convert the aristocracy and landed gentry to the cause of reform, they turned to the peasants. Their campaign became known as the Narodnk ("Populist") movement. It was based on the belief that the common people had the wisdom and peaceful ability to lead the nation. As the Narodnik movement gained momentum, the government moved to extirpate it. In response to the growing reaction of the government, a radical branch of the Narodniks advocated and practiced terrorism. One after another, prominent officials were shot or killed by bombs. This represented the ascendancy of anarchism in Russia as a powerful revolutionary force. Finally, after several attempts, Alexander II was assassinated by anarchists in 1881, on the very day he had approved a proposal to call a representative assembly to consider new reforms in addition to the abolition of serfdom designed to ameliorate revolutionary demands.

The end of the 19th century and the beginning of the 20th is known as the Silver Age of Russian culture. The Silver Age was dominated by the artistic movements of Russian Symbolism, Acmeism, and Russian Futurism, many poetic schools flourished, including the Mystical Anarchism tendency within the Symbolist movement. The Russian avant-garde was a large, influential wave of modern art that flourished in Russian Empire and Soviet Union, approximately from 1890 to 1930—although some have placed its beginning as early as 1850 and its end as late as 1960.

=== Autocracy and reaction under Alexander III ===
Unlike his father, the new tsar Alexander III (1881–1894) was throughout his reign a staunch reactionary who revived the maxim of "Orthodoxy, Autocracy, and National Character". A committed Slavophile, Alexander III believed that Russia could be saved from chaos only by shutting itself off from the subversive influences of Western Europe. In his reign Russia concluded the union with republican France to contain the growing power of Germany, completed the conquest of Central Asia, and exacted important territorial and commercial concessions from China.

The tsar's most influential adviser was Konstantin Pobedonostsev, tutor to Alexander III and his son Nicholas, and procurator of the Holy Synod from 1880 to 1895. He taught his royal pupils to fear freedom of speech and press and to hate democracy, constitutions, and the parliamentary system. Under Pobedonostsev, revolutionaries were hunted down and a policy of Russification was carried out.

=== Nicholas II and new revolutionary movement ===
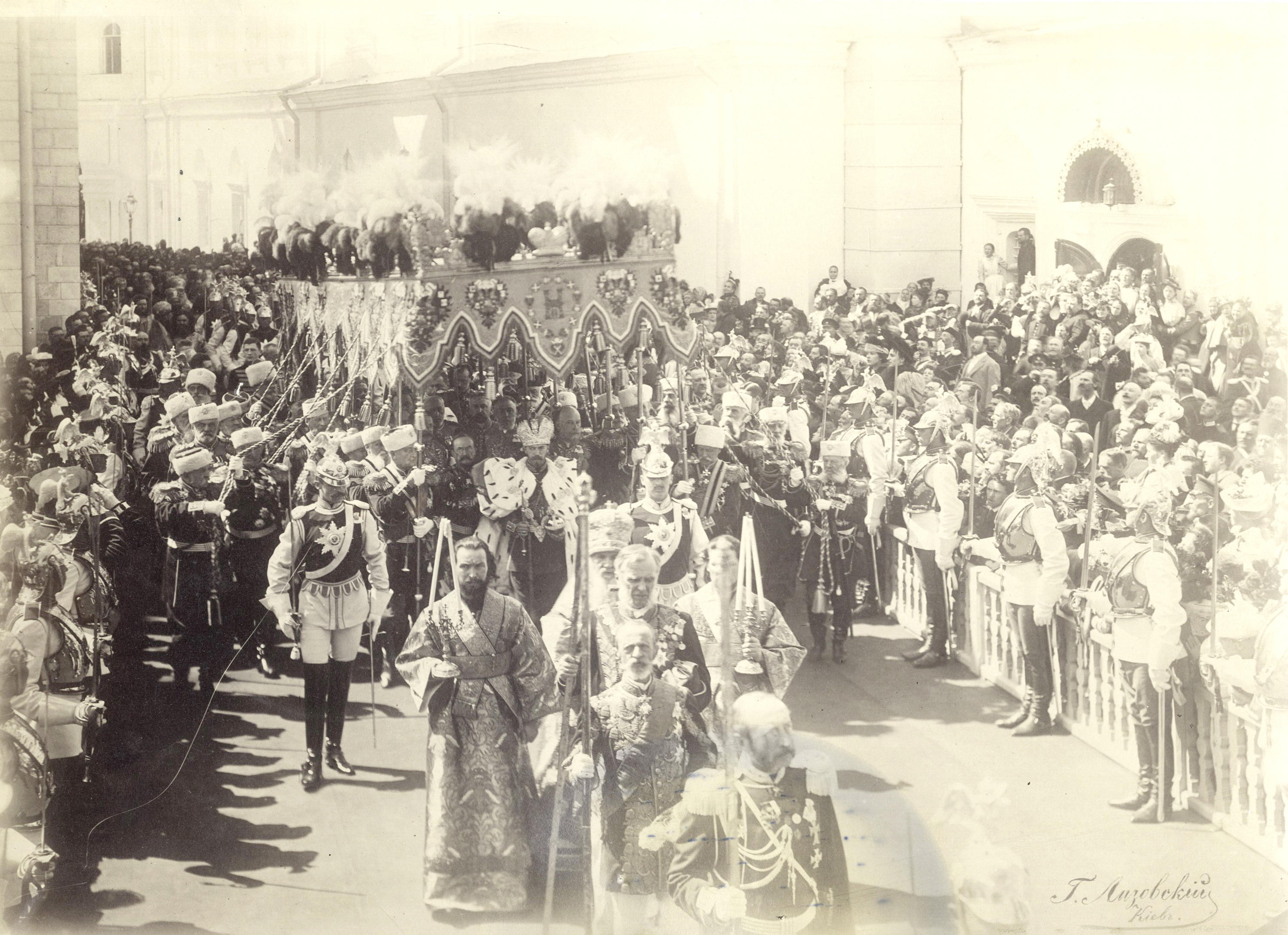
After his coronation, Nicholas II leaves Dormition Cathedral in Moscow

Alexander was succeeded by his son Nicholas II (1894–1918). The Industrial Revolution, which began to exert a significant influence in Russia, was meanwhile creating forces that would finally overthrow the tsar. Politically, these opposition forces organized into three competing parties: The liberal elements among the industrial capitalists and nobility, who wanted peaceful social reform and a constitutional monarchy, founded the Constitutional Democratic party or Kadets in 1905. Followers of the Narodnik tradition established the Socialist-Revolutionary Party or Esers in 1901, advocating the distribution of land among the peasants who worked it. A third radical group founded the Russian Social Democratic Labour Party or RSDLP in 1898; this party was the primary exponent of Marxism in Russia. Gathering their support from the radical intellectuals and the urban working class, they advocated complete social, economic and political revolution.

In 1903, the RSDLP split into two wings: the radical Bolsheviks, led by Vladimir Lenin, and the relatively moderate Mensheviks, led by Yuli Martov. The Mensheviks believed that Russian socialism would grow gradually and peacefully and that the tsar's regime should be succeeded by a democratic republic. The Bolsheviks advocated the formation of a small elite of professional revolutionaries, subject to strong party discipline, to act as the vanguard of the proletariat in order to seize power by force.

At the beginning of the 20th century, Russia continued its expansion in the Far East; Chinese Manchuria was in the zone of Russian interests. Russia took an active part in the intervention of the great powers in China to suppress the Boxer rebellion. During this war, Russia occupied Manchuria, which caused a clash of interests with Japan. In 1904, the Russo-Japanese War began, which ended extremely unfavourably for Russia.

=== Revolution of 1905 ===
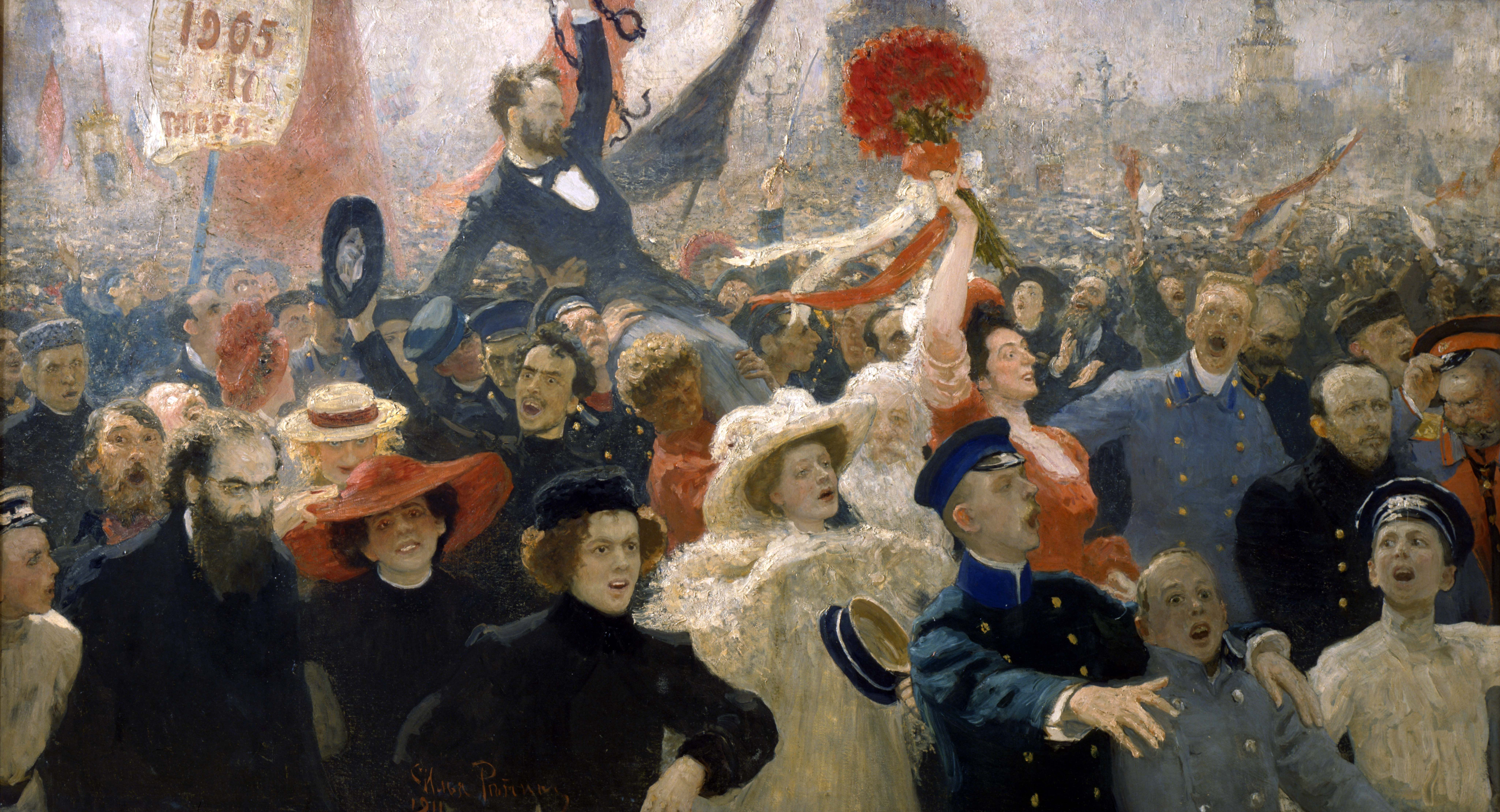
The October Manifesto granting civil liberties and establishing first parliament

The disastrous performance of the Russian armed forces in the Russo-Japanese War was a major blow to the Russian State and increased the potential for unrest.

In January 1905, an incident known as "Bloody Sunday" occurred when Father Gapon led an enormous crowd to the Winter Palace in Saint Petersburg to present a petition to the tsar. When the procession reached the palace, Cossacks opened fire, killing hundreds. The Russian masses were so aroused over the massacre that a general strike was declared demanding a democratic republic. This marked the beginning of the Russian Revolution of 1905. Soviets (councils of workers) appeared in most cities to direct revolutionary activity.

In October 1905, Nicholas reluctantly issued the October Manifesto, which conceded the creation of a national Duma (legislature) to be called without delay. The right to vote was extended, and no law was to go into force without confirmation by the Duma. The moderate groups were satisfied; but the socialists rejected the concessions as insufficient and tried to organize new strikes. By the end of 1905, there was disunity among the reformers, and the tsar's position was strengthened.

=== World War I ===
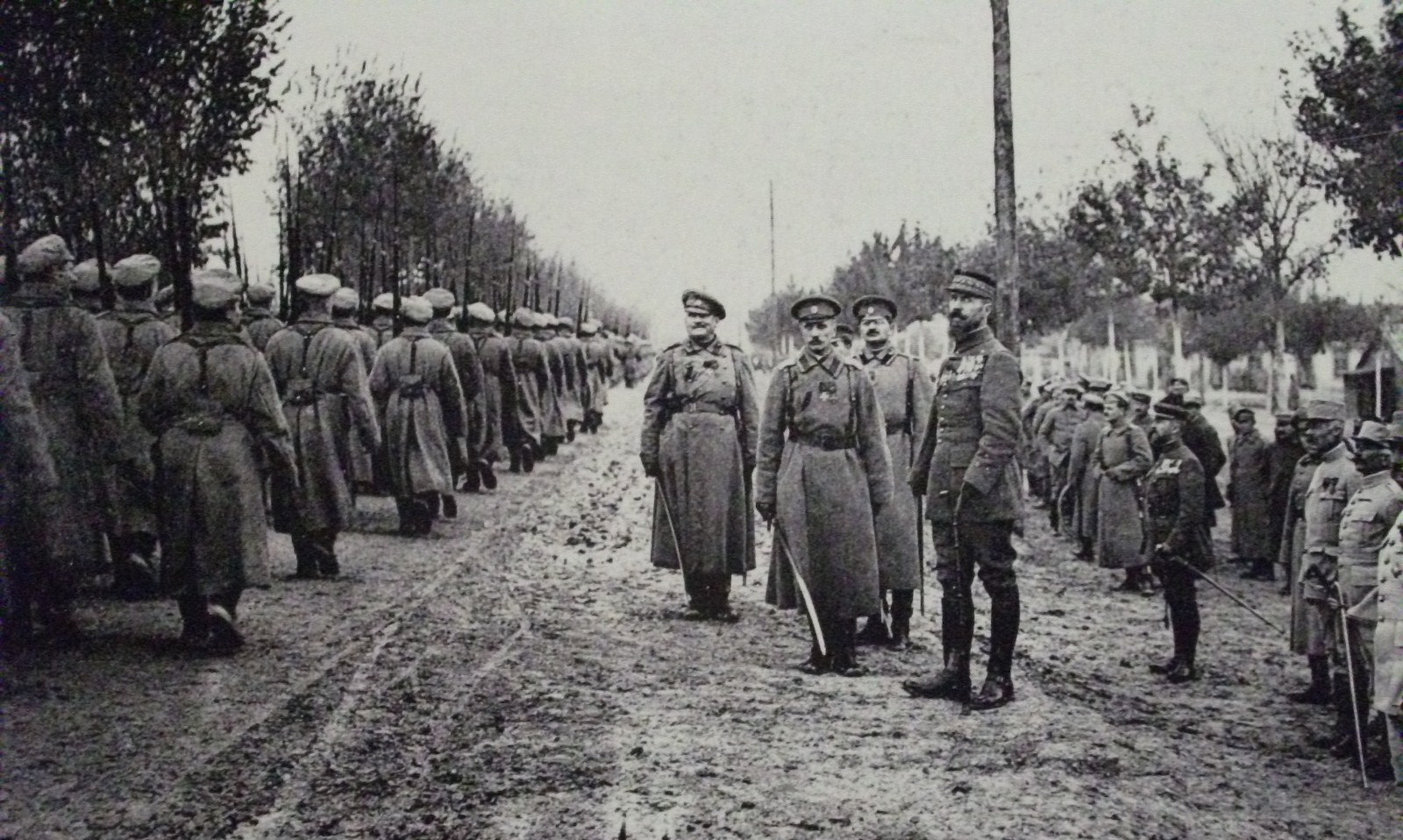
Russian Expeditionary Force in France, October 1916

On 28 June 1914, Archduke Franz Ferdinand of Austria was assassinated by Bosnian Serbs. Austro-Hungary issued an ultimatum to Serbia, which it considered a Russian client-state. Russia had no treaty obligation to Serbia, and most Russian leaders wanted to avoid war. But in that crisis they had the support of France, and believed that supporting Serbia was important for Russia's credibility and for its goal of a leadership role in the Balkans. Tsar Nicholas II mobilised Russian forces on 30 July 1914 to defend Serbia. Christopher Clark states: "The Russian general mobilisation [of 30 July] was one of the most momentous decisions of the July crisis". Germany responded with its own mobilisation and declaration of War on 1 August 1914. At the opening of hostilities, the Russians took the offensive against both Germany and Austria-Hungary.

The very large but poorly led and under-equipped Russian army fought tenaciously. Casualties were enormous. In the 1914 campaign, Russian forces defeated Austro-Hungarian forces in the Battle of Galicia. The success of the Russian army forced the German army to withdraw troops from the western front to the Russian front. However, victories in Poland by the Central Powers in the 1915 campaign, led to a major retreat of the Russian army. In 1916, the Russians again dealt a powerful blow to the Austrians during the Brusilov offensive.

By 1915, morale was worsening. Many recruits were sent to the front unarmed. Nevertheless, the Russian army fought on, and tied down large numbers of Germans and Austrians. When the homefront showed an occasional surge of patriotism, the tsar and his entourage failed to exploit it for military benefit. The Russian army neglected to rally the ethnic and religious minorities that were hostile to Austria, such as Poles. The tsar refused to cooperate with the national legislature, the Duma, and listened less to experts than to his wife, who was in thrall to her chief advisor, the holy man Grigori Rasputin. More than two million refugees fled. Repeated military failures and bureaucratic ineptitude soon turned large segments of the population against the government. The German and Ottoman fleets prevented Russia from importing urgently needed supplies through the Baltic and Black seas. By mid-1915 the impact of the war was demoralizing. Food and fuel were in short supply, casualties kept occurring, and inflation was mounting. Strikes increased among factory workers, and the peasants, who wanted land reforms, were restless. Meanwhile, elite distrust of the regime was deepened by reports that Rasputin was gaining influence; his assassination in late 1916 ended the scandal but did not restore the autocracy's prestige.

== Russian Civil War (1917–1922) ==
=== Russian Revolution ===
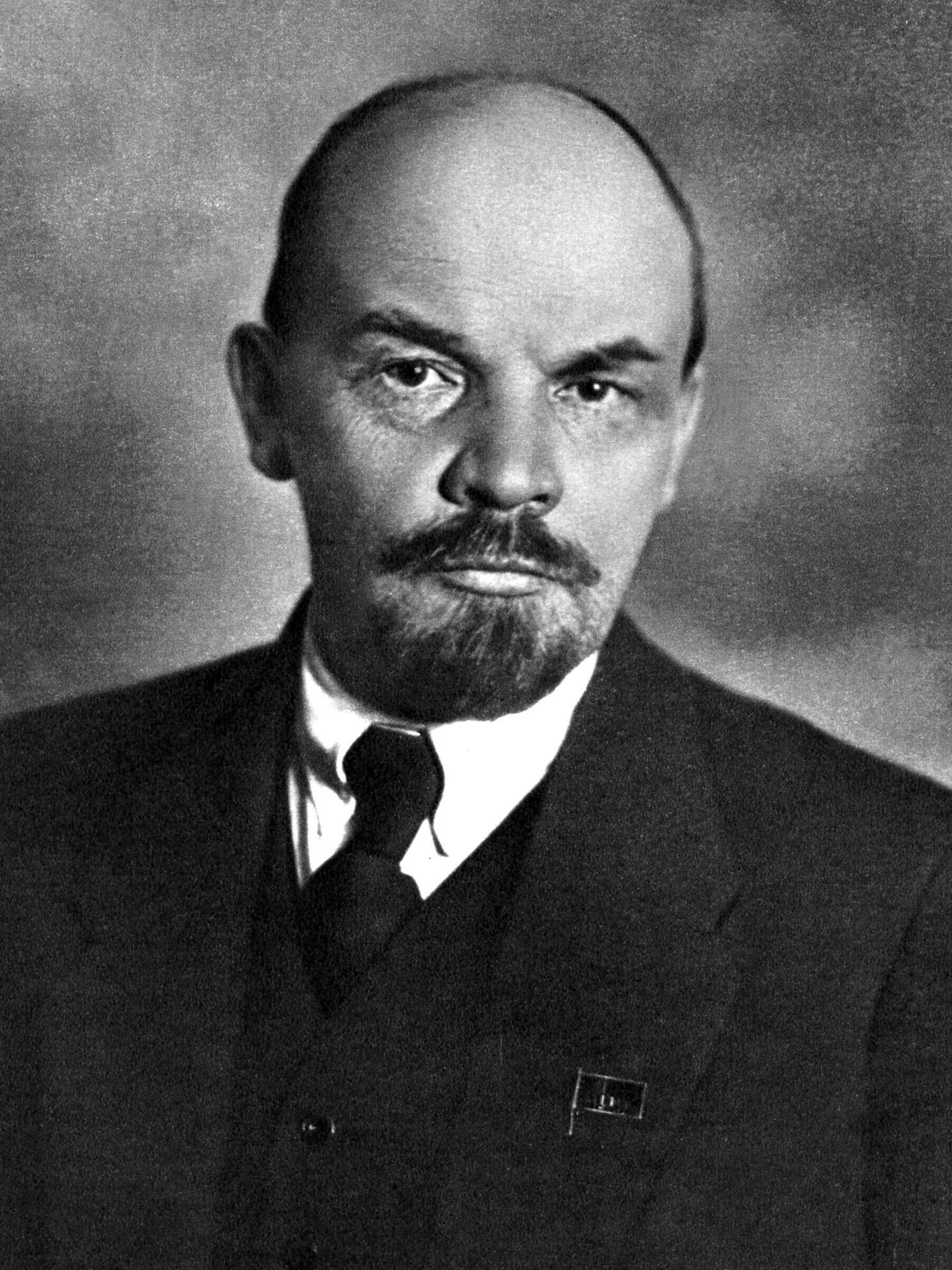
Vladimir Lenin, founder of the Soviet Union and the leader of the Bolshevik party.

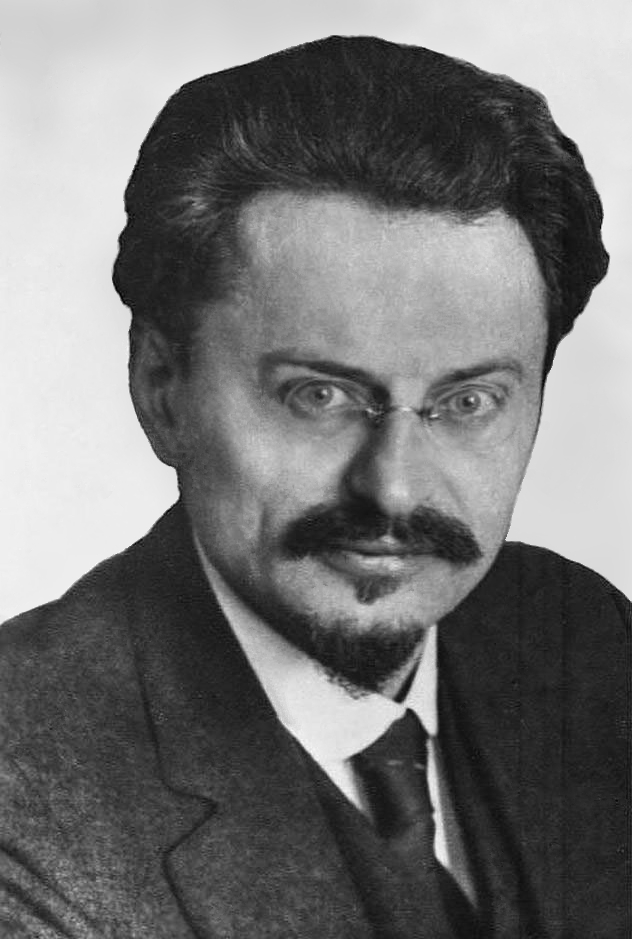
Leon Trotsky, founder of the Red Army and a key figure in the October Revolution.

In late February (3 March 1917), a strike occurred in a factory in the capital Petrograd (Saint Petersburg). On 23 February (8 March) 1917, thousands of female textile workers walked out of their factories protesting the lack of food and calling on other workers to join them. Within days, nearly all the workers in the city were idle, and street fighting broke out. The tsar ordered the Duma to disband, ordered strikers to return to work, and ordered troops to shoot at demonstrators in the streets. His orders triggered the February Revolution, especially when soldiers sided with the strikers. On 2 March, Nicholas II abdicated.

To fill the vacuum of authority, the Duma declared a Provisional Government, headed by Prince Lvov, which was collectively known as the Russian Republic. Meanwhile, the socialists in Petrograd organized elections among workers and soldiers to form a soviet (council) of workers' and soldiers' deputies, as an organ of popular power that could pressure the "bourgeois" Provisional Government.

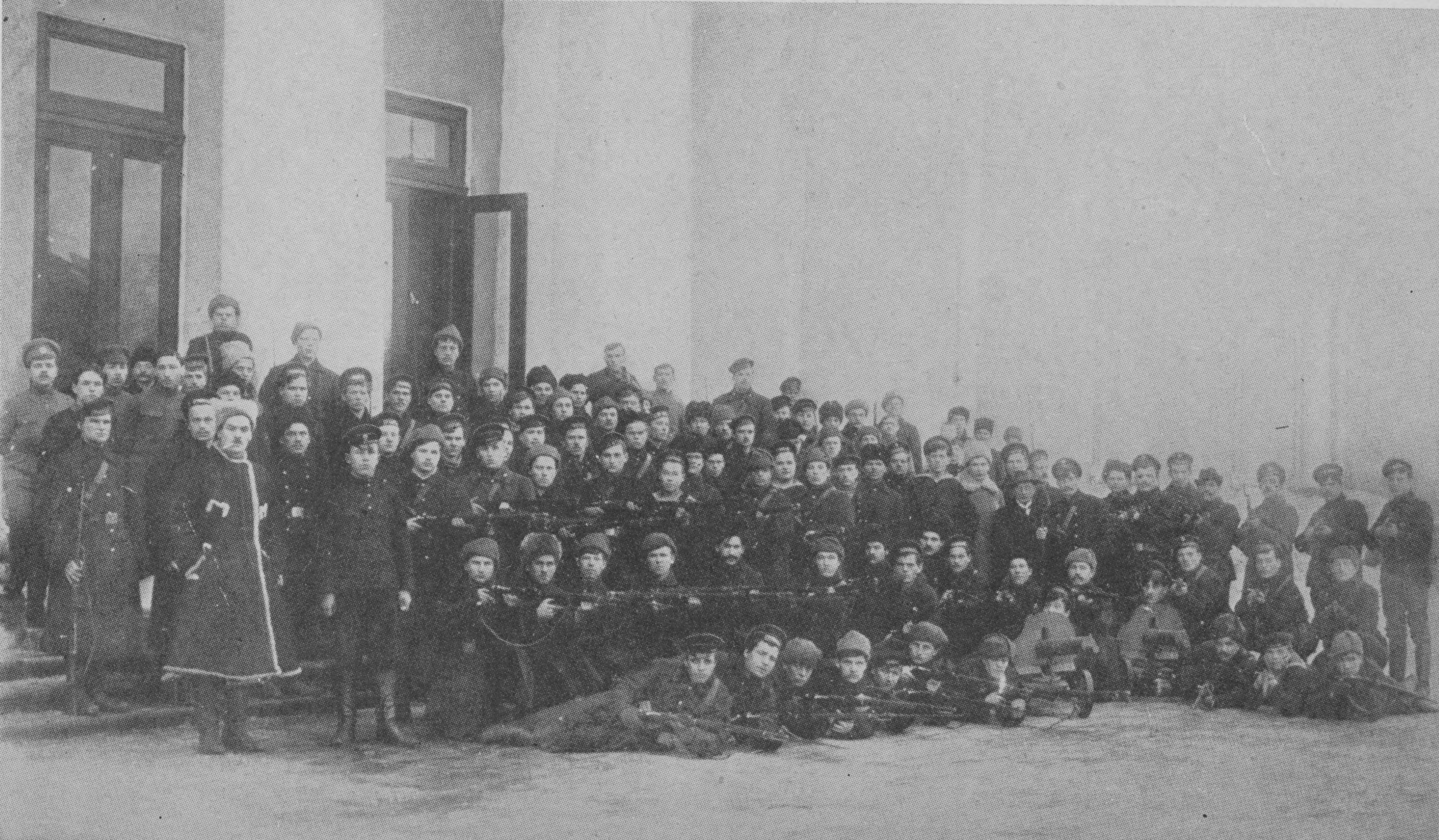
A detachment of Red Guard sailors who dissolved the Constituent Assembly

In July, following a series of crises that undermined their authority with the public, the head of the Provisional Government resigned and was succeeded by Alexander Kerensky, who was more progressive than his predecessor but not radical enough for the Bolsheviks or many Russians discontented with the deepening economic crisis and the war. The socialist-led soviet in Petrograd joined with soviets that formed throughout the country to create a national movement.

The German government provided over 40 million gold marks to subsidize Bolshevik publications and activities subversive of the tsarist government, especially focusing on disgruntled soldiers and workers. In April 1917 Germany provided a special sealed train to carry Vladimir Lenin back to Russia from his exile in Switzerland. After many behind-the-scenes maneuvers, the soviets seized control of the government in November 1917 and drove Kerensky and his moderate provisional government into exile, in the events that would become known as the October Revolution.

Bolshevik figures such as Anatoly Lunacharsky, Moisei Uritsky and Dmitry Manuilsky agreed that Lenin’s influence on the Bolshevik party was decisive but the October insurrection was carried out according to Trotsky’s, not to Lenin’s plan.

When the national Constituent Assembly (elected in December 1917) refused to become a rubber stamp of the Bolsheviks, it was dissolved by Lenin's troops and all vestiges of democracy were removed. With the handicap of the moderate opposition removed, Lenin was able to free his regime from the war problem by the harsh Treaty of Brest-Litovsk (1918) with Germany. Russia lost much of her western borderlands. However, when Germany was defeated the Soviet government repudiated the Treaty.

=== Russian Civil War ===
Russian Civil War in the European part of Russia

The Bolshevik grip on power was by no means secure, and a lengthy struggle broke out between the new regime and its opponents, which included the Socialist Revolutionaries, the anti-Bolshevik White movement, and large numbers of peasants. At the same time the Allied powers sent several expeditionary armies to support the anti-Communist forces in an attempt to force Russia to rejoin the world war. The Bolsheviks fought against both these forces and national independence movements in the former Russian Empire. By 1921, they had defeated their internal enemies and brought most of the newly independent states under their control, with the exception of Finland, the Baltic States, the Moldavian Democratic Republic (which elected to unite with Romania), and Poland (with whom they had fought the Polish–Soviet War). Finland also annexed the region Pechenga of the Russian Kola Peninsula; Soviet Russia and allied Soviet republics conceded the parts of its territory to Estonia (Petseri County and Estonian Ingria), Latvia (Pytalovo), and Turkey (Kars). Poland incorporated the contested territories of Western Belarus and Western Ukraine, the former parts of the Russian Empire (except Galicia) east to Curzon Line.

Both sides regularly committed brutal atrocities against civilians. During the civil war era for example, Petlyura and Denikin's forces massacred 100,000 to 150,000 Jews in Ukraine and southern Russia. Hundreds of thousands of Jews were left homeless and tens of thousands became victims of serious illness. These massacres are now referred to as the White Terror (Russia).

Estimates for the total number of people killed during the Red Terror carried out by the Bolsheviks vary widely. One source asserts that the total number of victims could be 1.3 million, whereas others give estimates ranging from 10,000 in the initial period of repression to 140,000 and an estimate of 28,000 executions per year from December 1917 to February 1922. The most reliable estimations for the total number of killings put the number at about 100,000, whereas others suggest a figure of 200,000.

The Russian economy was devastated by the war, with factories and bridges destroyed, cattle and raw materials pillaged, mines flooded and machines damaged. The droughts of 1920 and 1921, as well as the 1921 famine, worsened the disaster still further. Disease had reached pandemic proportions, with 3,000,000 dying of typhus alone in 1920. Millions more also died of widespread starvation. By 1922 there were at least 7,000,000 street children in Russia as a result of nearly ten years of devastation from the Great War and the civil war. Another one to two million people, known as the White émigrés, fled Russia, many were evacuated from Crimea in the 1920, some through the Far East, others west into the newly independent Baltic countries. These émigrés included a large percentage of the educated and skilled population.

== Soviet Union (1922–1991) ==
=== Creation of the Soviet Union ===
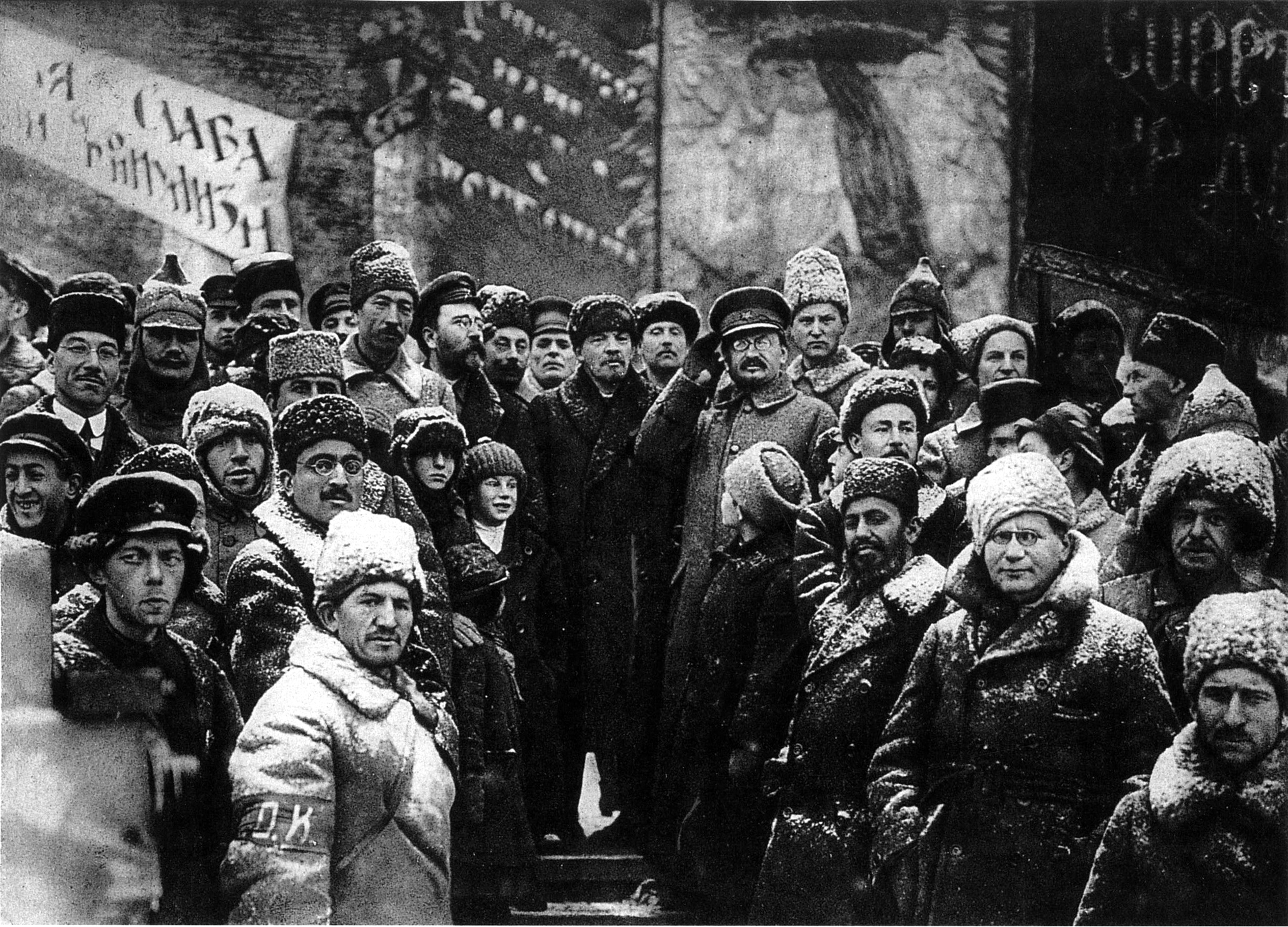
Lenin, Trotsky and Kamenev celebrating the second anniversary of the October Revolution

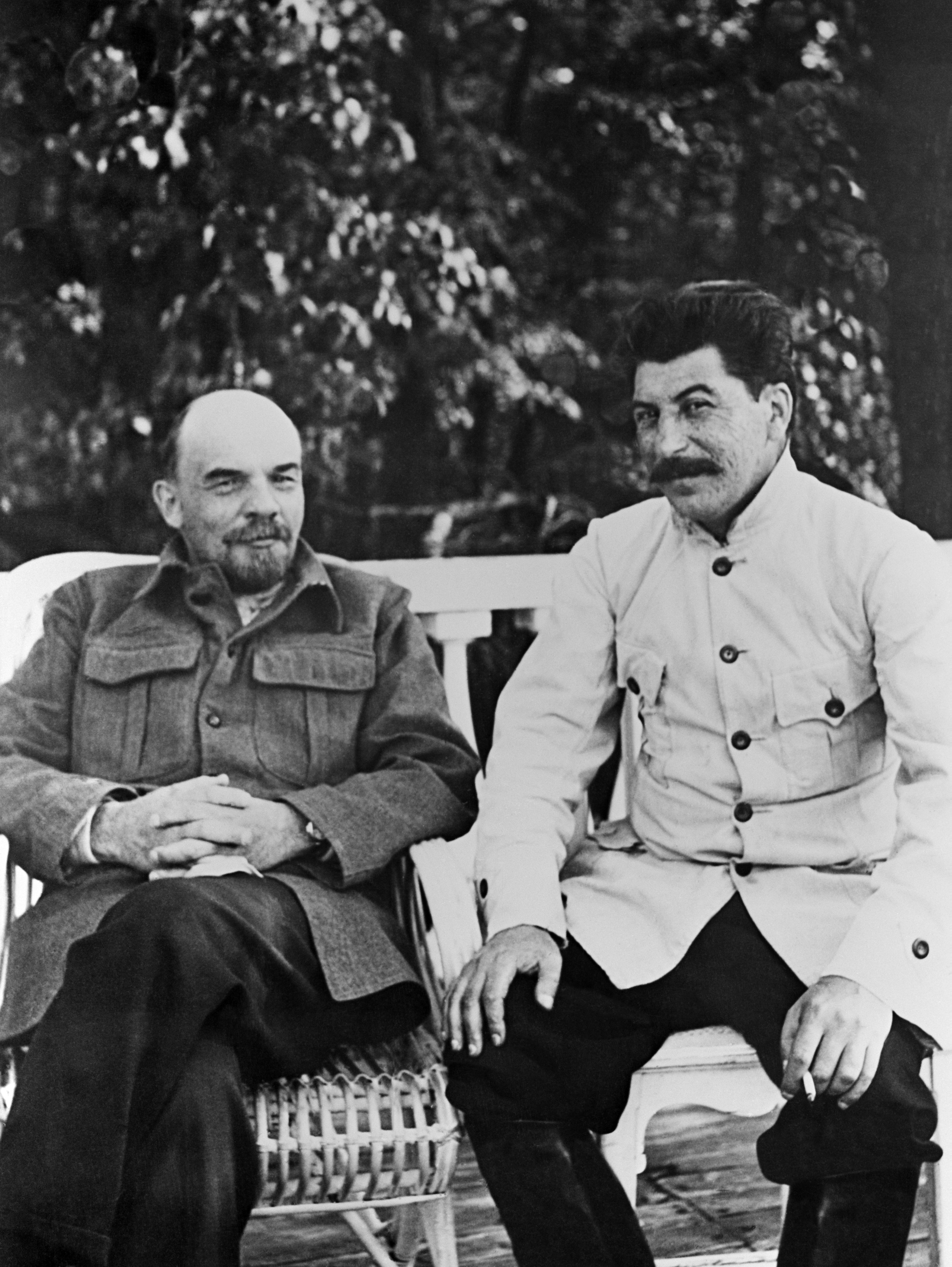
Lenin and Stalin at Gorki (1922)

The Soviet Union, established in December 1922 by the leaders of the Russian Communist Party, was roughly coterminous with Russia before the Treaty of Brest-Litovsk. At that time, the new nation included four constituent republics: the Russian SFSR, the Ukrainian SSR, the Belarusian SSR, and the Transcaucasian SFSR.

The constitution, adopted in 1924, established a federal system of government based on a pyramid of soviets in each constituent republic which culminated in the All-Union Congress of Soviets. However, while it appeared that the congress exercised sovereign power, this body was actually governed by the Communist Party, which in turn was controlled by the Politburo from Moscow.

=== War Communism and the New Economic Policy ===
The period from the consolidation of the Bolshevik Revolution in 1917 until 1921 is known as the period of war communism. Land, all industry, and small businesses were nationalized, and the money economy was restricted. Strong opposition soon developed. The peasants wanted cash payments for their products and resented having to surrender their surplus grain to the government as a part of its civil war policies. Confronted with peasant opposition, Lenin began a strategic retreat from war communism known as the New Economic Policy (NEP). The peasants were freed from wholesale levies of grain and allowed to sell their surplus produce in the open market. Commerce was stimulated by permitting private retail trading. The state continued to be responsible for banking, transportation, heavy industry, and public utilities.

Although the left opposition among the Communists criticized the rich peasants, or kulaks, who benefited from the NEP, the program proved highly beneficial and the economy revived. The NEP would later come under increasing opposition from within the party following Lenin's death in early 1924.

=== Changes to Russian society ===
Soviet poster from 1932 symbolizing the reform of "old ways of life", dedicated to liberation of women from traditional roles

As the Russian Empire included during this period not only the region of Russia, but also today's territories of Ukraine, Belarus, Poland, Lithuania, Estonia, Latvia, Finland, Moldavia and the Caucasian and Central Asian countries, it is possible to examine the firm formation process in all those regions. One of the main determinants of firm creation for given regions of Russian Empire might be urban demand of goods and supply of industrial and organizational skill.

While the Russian economy was being transformed, the social life of the people underwent equally drastic changes. The Family Code of 1918 granted women equal status to men, and permitted a couple to take either the husband or wife's name. Divorce no longer required court procedure, and to make women completely free of the responsibilities of childbearing, abortion was made legal as early as 1920. As a side effect, the emancipation of women increased the labor market. Girls were encouraged to secure an education and pursue a career. Communal nurseries were set up for child care, and efforts were made to shift the center of people's social life from the home to educational and recreational groups, the soviet clubs.

The Soviet government pursued a policy of eliminating illiteracy (Likbez). After industrialization, massive urbanization began. In the field of national policy in the 1920s, the Korenizatsiya was carried out. However, from the mid-30s, the Stalinist government returned to the tsarist policy of Russification of the outskirts. In particular, the languages of all the nations of the USSR were transcribed into the Cyrillic alphabet in the process known as Cyrillization.

=== Industrialization and collectivization ===
The years from 1929 to 1939 comprised a tumultuous decade in Soviet history—a period of massive industrialization and internal struggles as Joseph Stalin established near total control over Soviet society, wielding virtually unrestrained power. Following Lenin's death Stalin wrestled to gain control of the Soviet Union with rival factions in the Politburo, especially Leon Trotsky's. By 1928, with the Trotskyists either exiled or rendered powerless, Stalin was ready to put a radical programme of industrialisation into action.

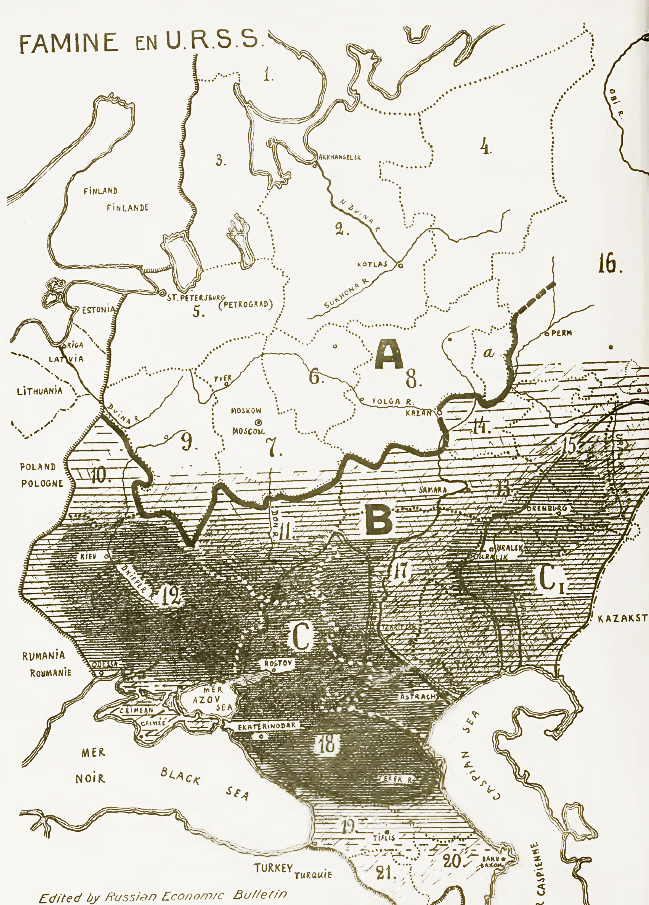
The Soviet famine of 1932–1933, with areas where the effects of famine were most severe shaded

In 1929, Stalin proposed the first five-year plan. Abolishing the NEP, it was the first of a number of plans aimed at swift accumulation of capital resources through the buildup of heavy industry, the collectivization of agriculture, and the restricted manufacture of consumer goods. For the first time in history a government controlled all economic activity. The rapid growth of production capacity and the volume of production of heavy industry was of great importance for ensuring economic independence from western countries and strengthening the country's defense capability. At this time, the Soviet Union made the transition from an agrarian country to an industrial one.

As a part of the plan, the government took control of agriculture through the state and collective farms (kolkhozes). By a decree of February 1930, about one million individual peasants (kulaks) were forced off their land. Many peasants strongly opposed regimentation by the state, often slaughtering their herds when faced with the loss of their land. In some sections they revolted, and countless peasants deemed "kulaks" by the authorities were executed. The combination of bad weather, deficiencies of the hastily established collective farms, and massive confiscation of grain precipitated a serious famine, and several million peasants died of starvation, mostly in Ukraine, Kazakhstan and parts of southwestern Russia. The deteriorating conditions in the countryside drove millions of desperate peasants to the rapidly growing cities, fueling industrialization, and vastly increasing Russia's urban population.

=== Stalinist repression ===
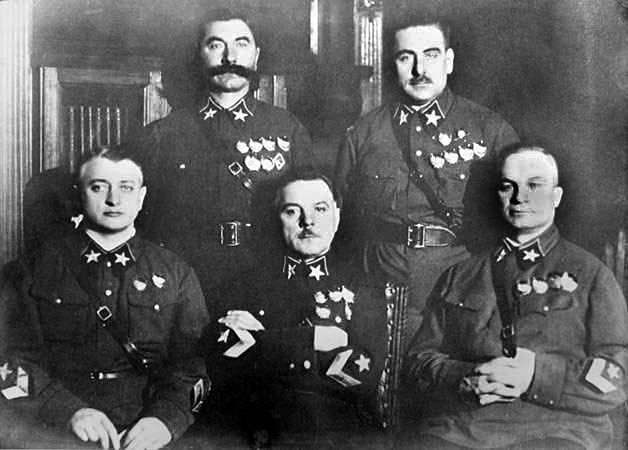
The first five Marshals of the Soviet Union in November 1935, clockwise from top left: Semyon Budyonny, Vasily Blyukher, Alexander Ilyich Yegorov, Kliment Voroshilov, and Mikhail Tukhachevsky. Only Budyonny and Voroshilov would survive Stalin's Great Purge.

The NKVD gathered in tens of thousands of Soviet citizens to face arrest, deportation, or execution. Of the six original members of the 1920 Politburo who survived Lenin, all were purged by Stalin. Old Bolsheviks who had been loyal comrades of Lenin, high officers in the Red Army, and directors of industry were liquidated in the Great Purges. Purges in other Soviet republics also helped centralize control in the USSR.

Stalin destroyed the opposition in the party consisting of the old Bolsheviks during the Moscow trials. The NKVD under the leadership of Stalin's commissar Nikolai Yezhov carried out a series of massive repressive operations against the kulaks and various national minorities in the USSR. During the Great Purges of 1937–38, about 700,000 people were executed.

Penalties were introduced, and many citizens were prosecuted for fictitious crimes of sabotage and espionage. The labor provided by convicts working in the labor camps of the Gulag system became an important component of the industrialization effort, especially in Siberia. An estimated 18 million people passed through the Gulag system, and perhaps another 15 million had experience of some other form of forced labor.

After the partition of Poland in 1939, the NKVD executed 20,000 captured Polish officers in the Katyn massacre. In the late 30s - first half of the 40s, the Stalinist government carried out massive deportations of various nationalities. A number of ethnic groups were deported from their settlement to Central Asia.

=== Soviet Union on the international stage ===
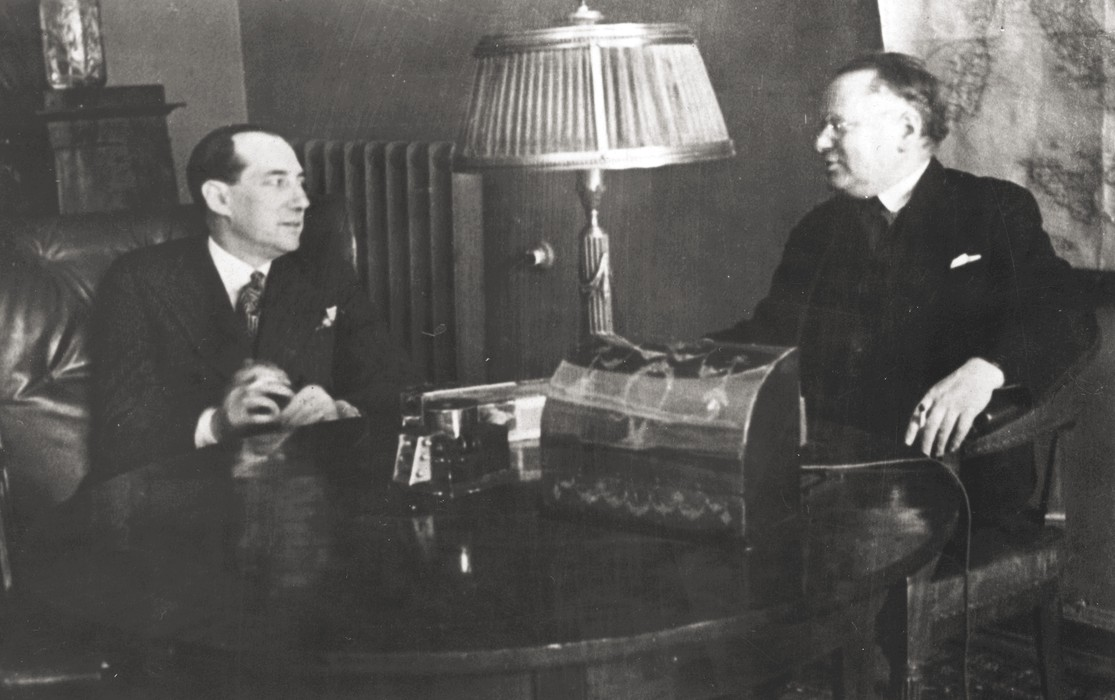
Soviet Foreign Minister Maxim Litvinov with Poland's Foreign Minister Józef Beck in February 1934

The Soviet Union viewed the 1933 accession of fervently anti-Communist Hitler to power in Germany with alarm, especially since Hitler proclaimed the Drang nach Osten as one of the major objectives in his vision of the German strategy of Lebensraum. The Soviets supported the republicans of Spain who struggled against fascist German and Italian troops in the Spanish Civil War. In 1938–1939, the Soviet Union successfully fought against Imperial Japan in the Soviet–Japanese border conflicts in the Russian Far East, which led to Soviet-Japanese neutrality and the tense border peace that lasted until August 1945.

In 1938, Germany annexed Austria and, together with major Western European powers, signed the Munich Agreement following which Germany, Hungary and Poland divided parts of Czechoslovakia between themselves. German plans for further eastward expansion, as well as the lack of resolve from Western powers to oppose it, became more apparent. Despite the Soviet Union strongly opposing the Munich deal and repeatedly reaffirming its readiness to militarily back commitments given earlier to Czechoslovakia, the Western Betrayal led to the end of Czechoslovakia and further increased fears in the Soviet Union of a coming German attack. This led the Soviet Union to rush the modernization of its military industry and to carry out its own diplomatic maneuvers. In 1939, the Soviet Union signed the Molotov–Ribbentrop Pact: a non-aggression pact with Nazi Germany dividing Eastern Europe into two separate spheres of influence. Following the pact, the USSR normalized relations with Nazi Germany and resumed Soviet–German trade.

=== World War II ===
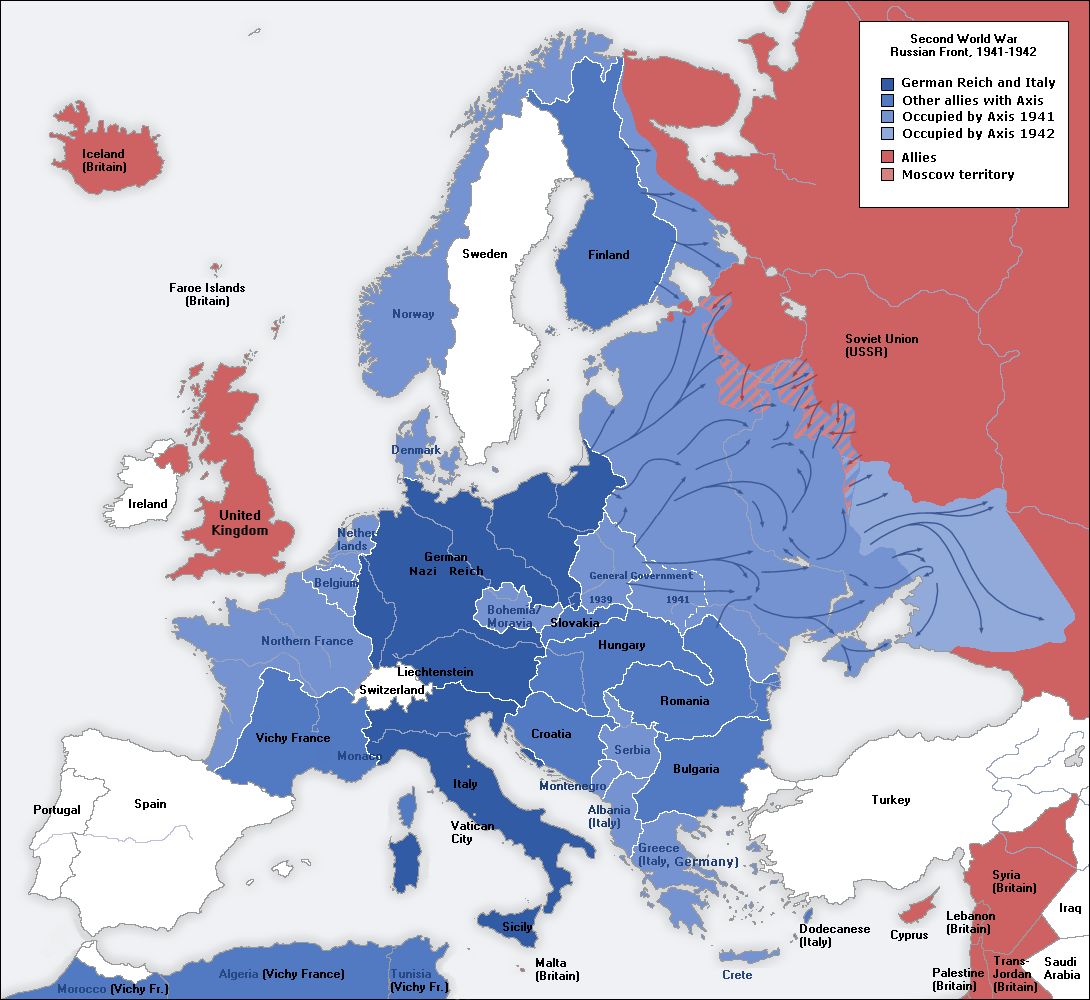
German invasion of the Soviet Union in 1941 and 1942

On 17 September 1939, the Red Army invaded eastern Poland, stating as justification the "need to protect Ukrainians and Belarusians" there, after the "cessation of existence" of the Polish state. As a result, the Belarusian and Ukrainian Soviet republics' western borders were moved westward, and the new Soviet western border was drawn close to the original Curzon line. In the meantime negotiations with Finland over a Soviet-proposed land swap that would redraw the Soviet-Finnish border further away from Leningrad failed, and in December 1939 the USSR invaded Finland, beginning a campaign known as the Winter War (1939–1940), with the goal of annexing Finland into the Soviet Union. The war took a heavy death toll on the Red Army and the Soviets failed to conquer Finland, but forced Finland to sign the Moscow Peace Treaty and cede the Karelian Isthmus and Ladoga Karelia. In summer 1940 the USSR issued an ultimatum to Romania forcing it to cede the territories of Bessarabia and Northern Bukovina. At the same time, the Soviet Union also occupied the three formerly independent Baltic states (Estonia, Latvia and Lithuania).

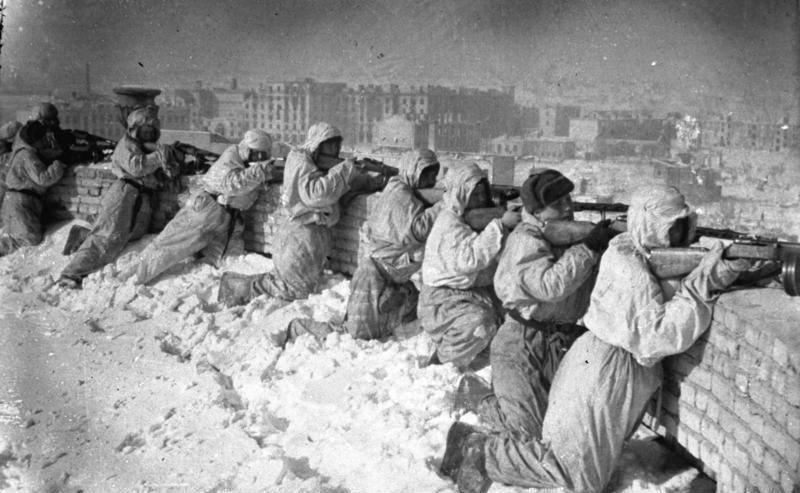
Soviet soldiers during the Battle of Stalingrad, the largest and bloodiest battle in the history of warfare, the turning point on the Eastern Front and in the entire WWII

The peace with Germany was tense, as both sides were preparing for the military conflict, and abruptly ended when the Axis forces led by Germany swept across the Soviet border on 22 June 1941. By the autumn the German army had seized Ukraine, laid a siege of Leningrad, and threatened to capture the capital, Moscow, itself. Despite the fact that in December 1941 the Red Army threw off the German forces from Moscow in a successful counterattack, the Germans retained the strategic initiative for approximately another year and held a deep offensive in the south-eastern direction, reaching the Volga and the Caucasus. However, two major German defeats in Stalingrad and Kursk proved decisive and reversed the course of the entire World War as the Germans never regained the strength to sustain their offensive operations and the Soviet Union recaptured the initiative for the rest of the conflict. By the end of 1943, the Red Army had broken through the German siege of Leningrad and liberated much of Ukraine, much of Western Russia and moved into Belarus. During the 1944 campaign, the Red Army defeated German forces in a series of offensive campaigns known as Stalin's ten blows. By the end of 1944, the front had moved beyond the 1939 Soviet frontiers into eastern Europe. Soviet forces drove into eastern Germany, capturing Berlin in May 1945. The war with Germany thus ended triumphantly for the Soviet Union.

As agreed at the Yalta Conference, three months after the Victory Day in Europe the USSR launched the Soviet invasion of Manchuria, defeating the Japanese troops in neighboring Manchuria, the last Soviet battle of World War II.

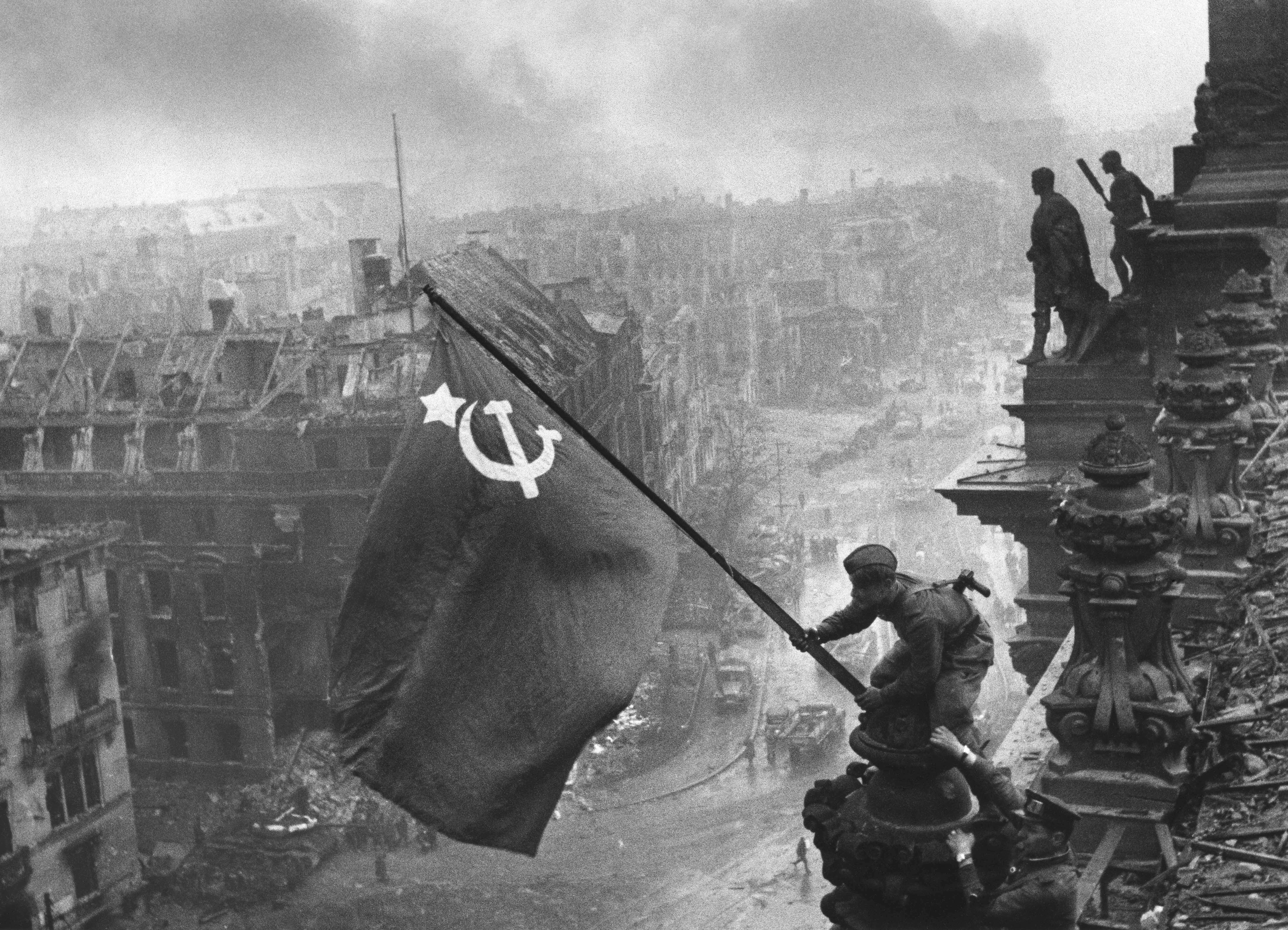
Raising a Flag over the Reichstag

Although the Soviet Union was victorious in World War II, the war resulted in around 26–27 million Soviet deaths (estimates vary) and had devastated the Soviet economy in the struggle. Some 70,000 settlements were destroyed. The occupied territories suffered from the ravages of German occupation and deportations of slave labor by Germany. Thirteen million Soviet citizens became victims of the repressive policies of Germany and its allies in occupied territories, where people died because of mass murders, famine, absence of medical aid and slave labor. The Holocaust, carried out by German Einsatzgruppen along with local collaborators, resulted in almost complete annihilation of the Jewish population over the entire territory temporarily occupied by Germany and its allies. During the occupation, the Leningrad region lost around a quarter of its population, Soviet Belarus lost from a quarter to a third of its population, and 3.6 million Soviet prisoners of war (of 5.5 million) died in German camps.

=== Cold War ===
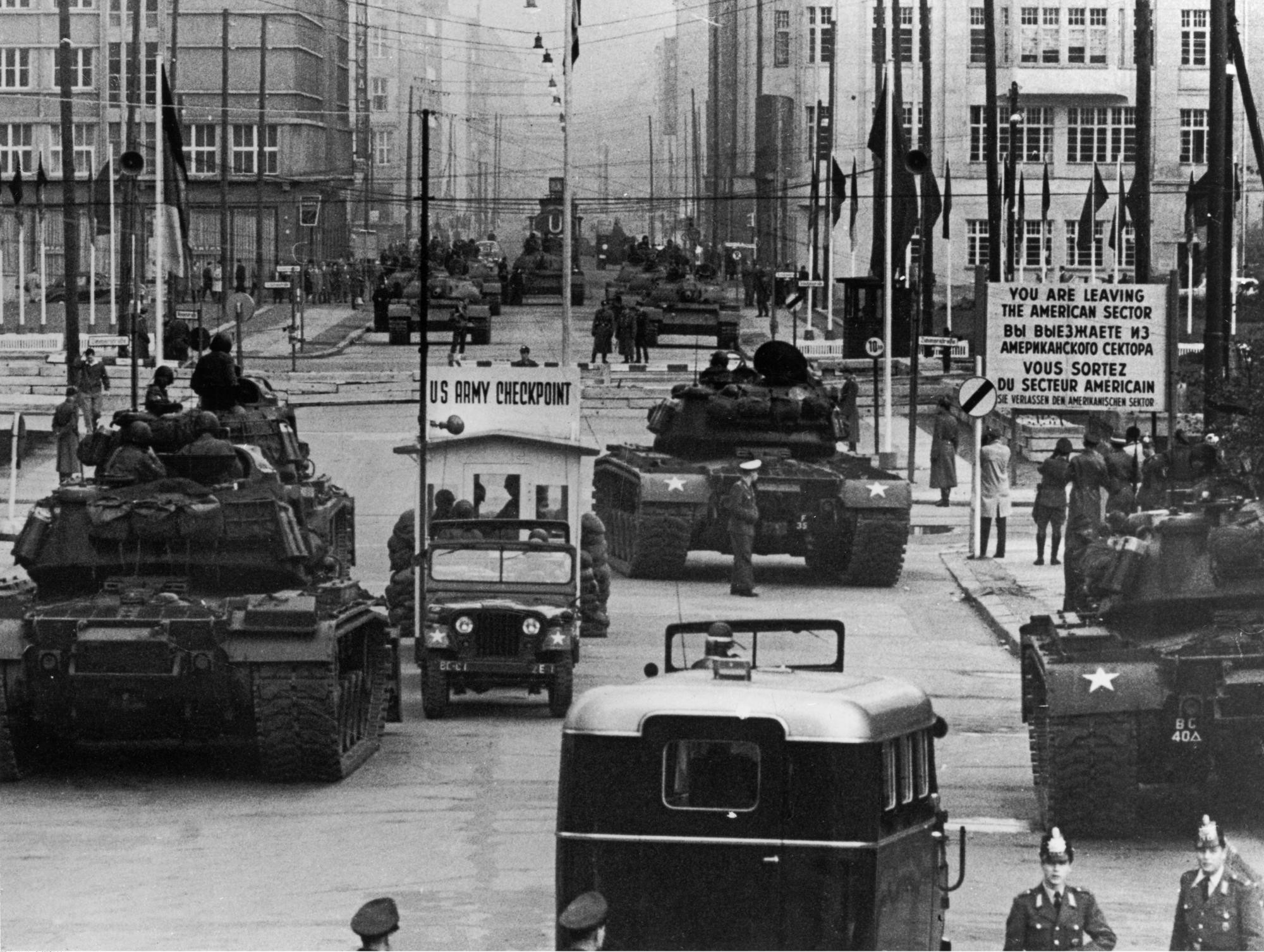
US Army tanks face off against Soviet armor at Checkpoint Charlie, Berlin, October 1961.

Collaboration among the major Allies had won the war and was supposed to serve as the basis for postwar reconstruction and security. USSR became one of the founders of the UN and a permanent member of the UN Security Council. However, the conflict between Soviet and U.S. national interests, known as the Cold War, came to dominate the international stage.

The Cold War emerged from a conflict between Stalin and U.S. President Harry Truman over the future of Eastern Europe during the Potsdam Conference in the summer of 1945. Stalin's goal was to establish a buffer zone of states between Germany and the Soviet Union. Truman charged that Stalin had betrayed the Yalta agreement. With Eastern Europe under Red Army occupation, Stalin was also biding his time, as his own atomic bomb project was steadily and secretly progressing.

In April 1949 the United States sponsored the North Atlantic Treaty Organization (NATO), a mutual defense pact. The Soviet Union established an Eastern counterpart to NATO in 1955, dubbed the Warsaw Pact. The division of Europe into Western and Soviet blocks later took on a more global character, especially after 1949, when the U.S. nuclear monopoly ended with the testing of a Soviet bomb and the Communist takeover in China.

The foremost objectives of Soviet foreign policy were the maintenance and enhancement of national security and the maintenance of hegemony over Eastern Europe. The Soviet Union maintained its dominance over the Warsaw Pact through crushing the Hungarian Revolution of 1956, suppressing the Prague Spring in Czechoslovakia in 1968, and supporting the suppression of the Solidarity movement in Poland in the early 1980s. The Soviet Union opposed the United States in a number of proxy conflicts all over the world, including the Korean War and Vietnam War.

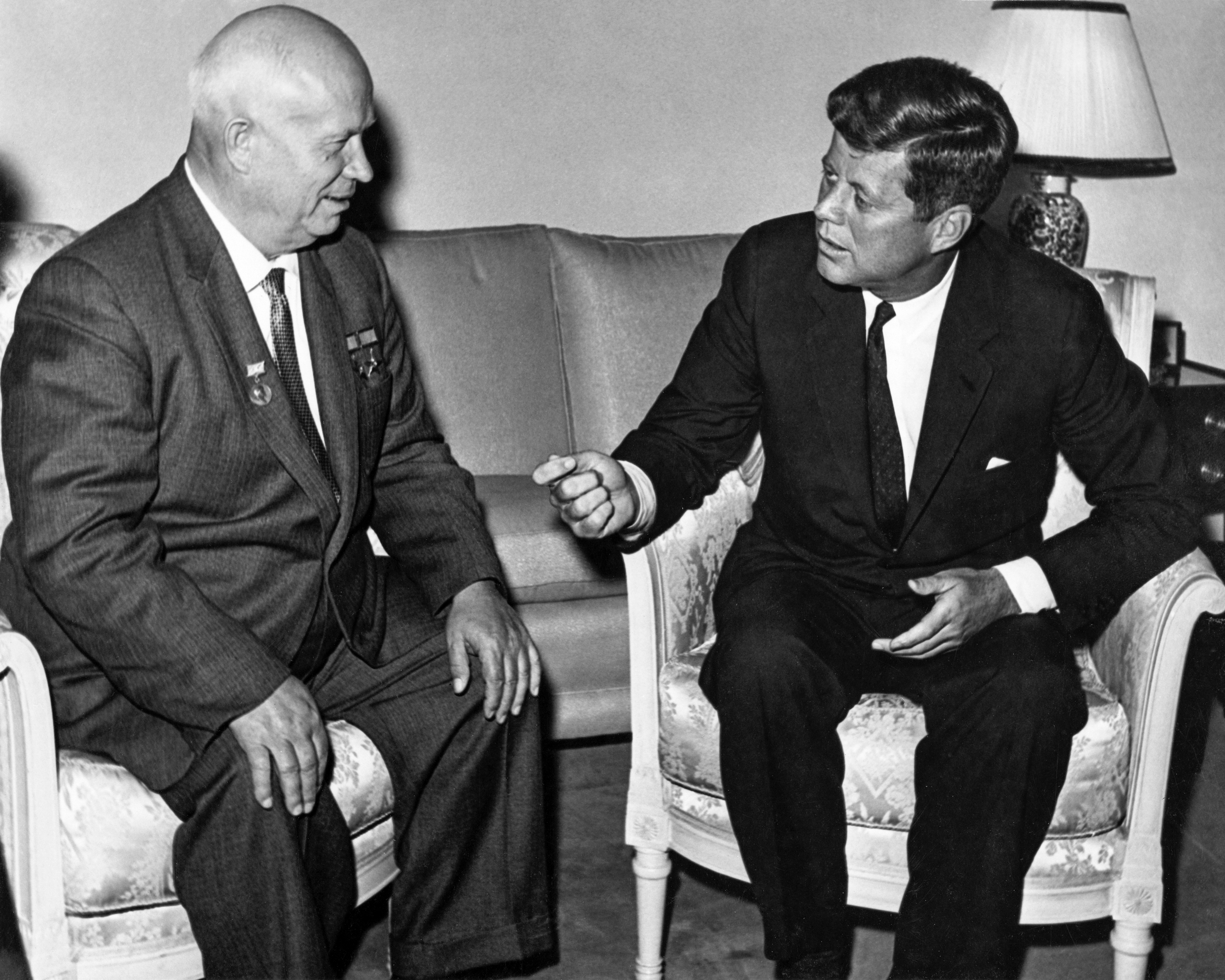
Nikita Khrushchev and John F. Kennedy, Vienna, June 1961

As the Soviet Union continued to maintain tight control over its sphere of influence in Eastern Europe, the Cold War gave way to Détente and a more complicated pattern of international relations in the 1970s. The nuclear race continued, the number of nuclear weapons in the hands of the USSR and the United States reached a menacing scale, giving them the ability to destroy the planet multiple times. Less powerful countries had more room to assert their independence, and the two superpowers were partially able to recognize their common interest in trying to check the further spread and proliferation of nuclear weapons in treaties such as SALT I, SALT II, and the Anti-Ballistic Missile Treaty.

U.S.–Soviet relations deteriorated following the beginning of the nine-year Soviet–Afghan War in 1979 and the 1980 election of Ronald Reagan, a staunch anti-communist, but improved as the communist bloc started to unravel in the late 1980s. With the collapse of the Soviet Union in 1991, Russia lost the superpower status that it had won in the Second World War.

=== De-Stalinization and the era of stagnation ===
Nikita Khrushchev solidified his position in a speech before the Twentieth Congress of the Communist Party in 1956 detailing Stalin's atrocities.

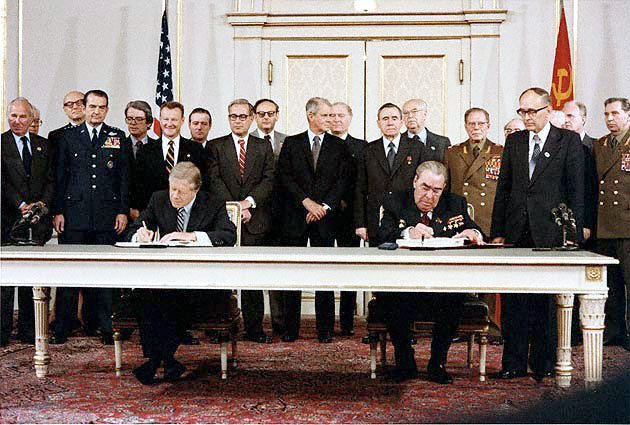
President Jimmy Carter and Soviet General Secretary Leonid Brezhnev sign the Strategic Arms Limitation Talks (SALT II) treaty, 18 June 1979.

In 1964, Khrushchev was impeached by the Communist Party's Central Committee, charging him with a host of errors that included Soviet setbacks such as the Cuban Missile Crisis. After a period of collective leadership led by Leonid Brezhnev, Alexei Kosygin and Nikolai Podgorny, Brezhnev took Khrushchev's place as Soviet leader. Brezhnev emphasized heavy industry, instituted the Soviet economic reform of 1965, and also attempted to ease relationships with the United States. Soviet science and industry peaked in the Khrushchev and Brezhnev years. The world's first nuclear power plant was established in 1954 in Obninsk, and the Baikal Amur Mainline was built. In the 1950s the USSR became a leading producer and exporter of petroleum and natural gas. In 1980 Moscow hosted the Summer Olympic Games.

While all modernized economies were rapidly moving to computerization after 1965, the USSR fell behind. Moscow's decision to copy the IBM 360 of 1965 proved a decisive mistake for it locked scientists into an antiquated system they were unable to improve. They had enormous difficulties in manufacturing the necessary chips reliably and in quantity, in programming workable and efficient programs, in coordinating entirely separate operations, and in providing support to computer users.

One of the greatest strengths of Soviet economy was its vast supplies of oil and gas; world oil prices quadrupled in 1973–1974, and rose again in 1979–1981, making the energy sector the chief driver of the Soviet economy, and was used to cover multiple weaknesses. At one point, Soviet Premier Alexei Kosygin told the head of oil and gas production, "things are bad with bread. Give me 3 million tons [of oil] over the plan." Former prime minister Yegor Gaidar, an economist looking back three decades, in 2007 wrote:

The hard currency from oil exports stopped the growing food supply crisis, increased the import of equipment and consumer goods, ensured a financial base for the arms race and the achievement of nuclear parity with the United States, and permitted the realization of such risky foreign-policy actions as the war in Afghanistan.

=== Soviet space program ===
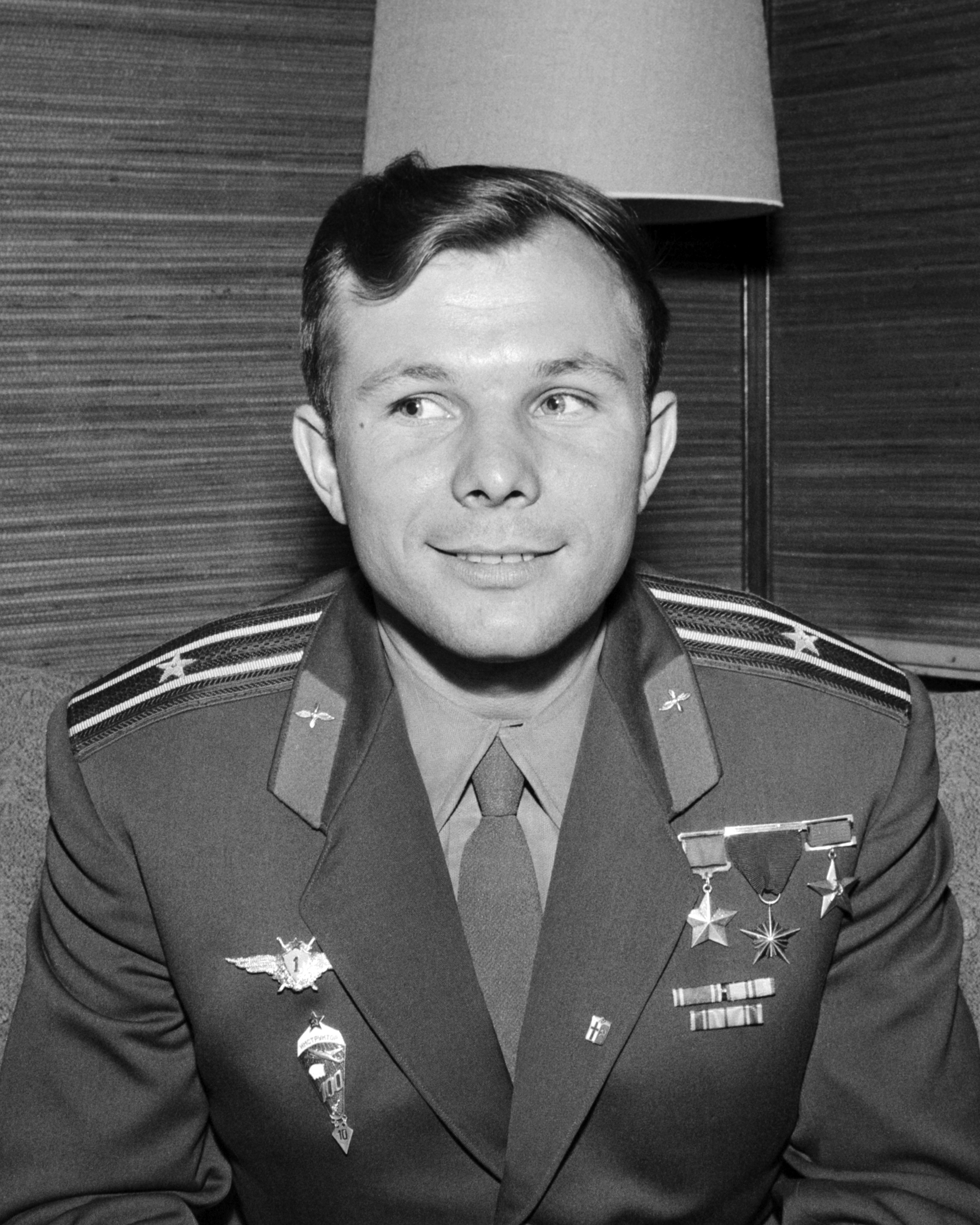
Yuri Gagarin, first human to travel into space.

The Soviet space program, founded by Sergey Korolev, was especially successful. On 4 October 1957, the Soviet Union launched the first satellite, Sputnik. On 12 April 1961, Yuri Gagarin became the first human to travel into space in the Soviet spaceship Vostok 1. Other achievements of Russian space program include: the first photo of the far side of the Moon; exploration of Venus; the first spacewalk by Alexei Leonov; first female spaceflight by Valentina Tereshkova. In 1970 and 1973, the world's first planetary rovers were sent to the moon: Lunokhod 1 and Lunokhod 2. More recently, the Soviet Union produced the world's first space station, Salyut, which in 1986 was replaced by Mir, the first consistently inhabited long-term space station, that served from 1986 to 2001.

=== Perestroika and Glasnost ===
Two developments dominated the decade that followed: the increasingly apparent crumbling of the Soviet Union's economic and political structures, and the patchwork attempts at reforms to reverse that process. After the rapid succession of Yuri Andropov and Konstantin Chernenko, Mikhail Gorbachev implemented perestroika in an attempt to modernize Soviet communism, and made significant changes in the party leadership. However, Gorbachev's social reforms led to unintended consequences. His policy of glasnost facilitated public access to information after decades of government repression, and social problems received wider public attention, undermining the Communist Party's authority. Glasnost allowed ethnic and nationalist disaffection to reach the surface, and many constituent republics, especially the Baltic republics, Georgian SSR and Moldavian SSR, sought greater autonomy, which Moscow was unwilling to provide. In the revolutions of 1989 the USSR lost its allies in Eastern Europe. Gorbachev's attempts at economic reform were not sufficient, and the Soviet government left intact most of the fundamental elements of communist economy. Suffering from low pricing of petroleum and natural gas, the ongoing war in Afghanistan, and outdated industry and pervasive corruption, the Soviet planned economy proved to be ineffective, and by 1990 the Soviet government had lost control over economic conditions. Due to price control, there were shortages of almost all products. Control over the constituent republics was also relaxed, and they began to assert their national sovereignty.

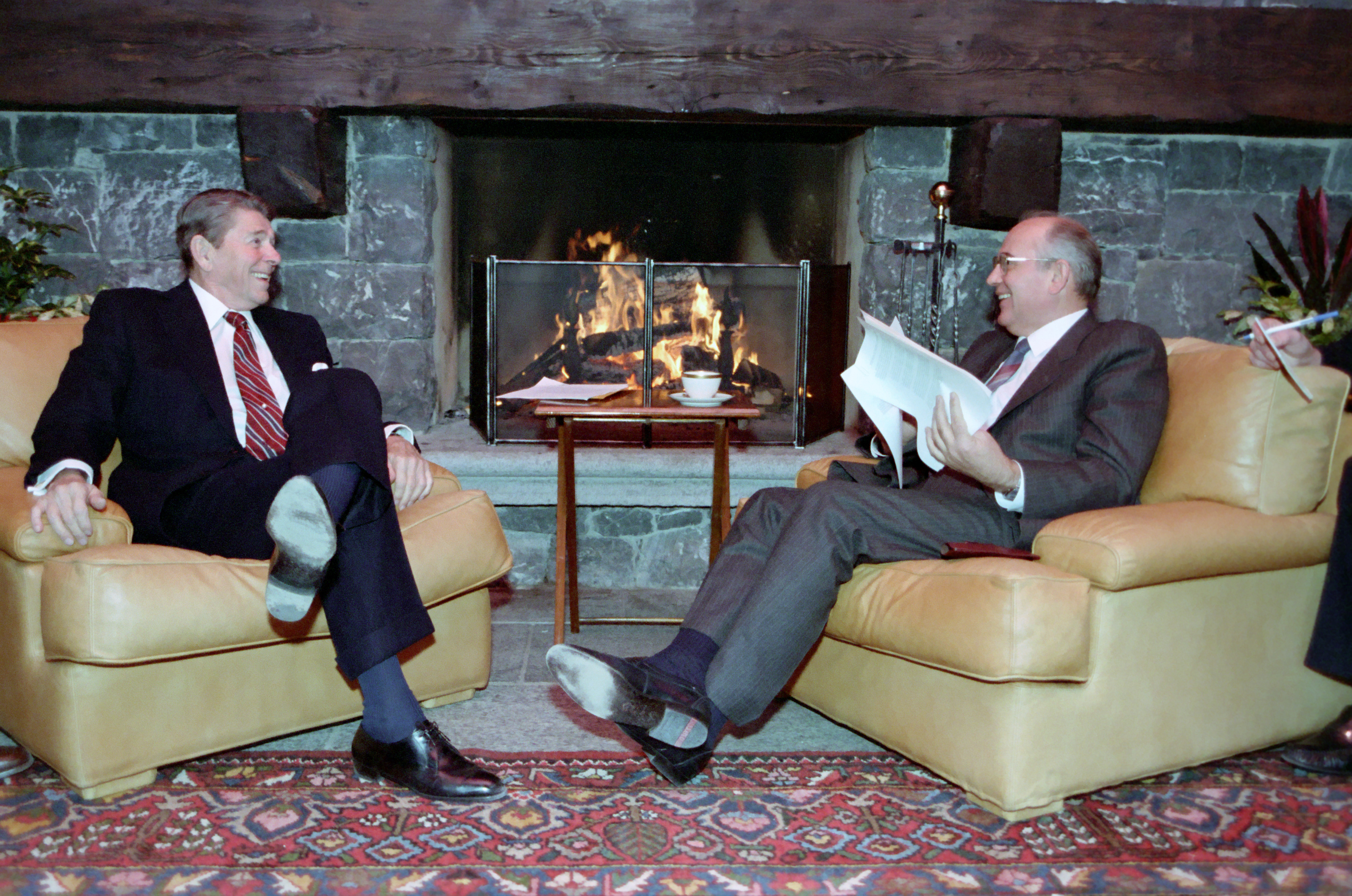
Ronald Reagan and Mikhail Gorbachev in Geneva, November 1985.

The tension between Soviet Union and Russian SFSR authorities came to be personified in the power struggle between Gorbachev and Boris Yeltsin. Squeezed out of Union politics by Gorbachev in 1987, Yeltsin, who represented himself as a committed democrat, presented a significant opposition to Gorbachev's authority. In a remarkable reversal of fortunes, he gained election as chairman of the Russian republic's new Supreme Soviet in May 1990.

=== Priority over Soviet Union laws and negotiations on a new Treaty ===
The following month, Yeltsin secured legislation giving Russian laws priority over Soviet laws. Article 5 of the Declaration of State Sovereignty of the Russian Soviet Federative Socialist Republic establishes the full authority of the RSFSR, with the exception of those which it voluntarily transfers to the Union of Soviet Socialist Republics, as well as the supremacy of the Constitution of the RSFSR and the laws of the RSFSR over the entire territory of the RSFSR. Acts of the Union of SSR which conflict with the sovereign rights of the RSFSR shall be suspended by the Republic on its territory. And also Yeltsin withholding two-thirds of the budget. In the first Russian presidential election in 1991 Yeltsin became president of the Russian SFSR. At last Gorbachev attempted to restructure the Soviet Union into a less centralized state. However, on 19 August 1991, a coup against Gorbachev was attempted. The coup faced wide popular opposition and collapsed in three days, but disintegration of the Union became imminent. The Russian government took over most of the Soviet Union government institutions on its territory. Because of the dominant position of Russians in the Soviet Union, most gave little thought to any distinction between Russia and the Soviet Union before the late 1980s. In the Soviet Union, only Russian SFSR lacked its own republic-level Communist Party branch, trade union councils, Academy of Sciences, and the like.

=== Soviet coup attempt, the Transition Period and the end of the Soviet Union ===
The Communist Party of the Soviet Union was banned in Russia in 1991, although no lustration has ever taken place, and many of its members became top Russian officials. However, as the Soviet government was still opposed to immediate market reforms, the economic situation continued to deteriorate.

On 24 September, RSFSR State Secretary Gennady Burbulis arrived to Boris Yeltsin, who was on vacation at the Black Sea coast. He brought a document “Russia's Strategy for the Transition Period”, which later received the unofficial name “Burbulis Memorandum”. The “memorandum” contained an analysis of the situation in the country, proposals on what should be done without delay, prepared by Yegor Gaidar's group. The document concluded that Russia should take the course of economic independence with a “soft”, “temporary” political alliance with other republics, i.e. to create not a declared, but a truly independent state of Russia. 30 years later, Burbulis recalled that the Burbulis Memorandum was the reform concept of Gaidar's group: There was not any secrecy. First Yegor Gaidar made a report at the State Council of the RSFSR, and then Burbulis spoke at the State Council and said he would make a report for Yeltsin.

As the Kommersant newspaper wrote on 7 October 1991, a series of conflicts occurred in the RSFSR government during preparations for the signing of the Treaty on the Economic Community. In his speech to members of the Russian parliament, RSFSR State Secretary Gennady Burbulis declared Russia's special role as the legal successor to the Soviet Union. Accordingly, the ways of drafting agreements with the republics should be determined by the Russian leadership. Instead of the planned order, he suggested signing a political agreement first, followed by an economic one. The newspaper suggested that Burbulis' goal was to persuade Yeltsin not to sign the agreement as it stands at the time. Yegor Gaidar, Alexander Shokhin and Konstantin Kagalovsky were named as the developers of the statement made by Burbulis. In the same time, a group of "isolationist patriots" consisting of Mikhail Maley, Nikolai Fedorov, Alexander Shokhin, Igor Lazarev and Mikhail Poltoranin criticized Ivan Silaev and Yevgeny Saburov for wanting to preserve the Soviet Union.

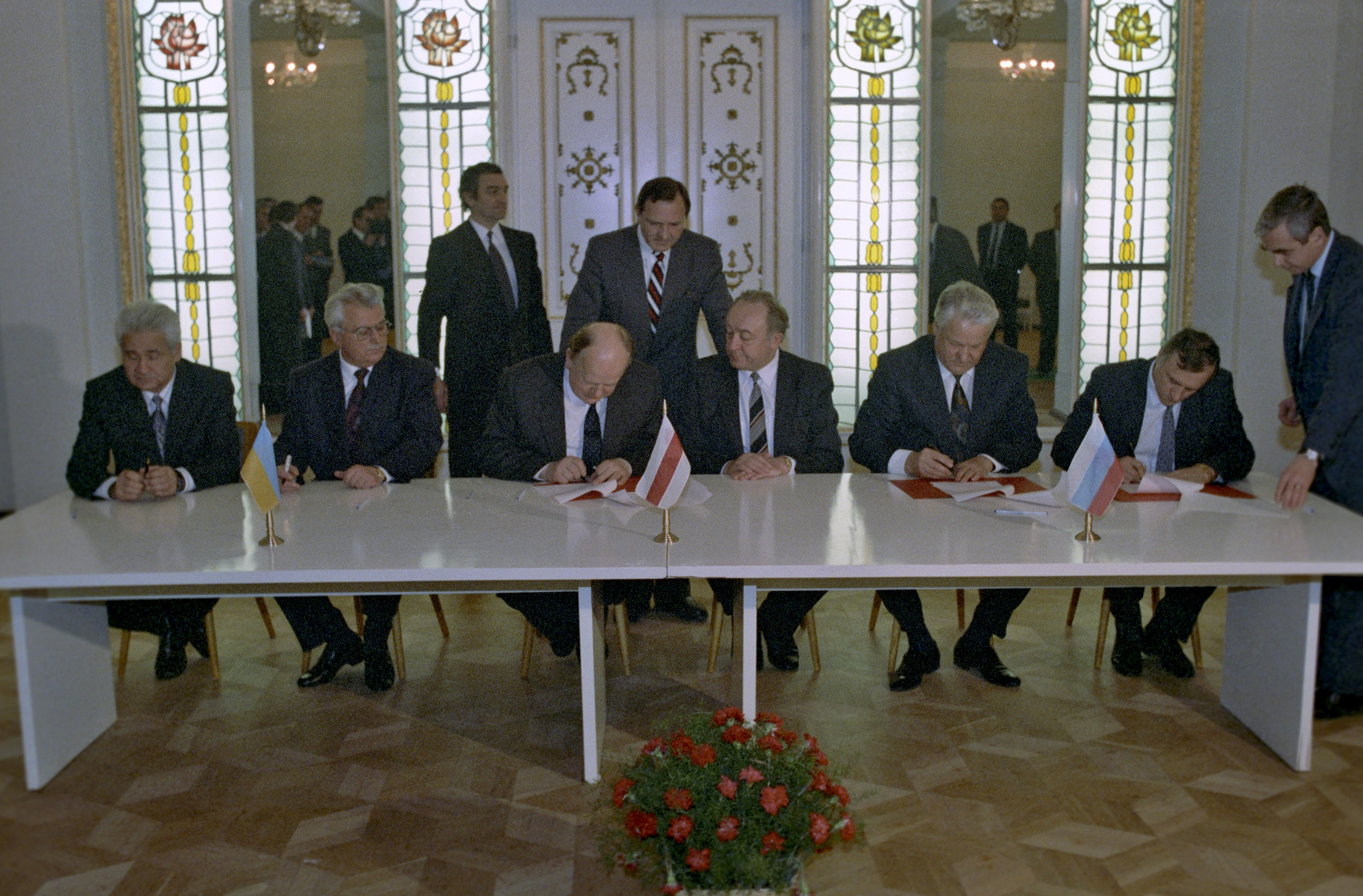
Leaders of the Soviet Republics sign the Belovezh Accords, effectively ending the existence of the Soviet Union and establishing the Commonwealth of Independent States, 8 December 1991

The Treaty on Economic Community was signed in Moscow on 18 October 1991 in a single copy in the Russian language by the competent representatives, including Boris Yeltsin.

By December 1991, the shortages had resulted in the introduction of food rationing in Moscow and Saint Petersburg for the first time since World War II. Russia received humanitarian food aid from abroad. After the Belavezha Accords, the Supreme Soviet of Russia withdrew Russia from the Soviet Union on 12 December. The Soviet Union officially ended on 25 December 1991, and the Russian Federation (formerly the Russian Soviet Federative Socialist Republic) took power on 26 December. The Russian government lifted price control on 2 January 1992. Prices rose dramatically, but shortages disappeared.

== Russian Federation (1991–present) ==
=== Independent country and the Commonwealth ===
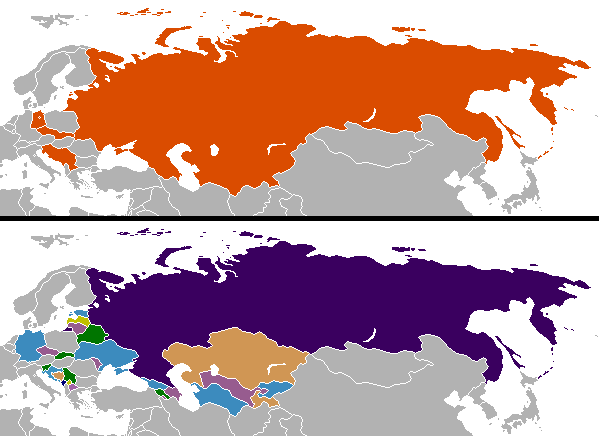
Changes in state borders after the dissolution of the Soviet Union and the end of the Cold War

Post-Soviet countries have signed a series of treaties and agreements to settle the legacy of the former Soviet Union multilaterally and bilaterally in particular status in international organizations, nuclear weapons and debts and assets and general agreements.

=== Liberal reforms of the 1990s ===
Although Yeltsin came to power on a wave of optimism, he never recovered his popularity after endorsing Yegor Gaidar's "shock therapy" of ending Soviet-era price controls, drastic cuts in state spending, and an open foreign trade regime in early 1992 (see Russian economic reform in the 1990s). The reforms immediately devastated the living standards of much of the population. In the 1990s Russia suffered an economic downturn that was, in some ways, more severe than the United States or Germany had undergone six decades earlier in the Great Depression. Hyperinflation hit the ruble, due to monetary overhang from the days of the planned economy.

Meanwhile, the profusion of small parties and their aversion to coherent alliances left the legislature chaotic. During 1993, Yeltsin's rift with the parliamentary leadership led to the September–October 1993 constitutional crisis. The crisis climaxed on 3 October, when Yeltsin chose a radical solution to settle his dispute with parliament: he called up tanks to shell the Russian White House, blasting out his opponents. As Yeltsin was taking the unconstitutional step of dissolving the legislature, Russia came close to a serious civil conflict. Yeltsin was then free to impose the current Russian constitution with strong presidential powers, which was approved by referendum in December 1993. The cohesion of the Russian Federation was also threatened when the republic of Chechnya attempted to break away, leading to the First and Second Chechen Wars.

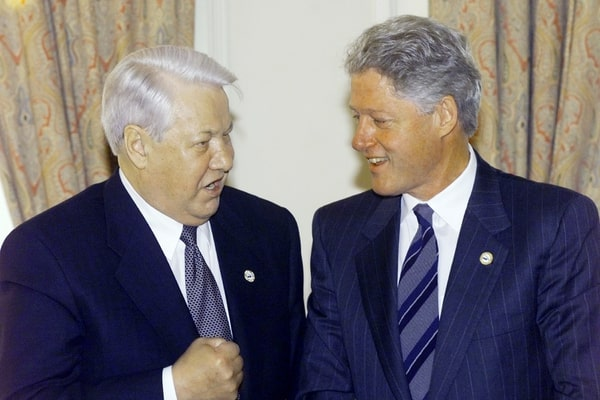
Boris Yeltsin (left), first president of Russian Federation, and US President Bill Clinton in 1999

Economic reforms also consolidated a semi-criminal oligarchy with roots in the old Soviet system. Advised by Western governments, the World Bank, and the International Monetary Fund, Russia embarked on the largest and fastest privatization ever to reform the fully nationalized Soviet economy. By mid-decade, retail, trade, services, and small industry was in private hands. Most big enterprises were acquired by their old managers, engendering a new rich (Russian tycoons) in league with criminal mafias or Western investors. Corporate raiders such as Andrei Volgin engaged in hostile takeovers of corrupt corporations by the mid-1990s.

By the mid-1990s Russia had a system of multiparty electoral politics. But it was harder to establish a representative government because of the struggle between president and parliament and the anarchic party system.

Meanwhile, the central government had lost control of the localities, bureaucracy, and economic fiefdoms, and tax revenues had collapsed. Still in a deep depression, Russia's economy was hit further by the financial crash of 1998. At the end of 1999, Yeltsin made a surprise announcement of his resignation, leaving the government in the hands of the Prime Minister Vladimir Putin.

=== Era of Putin ===
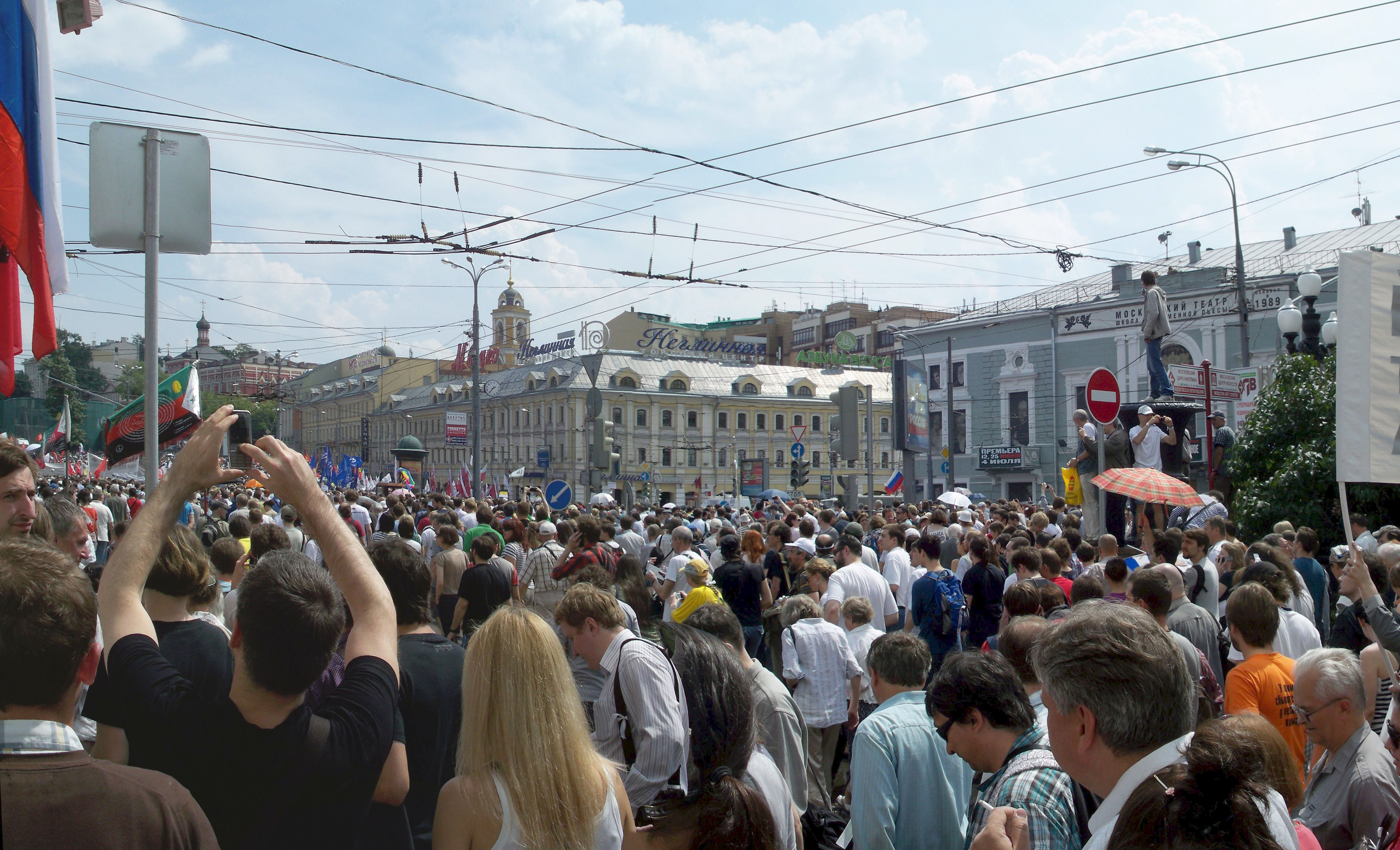
2011–2013 Russian protests against the conduct of Russia's parliamentary elections

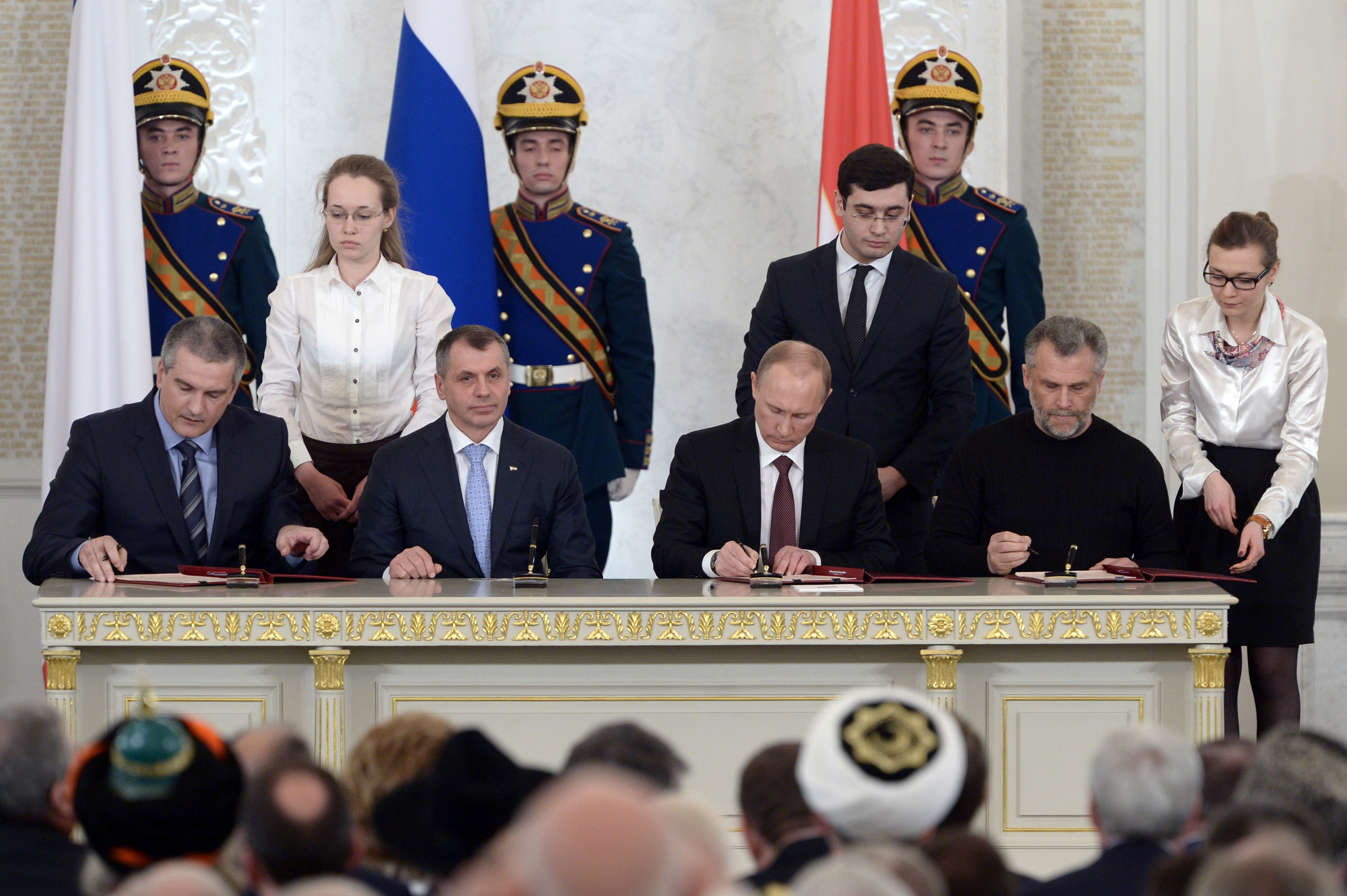
Vladimir Putin and pro-Russian Crimea leaders sign the Treaty on Accession of the Republic of Crimea to Russia in 2014.

In 2000, the new acting president won the presidential election on 26 March and won in a landslide four years later. The Second Chechen war ended with the victory of Russia. After the 11 September terrorist attacks, there was a rapprochement between Russia and the United States. Putin created a system of guided democracy in Russia by subjugating parliament, suppressing independent media and placing major oil and gas companies under state control.

International observers were alarmed by moves in late 2004 to further tighten the presidency's control over parliament, civil society, and regional officeholders. In 2008, Dmitri Medvedev, Putin's head of staff, was elected president. In 2012, Putin became president again, prompting massive protests in Moscow.

Russia's long-term problems include a shrinking workforce, rampant corruption, and underinvestment in infrastructure. Nevertheless, reversion to a socialist command economy seemed almost impossible. The economic problems are aggravated by massive capital outflows, as well as extremely difficult conditions for doing business, due to pressure from the security forces Siloviki and government agencies.

Due to high oil prices, from 2000 to 2008, Russia's GDP at PPP doubled. Although high oil prices and a relatively cheap ruble initially drove this growth, since 2003 consumer demand and, more recently, investment have played a significant role. Russia is well ahead of most other resource-rich countries in its economic development, with a long tradition of education, science, and industry. Russia hosted the 2014 Winter Olympic Games in Sochi.

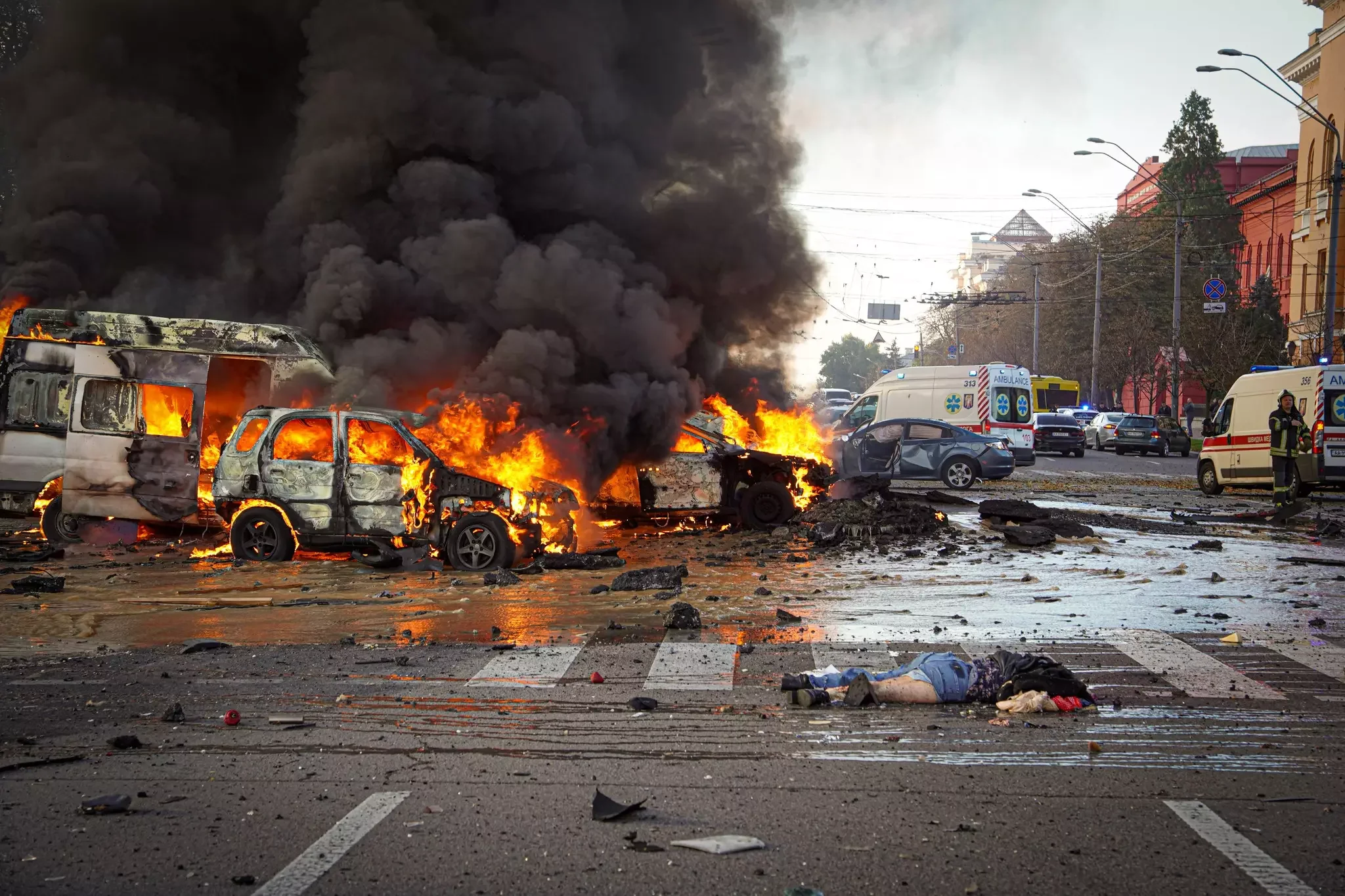
A street in Kyiv following Russian missile strikes on 10 October 2022

In 2014, following a controversial referendum, in which separation was favored by a large majority of voters according to official results, the Russian leadership announced the accession of Crimea into the Russian Federation, thus starting the Russo-Ukrainian War. Following Russia's annexation of Crimea and alleged Russian interference in the war in eastern Ukraine, international sanctions were imposed on Russia.

On 4 December 2011, elections to the State Duma were held, as a result of which United Russia won for the third time in a row. The official voting results caused significant protests in the country; a number of political scientists and journalists noted various falsifications on election day. In 2012, according to another pre-election agreement, a "castling" took place; Putin again became president and Dmitry Medvedev took over as chairman of the government, after which the protests acquired an anti-Putin orientation, but soon began to decline.

Since 2015, Russia has been conducting military intervention in Syria in support of the Bashar al-Assad regime.

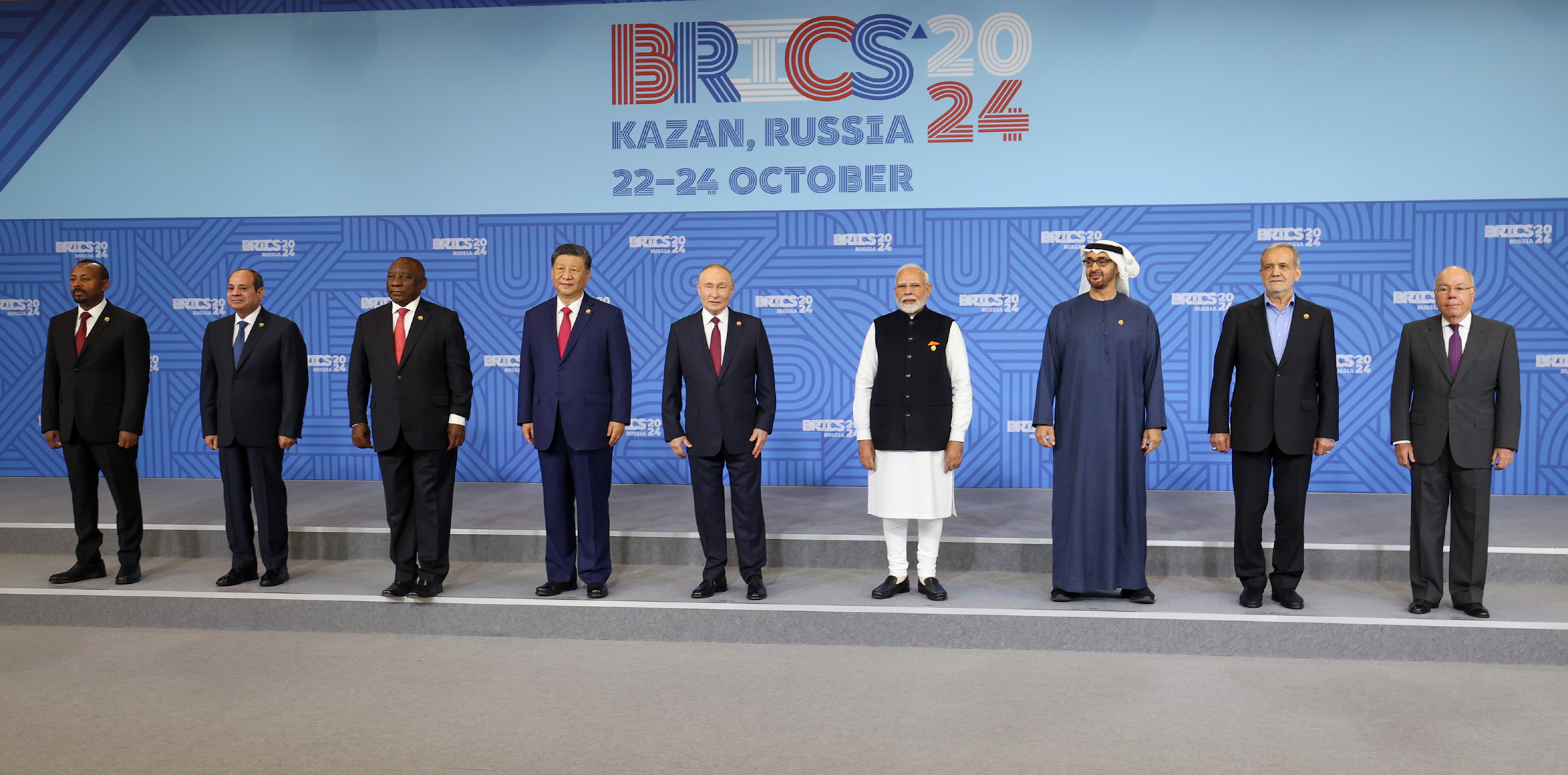
BRICS representatives at the 16th BRICS summit in Kazan, Russia, 23 October 2024

In 2018, Putin was re-elected for a fourth presidential term.

In 2022, Russia launched the invasion of Ukraine, which was denounced by NATO and the European Union. They aided Ukraine and imposed massive International sanctions during the 2022 Russian invasion of Ukraine. A leading banker in Moscow said the damage might take a decade to recover, as half of its international trade has been lost. Despite international opposition, Russia officially annexed the Donetsk People's Republic and the Luhansk People's Republic, along with most of the Kherson and Zaporizhzhia Oblasts on 30 September. The United Nations have reported that Russia has committed war crimes during the invasion.

In March 2023, Russia adopted a Eurasianist, anti-Western foreign policy strategy detailed in a document approved by Putin. The document defined Russia as a "unique country-civilization and a vast Eurasian and Euro-Pacific power" that seeks to create a "Greater Eurasian Partnership" by pursuing close relations with China, India, countries of the Islamic World and rest of the Global South (Latin America and sub-Saharan Africa). On 23 June 2023, the Wagner Group, a Russian paramilitary organization led by Yevgeny Prigozhin, rebelled against the government. As of August 2023, the total number of Russian and Ukrainian soldiers killed or wounded during the Russian invasion of Ukraine was nearly 500,000.

== See also ==
- Dissolution of the Soviet Union
- Family tree of the Russian monarchs
- General Secretary of the Communist Party of the Soviet Union
- History of Siberia
- History of the Caucasus
- History of the Jews in Russia
- History of the Soviet Union
- List of heads of government of Russia
- List of Russian rulers
- Military history of the Russian Empire
- Military history of the Soviet Union
- Politics of Russia
- Russian Armed Forces
- Russian Empire
- Soviet Union
- Timeline of Moscow
- Timeline of Russian history
- Timeline of Russian innovation
