= History of the Russian Federation =

History of Russia since the dissolution of the Soviet Union

- 1991–present
History of the Soviet Union (1982–1991)
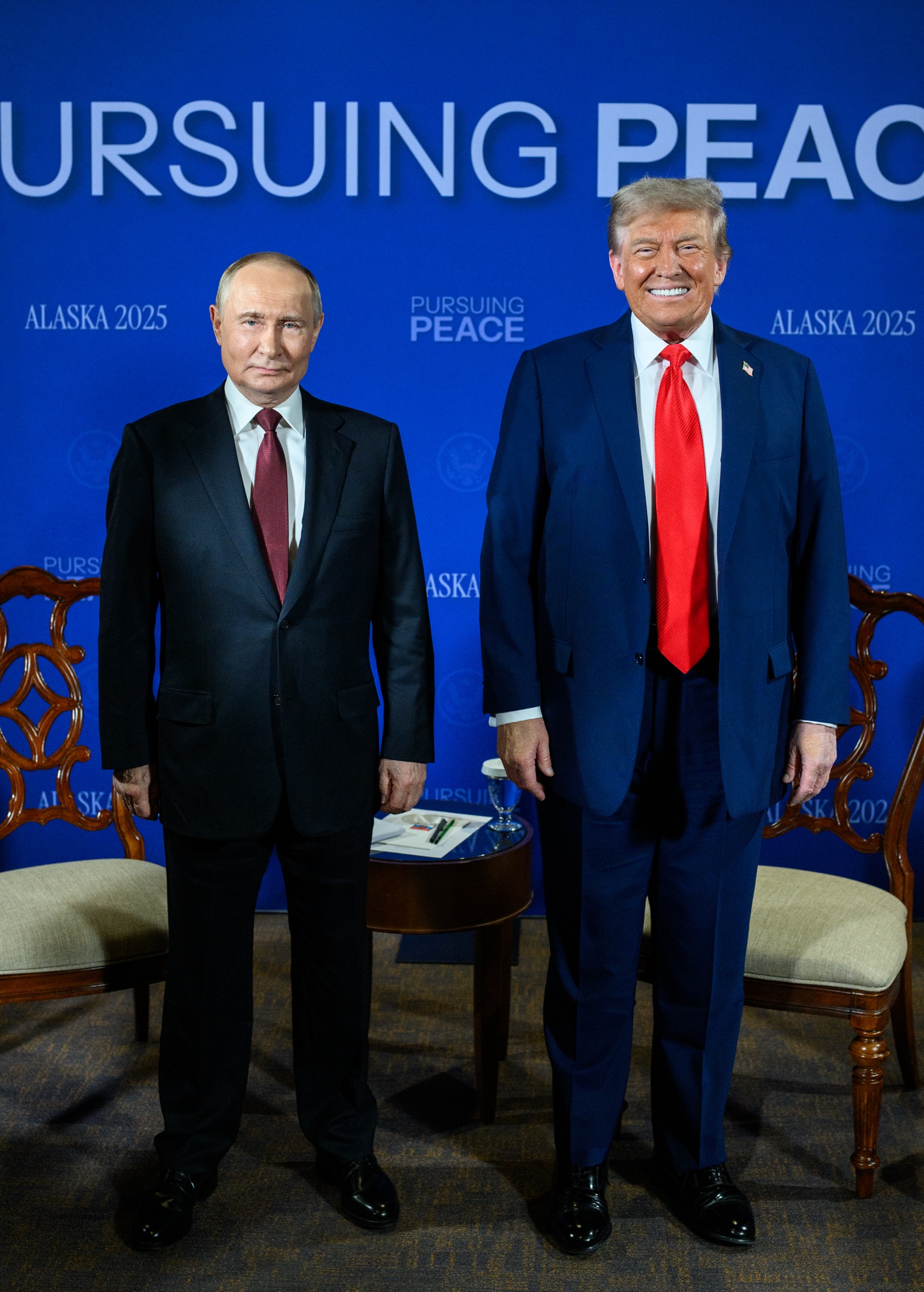
- Russian President Vladimir Putin and U.S President Donald Trump posing for a photo during the 2025 Russia–United States Summit.
- Location: Russia
- Including: Post–Cold War era
- President(s): Boris Yeltsin; Vladimir Putin; Dmitry Medvedev; Vladimir Putin
- Prime Ministers: Boris Yeltsin (Note: Headed the government as President of Russia, was not the Prime Minister.); Viktor Chernomyrdin; Sergey Kiriyenko; Yevgeny Primakov; Sergei Stepashin; Vladimir Putin; Mikhail Kasyanov; Mikhail Fradkov; Viktor Zubkov; Vladimir Putin; Dmitry Medvedev; Mikhail Mishustin
- Key events: Dissolution of the Soviet Union; 1993 Russian constitutional crisis; First Chechen War; 1999 Russian apartment bombings; Second Chechen War; Moscow theater hostage crisis; Beslan school siege; Russo-Georgian war; Great Recession; Insurgency in the North Caucasus; New START; 2014 Winter Olympics; 2014 Russian annexation of Crimea; War in Donbas; Russian intervention in the Syrian civil war; 2018 FIFA World Cup; COVID-19 pandemic; Russian Invasion of Ukraine; Wagner Group rebellion; Crocus City Hall attack

The modern history of Russia began with the Russian SFSR, a constituent republic of the Soviet Union, gaining more political and economical autonomy amidst the imminent dissolution of the USSR during 1988–1991, proclaiming its sovereignty inside the Union in June 1990, and electing its first President Boris Yeltsin a year later. The Russian Soviet Federative Socialist Republic was the largest Soviet Socialist Republic, but it had no significant independence before, being the only Soviet republic to not have its own branch of the Communist Party.

The RSFSR was the largest of the fifteen republics that made up the USSR, accounting for over 60% of its GDP and over 50% of its population. Russians also dominated the Soviet military and the Communist Party. As such, the Russian Federation was widely accepted as the USSR's successor state in diplomatic affairs and it assumed the USSR's permanent membership and veto in the UN Security Council (see Russia and the United Nations).

Prior to the dissolution of the USSR, Yeltsin had been elected President of the RSFSR in June 1991 in the first direct presidential election in Russian history. This ensured that he would be the political leader of the Russian successor state following dissolution. This situation resulted in political turmoil as the Soviet and Russian leadership wrestled for control, which culminated in the 1991 August coup, where the Soviet military attempted to overthrow Mikhail Gorbachev. Although the coup was ultimately averted, this situation contributed to rising instability in the Soviet Union. As the USSR was on the verge of collapse by October 1991, Yeltsin announced that Russia would proceed with radical reforms, including shock therapy policies to introduce capitalism. This caused a sustained economic recession, and GDP per capita levels eventually returned to their 1991 levels by the mid-2000s. Following Yeltsin's resignation in December 1999, Russia's politics have since been dominated by Vladimir Putin, serving as either President or Prime Minister. Although the Russian economy has improved significantly under Putin's leadership following relative economic chaos under Yeltsin, Putin has also been widely accused of corruption, authoritarian leadership, and widespread human rights abuses. An authoritarian form of governance in Russia since 2000 has been called Putinism.

For the most part, the Russian armed forces were in near complete disarray by 1992, one year after dissolution. This degraded military effectiveness would become all too clear during the 1994 Chechen War, and in the interim posed significant practical challenges for global security and arms control. Under Russian leadership, the Lisbon Protocol ensured that former Soviet republics would disarm themselves of nuclear weapons. This affected Kazakhstan in particular, as it hosted a significant share of the world's nuclear weapons immediately following the dissolution of the Soviet Union. However, the former Soviet republics were able to maintain transnational cooperation in other military areas, like establishing shared responsibility for the rocket and space infrastructure such as the Baikonur Cosmodrome.

== Reforms ==
=== "Shock therapy" ===
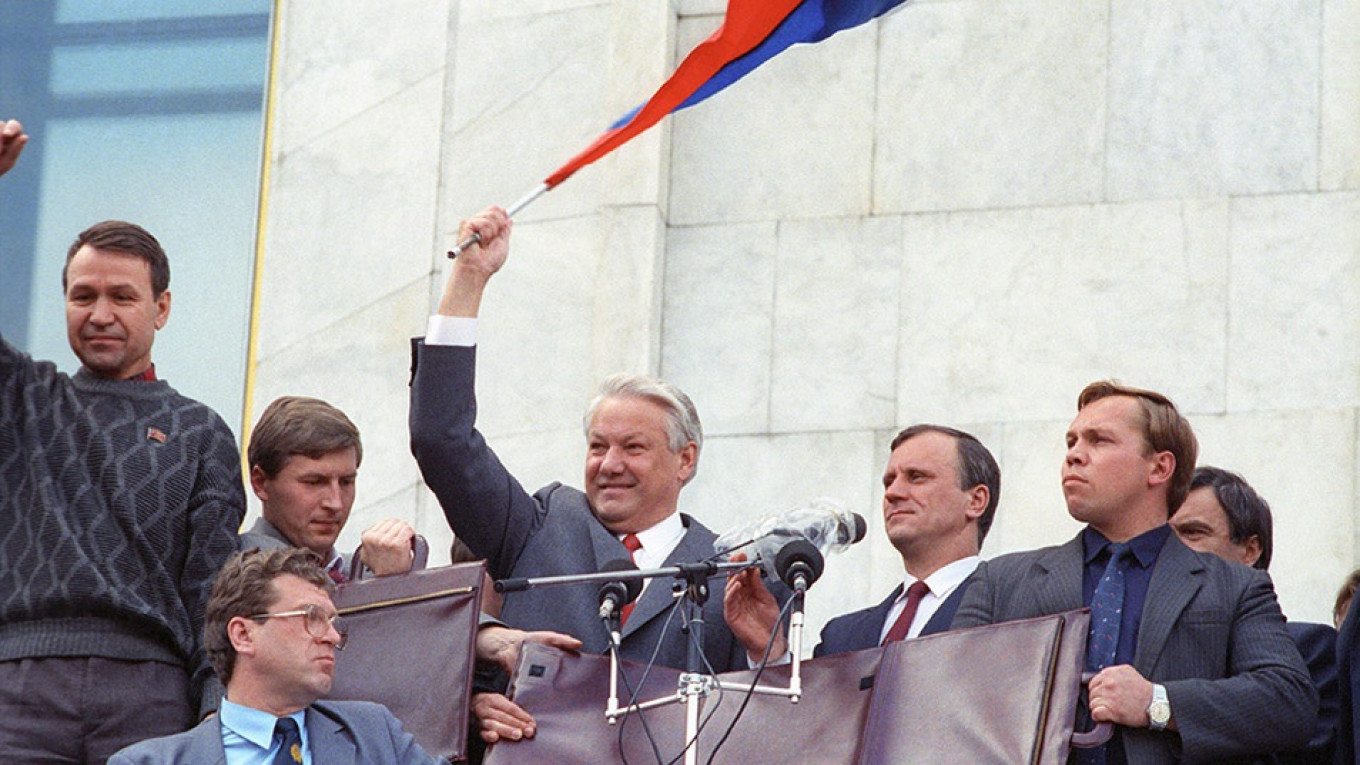
President Yeltsin celebrating the victory of the August 1991 coup attempt.

With the dissolution of the Warsaw Pact and COMECON and other treaties that served to bind its satellite states to the Soviet Union, the conversion of the world's largest state-controlled economy into a market-oriented economy would have been extraordinarily difficult regardless of the policies chosen. The policies chosen for this transition were (1) liberalization, (2) stabilization and (3) privatization. These policies were based on the Washington Consensus of the International Monetary Fund (IMF), World Bank and Treasury Department.

On 2 January 1992, Yeltsin—acting as his own prime minister—enacted the most comprehensive components of economic reform by decree, thereby circumventing the Supreme Soviet of Russia and Congress of People's Deputies of Russia, which had been elected in March 1990, before the dissolution of the USSR. While this spared Yeltsin from the prospects of bargaining and wrangling with Soviet deputies, it also eliminated any meaningful discussion of the right course of action for the country.

The programs of liberalization and stabilization were designed by Yeltsin's deputy prime minister Yegor Gaidar, a liberal economist inclined toward radical reform, and widely known as an advocate of "shock therapy". Shock therapy was originally used in Bolivia by notable economist Jeffery Sachs to combat inflation in the 1980s. Having achieved some major successes in Bolivia, shock therapy was then imported to the Polish context following the dissolution of the Soviet Union, and Russia shortly after.

The partial results of liberalization (lifting price controls) included worsening already apparent hyperinflation, initially due to monetary overhang and exacerbated after the central bank, an organ under parliament, which was skeptical of Yeltsin's reforms, was short of revenue and printed money to finance its debt. This resulted in the near bankruptcy of much of Russian industry.

The process of liberalization would create winners and losers, depending on how particular industries, classes, age groups, ethnic groups, regions, and other sectors of Russian society were positioned. Some would benefit by the opening of competition; others would suffer. Among the winners were the new class of entrepreneurs and black marketeers that had emerged under Mikhail Gorbachev's perestroika. But liberalizing prices meant that the elderly and others on fixed incomes would suffer a severe drop in living standards, and people would see a lifetime of savings wiped out.

With inflation at double-digit rates per month as a result of printing, macroeconomic stabilization was enacted to curb this trend. Stabilization, also called structural adjustment, is a harsh austerity regime (tight monetary policy and fiscal policy) for the economy in which the government seeks to control inflation. Under the stabilization program, the government let most prices float, raised interest rates to record highs, raised heavy new taxes, sharply cut back on government subsidies to industry and construction, and made massive cuts in state welfare spending. These policies caused widespread hardship as many state enterprises found themselves without orders or financing. A deep credit crunch shut down many industries and brought about a protracted depression.

The rationale of the program was to squeeze the built-in inflationary pressure out of the economy so that producers would begin making sensible decisions about production, pricing and investment instead of chronically overusing resources—a problem that resulted in shortages of consumer goods in the Soviet Union in the 1980s. By letting the market rather than central planners determine prices, product mixes, output levels, and the like, the reformers intended to create an incentive structure in the economy where efficiency and risk would be rewarded and waste and carelessness were punished. Removing the causes of chronic inflation, the reform architects argued, was a precondition for all other reforms: Hyperinflation would wreck both democracy and economic progress, they argued; they also argued that only by stabilizing the state budget could the government proceed to dismantle the Soviet planned economy and create a new capitalist Russia.

Nonetheless, radical reform continued to face some critical political barriers. The Central Bank was still subordinate to the conservative Supreme Soviet who continued to support socialist policies in opposition to Yeltsin and the presidency. During the height of hyperinflation in 1992–1993, the Central Bank actually tried to derail reforms by actively printing even more money during this period of inflation. After all, the Russian government was short of revenue and was forced to print money to finance its debt. As a result, inflation exploded into hyperinflation, and the Russian economy continued into an evermore serious slump.

=== Privatization ===
Upon the Soviet Union's collapse, the new Russian government was forced to manage the huge state enterprise sector inherited from the Soviet economy. Privatization was carried out by the State Committee for State Property Management of the Russian Federation under Anatoly Chubais with the primary goal being to transform the formerly state-owned enterprises into profit-seeking businesses, which would not be dependent on government subsidies for their survival. To distribute property quickly and to win over popular support, the reformers decided to rely mostly on the mechanism of free voucher privatization, which was earlier implemented in Czechoslovakia. The Russian government believed that the open sale of state-owned assets, as opposed to the voucher program, would have likely resulted in the further concentration of ownership among the Russian mafia and the nomenklatura, which they sought to avoid. Nevertheless, contrary to the government's expectations, insiders managed to acquire control over most of the assets, which remained largely dependent on government support for years to come. From 1992 to 1994, ownership of 15,000 firms was transferred from state control via the voucher program.

Privatization of the oil sector was regulated by presidential decree No.1403 approved on 17 November 1992. Vertically integrated companies were created by joining some oil-producing enterprises and refineries into open-stock companies. Starting in 1994 many former state oil companies were privatized. This privatization had been partial because the federal government had obtained ownership positions in several companies and had also retained full control over the transport of oil to lucrative world markets.

In 1995, facing severe fiscal deficit and in desperate need of funds for the 1996 presidential elections, the government of Boris Yeltsin adopted a "loans-for-share" scheme proposed by banker Vladimir Potanin and endorsed by Anatoly Chubais, then a deputy prime minister, whereby some of the largest state industrial assets (including state-owned shares in Norilsk Nickel, Yukos, Lukoil, Sibneft, Surgutneftegas, Novolipetsk Steel, and Mechel) were leased through auctions for money lent by commercial banks to the government. The auctions were rigged and lacked competition, being largely controlled by favored insiders with political connections or used for the benefit of the commercial banks themselves. As neither the loans nor the leased enterprises were returned in time, this effectively became a form of selling, or privatizing, state assets at very low prices.

The privatization facilitated the transfer of significant wealth to a relatively small group of business oligarchs and New Russians, particularly natural gas and oil executives.

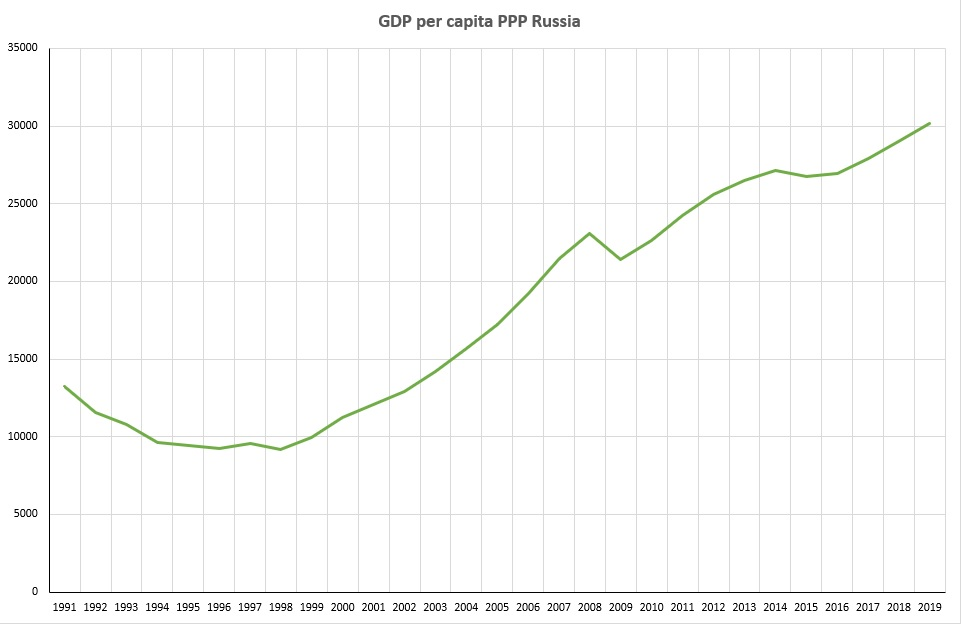
Russia's GDP by purchasing power parity (PPP) from 1991 to 2019 (in international dollars)

=== Obstacles to reform ===
The former Soviet Union had to deal with a number of unique obstacles during the post-Soviet transition including political reform, economic restructuring and the redrawing of political boundaries. The discomfort associated with these changes was not felt the same in each former Soviet republic. As a general rule, states to Russia's west, such as Poland, Hungary, and the Czech Republic, have fared slightly better than their eastern neighbors since the collapse of the Eastern bloc, while Russia itself and countries to Russia's east experienced greater difficulties and found themselves on worse footing immediately after dissolution. A major reason that Russia's transition has been so wrenching is that it is remaking both its Soviet-era political and economic institutions at once. In addition to institutional reforms designed to create a new political-economic system, Russia was also charged with remaking itself into a new national state following the disintegration of the Soviet Union.

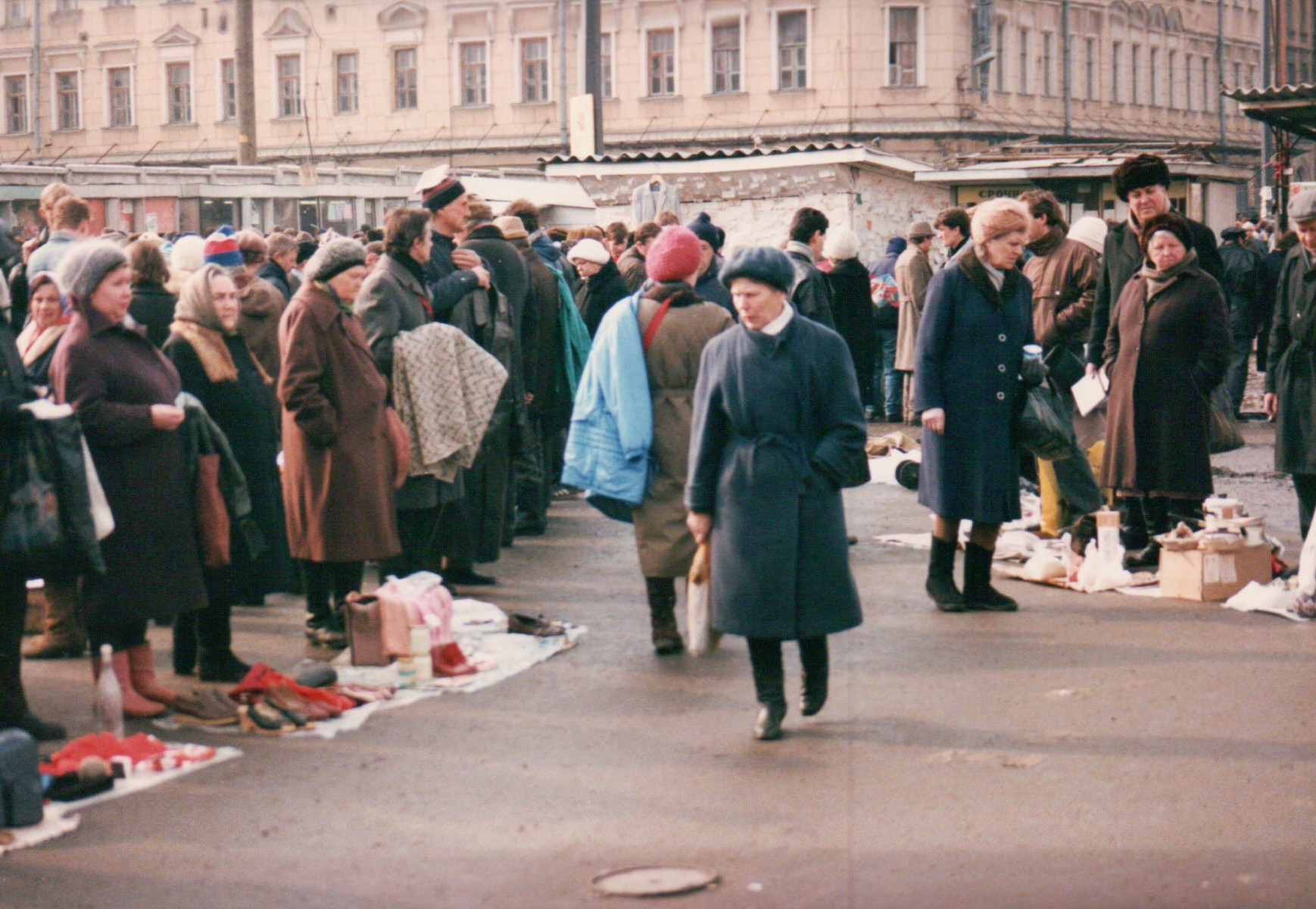
A street flea market in Rostov-on-Don, 1992

The first major problem facing Russia was the legacy of the Soviet Union's enormous commitment to the Cold War. In the late 1980s, the Soviet Union devoted a quarter of its gross economic output to the defense sector (at the time most Western analysts believed that this figure was 15 percent). At the time, the military-industrial complex employed at least one of every five adults in the Soviet Union. In some regions of Russia, at least half of the workforce was employed in defense plants (the comparable U.S. figures were roughly one-sixteenth of gross national product and about one of every sixteen in the workforce). These over-reliance on the military sector made Russian industry and human capital relatively noncompetitive upon entry into a market-oriented system. Furthermore, the end of the Cold War and the cutback in military spending affected industry quite dramatically making it difficult to quickly retool equipment, retrain workers, and find new markets. In the process of economic re-tooling, an enormous body of experience, qualified specialists and know-how was lost or misallocated, as the plants were sometimes switching from, for example, producing hi-tech military equipment to making kitchen utensils.

A second obstacle, partly related to the sheer vastness and geographical diversity of the Russian landmass, was the sizable number of "mono-industrial" regional economies (regions dominated by a single industrial employer) that Russia inherited from the Soviet Union. The concentration of production in a relatively small number of big state enterprises meant that many local governments were entirely dependent on the economic health of a single employer; when the Soviet Union collapsed and the economic ties between Soviet republics and even regions were severed, the production in the whole country dropped by more than fifty percent. Roughly half of Russia's cities had only one large industrial enterprise, and three fourths had no more than four. Consequently, the decrease in production caused tremendous unemployment and underemployment.

Thirdly, post-Soviet Russia did not inherit a system of state social security and welfare from the USSR. Instead the companies, mainly large industrial firms, were traditionally responsible for a broad range of social welfare functions—building and maintaining housing for their work forces, and managing health, recreational, educational, and similar facilities. The towns in contrast possessed neither the apparatus nor the funds for the provision of basic social services. Industrial employees were left heavily dependent on their firms. Thus, economic transformation created severe problems in maintaining social welfare since local governments were unable to assume finance or operational responsibility for these functions.

Finally, there is a human capital dimension to the failure of post-Soviet reforms in Russia. The former Soviet population was not necessarily uneducated. Literacy was nearly universal, and the educational level of the Soviet population was among the highest in the world with respect to science, engineering, and some technical disciplines, although the Soviets devoted little to what would be described as "liberal arts" in the West. With the move to a post-Communist system, the Russian university system collapsed. Rampant credential inflation in the Russian university system made it difficult for employers to determine who was really skilled and the problems of the higher education system more generally made it difficult to remedy other issues of human capital that came from the transition to a market-oriented system, such as upskilling and re-skilling. For example, former state enterprise managers were highly skilled at coping with the demands on them under the Soviet system of planned production targets, but discouraged the risk-and-reward centered behavior of market capitalism. These managers were responsible for a broad array of social welfare functions for their employees, their families, and the population of the towns and regions where they were located. Profitability and efficiency, however, were generally not the most prominent priorities for Soviet enterprise managers. Thus, almost no Soviet employees or managers had firsthand experience with decision-making in the conditions of a market economy.

=== Economic depression and mortality crisis ===
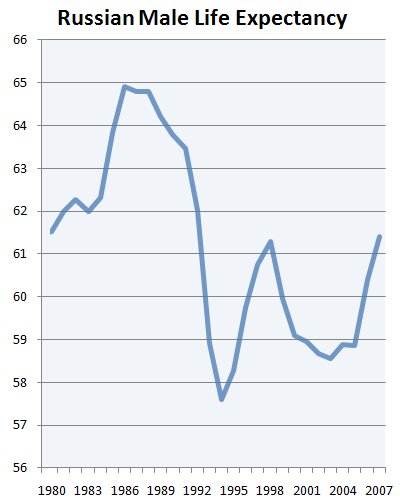
Russian male life expectancy from 1980 to 2007

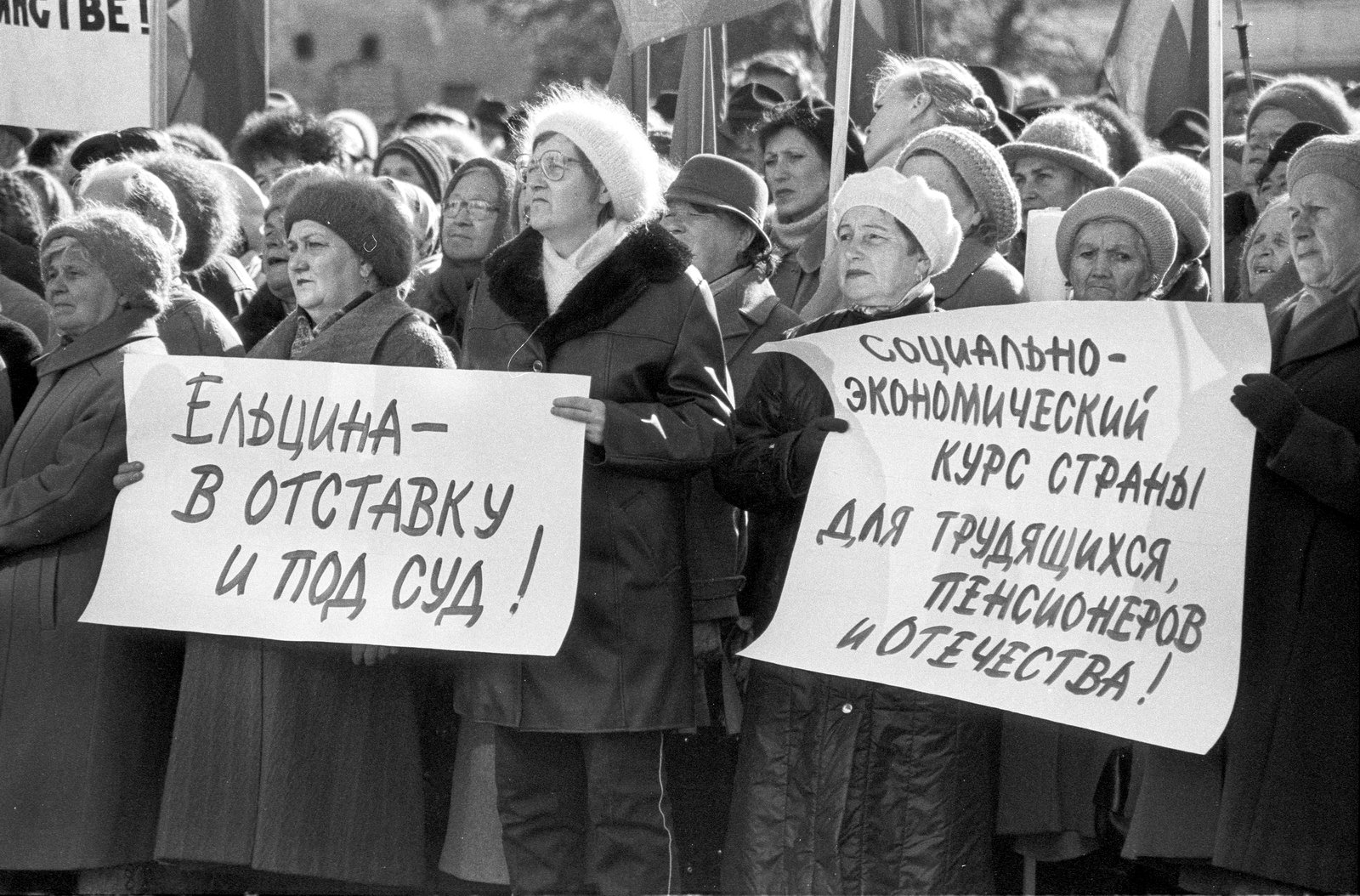
Pensioners at a rally as part of the All-Russian trade union action "No to destructive economic reforms" in Pereslavl-Zalessky, October 7, 1998

After the initial turmoil and euphoria of early marketizations, Russia's economy sank into deep depression by the mid-1990s due to botched reform efforts and low commodity prices globally but not before George H. W. Bush helped Yeltsin with "an unparalleled opportunity to change the nuclear posture of both the United States and the Soviet Union" and to end the Cold War peacefully with the Nunn–Lugar cash-for-weapons scheme, in order to avoid the worst of the dissolution of the vast Soviet technological empire. Russia's economy was hit further by the financial crash of 1998 before experiencing a modest recovery in 1999–2000 as commodity prices began to rise again. According to Russian government statistics, the economic decline was far more severe than the Great Depression was in the United States in terms of gross domestic product.

In 1995, a little over 3% of the work force was officially registered as unemployed, but, in addition to the technically jobless, 4.4% of the labour force were working only part time, while a further 3.9% had been sent on involuntary leave. Also millions of Russians turned up for work each day, but were not paid by the employers. If all these categories of jobless, semi-employed and unpaid workers were taken into account, the 18% Russian unemployment figure cited in June 1995 by labour market expert Tatyana Maleva of the Institute of Economic Analysis seemed real. With unemployment benefits sufficient only to buy a small loaf of bread each day, trying to survive without some other income was not an option for those who lost jobs. They were toiling during the warmer months to grow food in family vegetable plots, selling newspapers or lottery tickets on the streets, busking, begging, turning to prostitution. Often they sank into the criminal underworld.

In 1997, at least 98,400 companies were defaulting on payments to employees. It was estimated that one out of four Russian workers, or close on 20 million people, were not paid for months. Some were paid "in kind": for example, women workers were paid in brassieres and shoes that they resold in the streets, workers of Moskvich, the auto plant in Moscow, were paid in spare parts, those of the Ivanovo textile plants were paid in bedsheets, and those of the Gus-Khrustalny porcelain factory were paid in crystal and ceramic vases.

By way of a domestic comparison, the post-Soviet economic decline was about half as severe as the economic catastrophe borne out of the immediate consequence of World War I, the fall of Tsarism, and the Russian Civil War.

Following the economic collapse of the early 1990s, Russia suffered from a sharp increase in the rates of poverty and economic inequality. Estimates by the World Bank based on both macroeconomic data and surveys of household incomes and expenditures indicate that whereas 1.5% of the population was living in poverty (defined as income below the equivalent of $25 per month) in the late Soviet era, by mid-1993 between 39% and 49% of the population was living in poverty. Per capita incomes fell by another 15% by 1998, according to government figures.

Public health indicators show a dramatic corresponding decline. Although all post-Soviet countries experience an immediate decline in birth-rates due to economic turmoil this may have been particularly acute in Russia. In 1999, total population fell by about three-quarters of a million people. Meanwhile, life expectancy dropped for men from 64 years in 1990 to 57 years by 1994, while women's dropped from 74 to about 71. Both health factors and a sharp increase in deaths of the youth demographic from unnatural causes (such as murders, suicides, and accidents) have significantly contributed to this trend. Closely related to the declining life expectancy, alcohol-related deaths skyrocketed 60% in the 1990s and deaths from infectious and parasitic diseases shot up 100%, mainly because medicines were no longer affordable to the poor. The mortality crisis resulted in approximately 1.6 million excess deaths during 1990–1995 when compared to earlier levels. During 1998–2001, the excessive rate of mortality was predominantly represented by suicide, traffic incidents, homicide, unintentional alcohol poisoning and falls. Mortality was lower in areas where privatisation was more gradual, with this effect continuing into the 2000s.

While the opening of the Russian market to imports in the early 1990s meant the nation no longer suffered from the supply shortages of consumer goods that was often characteristic of the USSR (see Consumer goods in the Soviet Union), the relative impoverishment of the Russian people during this time meant only a limited number saw any significant benefit. Russians on fixed incomes (the vast majority of the workforce) saw their purchasing power drastically reduced, so while the stores might have been well stocked in the Yeltsin era, average people could now afford to buy little, if anything from these stores. By 2011, the average income has risen to more than $700 per month, emblematic of the mild recovery in recent years largely due to high oil prices. The growing revenue, however, has not been evenly distributed. Social inequality has risen sharply since the 1990s with the Gini coefficient, for example, reaching 42% by the end of 2010. Russia's income disparities are now nearly as large as Brazil (which has long been a world leader in the area) while regional disparities in the level of poverty continue to trend upwards.

=== Backlash ===
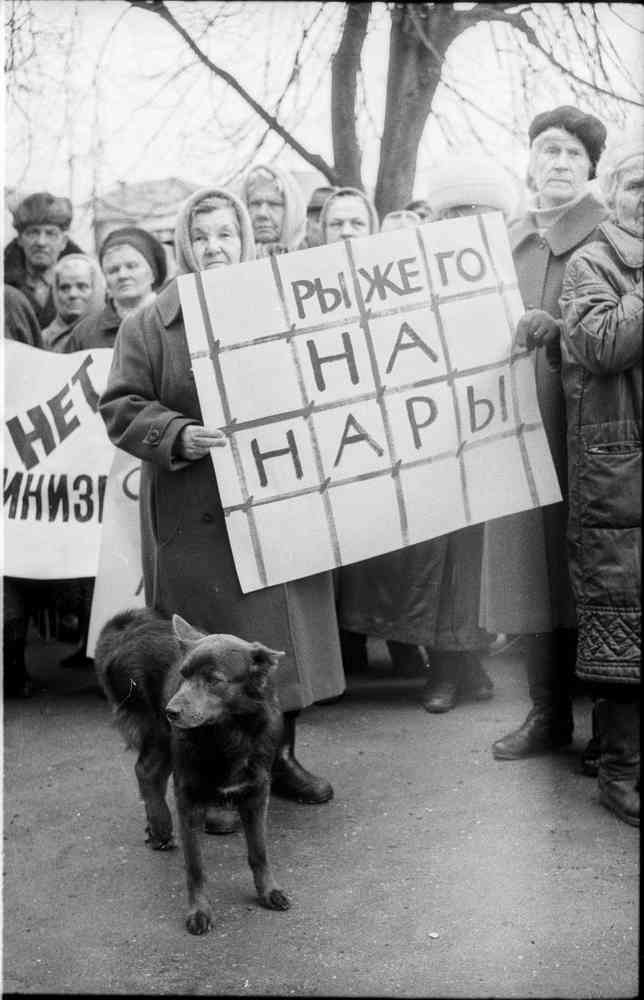
Russians protest the economic depression caused by the reforms with the banner saying: "Jail the redhead!", 1998.

Structural reform and a severe devaluation of the ruble lowered the standard of living for most segments of the Russian population. As a result, there was powerful political opposition to reform. Democratization opened the political channels for venting these frustrations, which translated into votes for anti-reform candidates, especially those of the Communist Party of the Russian Federation and its allies in the Duma. Russian voters, able to vote for opposition parties in the 1990s, often rejected economic reforms and yearned for the stability and personal security of the Soviet era. These were the groups that had enjoyed the benefits of Soviet-era state-controlled wages and prices, high state spending to subsidize priority sectors of the economy, protection from competition with foreign industries, and welfare entitlement programs. During the Yeltsin years in the 1990s, these anti-reformist groups were well organized, voicing their opposition to reform through strong trade unions, associations of directors of state-owned firms, and political parties in the popularly elected parliament whose primary constituencies were among those vulnerable to reform. A constant theme of Russian history in the 1990s was the conflict between economic reformers and those hostile to the new capitalism.

In the 1990s, former Soviet bureaucrats, factory directors, aggressive businessmen and criminal organizations used insider deals, bribery and simple brute force in order to grab lucrative assets, which were previously state-owned. Russia's new "capitalists" spent millions of dollars for protection. However, almost every business in Russia, from curbside vendors to huge oil and gas companies, made payments to the organized crime for protection ("krysha"). Businessmen said that they needed the "krysha" because the laws and the court system were not functioning properly in Russia. The only way for them to enforce a contract was to turn to a criminal "krysha". They also used it to intimidate competitors, collect debts or take over new markets. It was also increasingly common for businesses to turn to the "red krysha" — corrupt police who ran protection rackets. Within this system, a sharp rise in contract killings developed.

== Crisis ==
=== Constitutional crisis ===
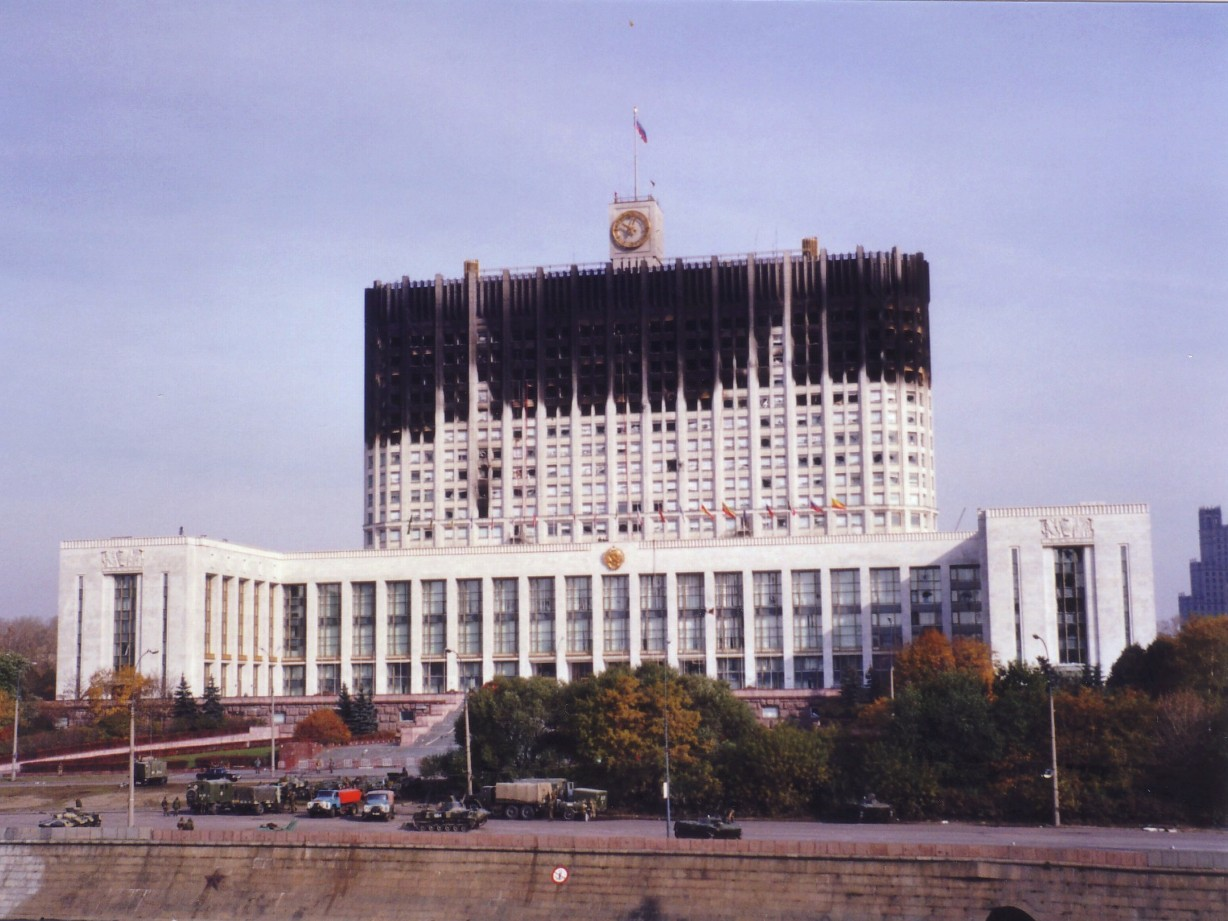
Burned facade of the White House after the storming

The struggle for the center of power in Soviet Russia following the collapse of the Soviet Union and for the nature of the economic reforms culminated in a political crisis and bloodshed in the autumn of 1993. Yeltsin, who represented a course of radical privatization, was opposed by the Supreme Soviet. Confronted with opposition to the presidential power of decree and threatened with impeachment, he "dissolved" the parliament on 21 September, in contravention of the existing constitution, and ordered new elections and a referendum on a new constitution. The parliament then declared Yeltsin deposed and appointed Aleksandr Rutskoy acting president on 22 September. Tensions built quickly, and matters came to a head after street riots on 2 – 3 October. On 4 October, Yeltsin ordered Special Forces and elite army units to storm the parliament building, the "White House" as it is called. With tanks thrown against the small-arms fire of the parliamentary defenders, the outcome was not in doubt. Rutskoy, Ruslan Khasbulatov, and the other parliamentary supporters surrendered and were immediately arrested and jailed. The official count was 147 dead, 437 wounded (with several men killed and wounded on the presidential side).

Results of the 1993 legislative election in the Russian Federation by the most voted party in the regions: dark blue - Liberal Democratic Party, light blue - Choice of Russia, red - Communist Party, yellow - Agrarian Party, orange - Party of Russian Unity and Accord, green - Democratic Party

The first State Duma from 1993 to 1995

Thus the transitional period in post-Soviet Russian politics came to an end. A new constitution was approved by referendum in December 1993. Russia was given a strongly presidential system. Radical privatization went ahead. Although the old parliamentary leaders were released without trial on 26 February 1994, they would not play an open role in politics thereafter. Though its clashes with the executive would eventually resume, the remodeled Russian parliament had greatly circumscribed powers. (For details on the constitution passed in 1993 see Constitution and government structure of Russia.)

=== Parliamentary life under the new Constitution ===
The first parliamentary elections took place on 12 December 1993. A far-right Liberal Democratic Party led by Zhirinovsky achieved the most votes (21.35%, 64 seats), after which pro-Yeltsin Choice of Russia led by former acting Prime Minister Yegor Gaidar won 14.45% with 62 seats, Communist Party under Zyuganov 11.55% with 42 seats, Agrarian Party under Mikhail Lapshin 7.44% with 38 seats, Yavlinsky-Boldyrev-Lukin Bloc 7.32% with 27 seats, Women of Russia under Alevtina Fedulova 7.57 with 24 seats, Party of Russian Unity and Accord under Sergey Shakhray 6.27% with 22 seats, Democratic Party of Russia under Nikolay Travkin 5.15% with 15 seats, and Civic Union under Arkady Volsky 1.80% with 7 seats with election having 54.33% turnout.

This result was an opposition-dominated State Duma which was in visible conflict with President Yeltsin.

=== First Chechen War ===
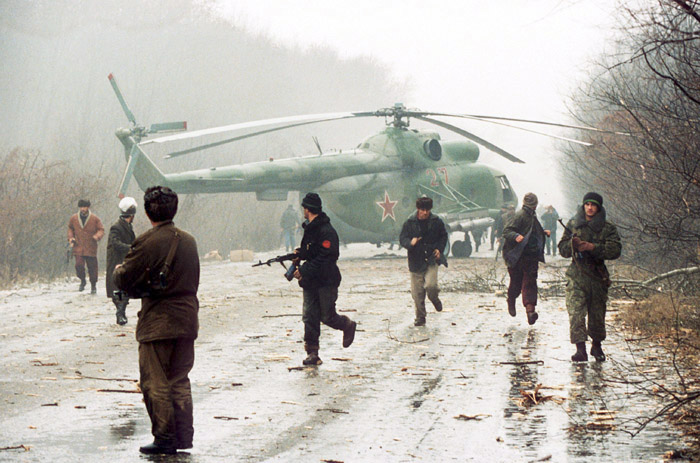
A Russian Mil Mi-8 helicopter brought down by Chechen insurgents near Grozny in 1994

In 1994, Yeltsin dispatched 40,000 troops to the southern region of Chechnya to prevent its secession from Russia. Living 1,000 miles (1,600 km) south of Moscow, the predominantly Muslim Chechens for centuries had gloried in defying Russia. Dzhokhar Dudayev, Chechnya's nationalist president, was driven to take his republic out of the Russian Federation, declaring independence in 1991. Gripped by the chaos of the Soviet Union's ongoing dissolution, Chechnya initially operated as a de facto independent nation-though this status was never recognized by Russia. In 1994, the Russian Armed Forces invaded and quickly became submerged in a military quagmire. In January 1995, the Russian army and air force commenced a siege of the Chechen capital of Grozny; about 25,000 Chechen civilians died under week-long air raids and artillery fire in the sealed-off city. Massive use of artillery and air-strikes remained the dominating strategy throughout the Russian campaign. Even so, Chechen forces seized thousands of Russian hostages, while inflicting humiliating losses on the demoralized and ill-equipped Russian troops.

The Russians finally managed to gain control of Grozny by February 1995 after heavy fighting. In August 1996, Yeltsin agreed to a ceasefire with Chechen leaders, and a peace treaty was formally signed in May 1997. However, the conflict resumed in 1999; this time the rebellion was crushed by Vladimir Putin.

=== Rise of the oligarchs ===
The new capitalist opportunities presented by the opening of the Russian economy in the late 1980s and early 1990s affected many people's interests. As the Soviet system was being dismantled, well-placed bosses and technocrats in the Communist Party, KGB, and Komsomol (Soviet Youth League) were cashing in on their Soviet-era power and privileges. Some quietly liquidated the assets of their organization and secreted the proceeds in overseas accounts and investments. Others created banks and business in Russia, taking advantage of their insider positions to win exclusive government contracts and licenses and to acquire financial credits and supplies at artificially low, state-subsidized prices in order to transact business at high, market-value prices. Great fortunes were made almost overnight.

Between 1987 and 1992, trading of natural resources and foreign currencies, as well as imports of highly demanded consumer goods and then domestic production of their rudimentary substitutes, rapidly enabled these pioneering entrepreneurs to accumulate considerable wealth. In turn, the emerging cash-based, highly opaque markets provided a breeding ground for a large number of racket gangs.

By the mid-1990s, the best-connected former nomenklatura leaders accumulated considerable financial resources, while on the other hand, the most successful entrepreneurs became acquainted with government officials and public politicians. The privatization of state enterprises was a unique opportunity because it gave many of those who had gained wealth in the early 1990s a chance to convert it into shares of privatized enterprises.

The Yeltsin government hoped to use privatization to spread ownership of shares in former state enterprises as widely as possible to create political support for his government and his reforms. The government used a system of free vouchers as a way to give mass privatization a jump-start. But it also allowed people to purchase shares of stock in privatized enterprises with cash. Even though initially each citizen received a voucher of equal face value, within months most of the vouchers converged in the hands of intermediaries who were ready to buy them for cash right away.

As the government ended the voucher privatization phase and launched cash privatization, it devised a program that it thought would simultaneously speed up privatization and yield the government a much-needed infusion of cash for its operating needs. Under the scheme, which quickly became known in the West as "loans for shares," the Yeltsin regime auctioned off substantial packages of stock shares in some of its most desirable enterprises, such as energy, telecommunications, and metallurgical firms, as collateral for bank loans.

In exchange for the loans, the state handed over assets worth many times as much. Under the terms of the deals, if the Yeltsin government did not repay the loans by September 1996, the lender acquired title to the stock and could then resell it or take an equity position in the enterprise. The first auctions were held in the fall of 1995. The auctions themselves were usually held in such a way so to limit the number of banks bidding for shares and thus to keep the auction prices extremely low. By summer 1996, major packages of shares in some of Russia's largest firms had been transferred to a small number of major banks, thus allowing a handful of powerful banks to acquire substantial ownership shares over major firms at shockingly low prices. These deals were effectively giveaways of valuable state assets to a few powerful, well-connected, and wealthy financial groups.

The concentration of financial and industrial power facilitated by the loans-for-shares program also extended to the mass media. Boris Berezovsky, who held significant interests in several banks and companies, also exercised considerable influence over state television programming for a period. Berezovsky and other wealthy businessmen with extensive interests in finance, industry, energy, telecommunications, and the media became widely known as the "Russian oligarchs". Among the prominent business figures associated with this group were Mikhail Khodorkovsky, Roman Abramovich, Vladimir Potanin, Vladimir Bogdanov, Rem Viakhirev, Vagit Alekperov, Viktor Chernomyrdin, Viktor Vekselberg, and Mikhail Fridman.

A tiny clique who used their connections built up during the last days of the Soviet years to appropriate Russia's vast resources during the rampant privatizations of the Yeltsin years, the oligarchs emerged as the most hated men in the nation. The Western world generally advocated a quick dismantling of the Soviet planned economy to make way for free-market reforms but later expressed disappointment over the newfound power and corruption of the oligarchs.

Results of the 1995 legislative election in the Russian Federation by the most voted party in the regions: light red - Communist Party, light blue - Liberal Democratic Party, dark blue - Our Home – Russia, light green - Yabloko, yellow - Agrarian Party, dark green - Transformation of the Fatherland, dark red - Derzhava

=== Presidential election of 1996 ===
The second State Duma from 1995 to 1999

==== Campaigns ====
Early in the campaign it had been thought that Yeltsin, who was in uncertain health (after recuperating from a series of heart attacks) and whose behavior was sometimes erratic, had little chance for reelection. When campaigning opened at the beginning of 1996, Yeltsin's popularity was close to zero. Meanwhile, the opposition Communist Party of the Russian Federation had already gained ground in parliamentary voting on 17 December 1995, and its candidate, Gennady Zyuganov, had a strong grassroots organization, especially in the rural areas and small towns, and appealed effectively to memories of the old days of Soviet prestige on the international stage and the socialist domestic order (22.30 with 157 seats). Apart from him, pro-Yeltsin Our Home – Russia led by Prime Minister Viktor Chernomyrdin received 10.13% and 55 seats, Liberal Democratic Party with 11.18% and 64 seats, Yabloko with 7.32% and 45 seats.

Panic struck the Yeltsin team when opinion polls suggested that the ailing president could not win; members of his entourage urged him to cancel presidential elections and effectively rule as dictator from then on. Instead, Yeltsin changed his campaign team, assigning a key role to his daughter, Tatyana Dyachenko, and appointing Anatoly Chubais campaign manager. Chubais, who was not just Yeltsin's campaign manager but also the architect of Russia's privatization program, set out to use his control of the privatization program as the key instrument of Yeltsin's reelection campaign.

In addition, American lobbyists spent millions of dollars to see Yeltsin elected.

The president's inner circle assumed that it had only a short time in which to act on privatization; it, therefore, needed to take steps that would have a large and immediate impact, making the reversal of reform prohibitively costly for their opponents. Chubais' solution was to co-opt potentially powerful interests, including enterprise directors and regional officials, in order to ensure Yeltsin's reelection.

The position of the enterprise directors to the program was essential to maintaining economic and social stability in the country. The managers represented one of the most powerful collective interests in the country; it was the enterprise managers who could ensure that labor did not erupt in a massive wave of strikes. The government, therefore, did not strenuously resist the tendency for voucher privatization to turn into "insider privatization", as it was termed, in which senior enterprise officials acquired the largest proportion of shares in privatized firms. Thus, Chubais allowed well-connected employees to acquire majority stakes in the enterprises. This proved to be the most widely used form of privatization in Russia. Three-quarters of privatized enterprises opted for this method, most often using vouchers. Real control thus wound up in the hands of the managers.

Results of the first round of the 1996 Russian presidential elections, 3 July 1996. Provinces with majority won by Yeltsin in black, provinces with majority won by Zyuganov in red.

Support from the oligarchs was also crucial to Yeltsin's reelection campaign. The "loans for shares" giveaway took place in the run-up to the 1996 presidential election—at a point when it had appeared that Zyuganov might defeat Yeltsin. Yeltsin and his entourage gave the oligarchs an opportunity to scoop up some of Russia's most desirable assets in return for their help in his reelection effort. The oligarchs, in turn, reciprocated the favor.

In the spring of 1996, with Yeltsin's popularity at a low ebb, Chubais and Yeltsin recruited a team of six leading Russian financiers and media barons (all oligarchs) who bankrolled the Yeltsin campaign with $3 million and guaranteed coverage on television and in leading newspapers directly serving the president's campaign strategy. The media painted a picture of a fateful choice for Russia, between Yeltsin and a "return to totalitarianism." The oligarchs even played up the threat of civil war if a Communist were elected president.

In the outlying regions of the country, the Yeltsin campaign relied on its ties to other allies—the patron-client ties of the local governors, most of whom had been appointed by the president.

The Zyuganov campaign had a strong grass-roots organization, but it was simply no match for the financial resources and access to patronage that the Yeltsin campaign could marshal.

Results of the second round of the 1996 Russian presidential elections, 3 July 1996. Provinces with majority won by Yeltsin in black, provinces with majority won by Zyuganov in red.

Yeltsin campaigned energetically, dispelling concerns about his health, exploiting all the advantages of incumbency to maintain a high media profile. To assuage voters' discontent, he made the claim that he would abandon some unpopular economic reforms and boost welfare spending, end the war in Chechnya, pay wage and pension arrears, and abolish military conscription (he did not live up to his promises after the election, except for ending the Chechen war, which was halted for 3 years). Yeltsin's campaign also got a boost from the announcement of a $10 billion loan to the Russian government from the International Monetary Fund.

Grigory Yavlinsky was the liberal alternative to Yeltsin and Zyuganov. He appealed to a well-educated middle class that saw Yeltsin as an incompetent alcoholic and Zyuganov as a Soviet-era throwback. Seeing Yavlinsky as a threat, Yeltsin's inner circle of supporters worked to bifurcate political discourse, thus excluding a middle ground—and convince voters that only Yeltsin could defeat the Communist "menace." The election became a two-man race, and Zyuganov, who lacked Yeltsin's resources and financial backing, watched helplessly as his strong initial lead was whittled away.

==== Elections ====
Voter turnout in the first round of the polling on 16 June was 69.8%. According to returns announced on 17 June, Yeltsin won 35% of the vote; Zyuganov won 32%; Aleksandr Lebed, a populist ex-general, a surprisingly high 14.5%; liberal candidate Grigory Yavlinsky 7.4%; far-right nationalist Vladimir Zhirinovsky 5.8%; and former Soviet president Mikhail Gorbachev 0.5%. With no candidate securing an absolute majority, Yeltsin and Zyuganov went into a second round of voting. In the meantime, Yeltsin co-opted a large segment of the electorate by appointing Lebed to the posts of national security adviser and secretary of the Security Council.

In the end, Yeltsin's election tactics paid off. In the run-off on 3 July, with a turnout of 68.9%, Yeltsin won 53.8% of the vote and Zyuganov 40.3%, with the rest (5.9%) voting "against all". Moscow and Saint Petersburg (formerly Leningrad) together provided over half of the incumbent president's support, but he also did well in large cities in the Urals and in the north and northeast. Yeltsin lost to Zyuganov in Russia's southern industrial heartland. The southern stretch of the country became known as the "red belt", underscoring the resilience of the Communist Party in elections since the breakup of the Soviet Union.

Although Yeltsin promised that he would abandon his unpopular neoliberal austerity policies and increase public spending to help those suffering from the pain of capitalist reforms, within a month of his election, Yeltsin issued a decree canceling almost all of these promises.

Right after the election, Yeltsin's physical health and mental stability were increasingly precarious. Many of his executive functions thus devolved upon a group of advisers (most of whom had close links with the oligarchs).

It was also the only Russian presidential election that included a matchup in a second round.

=== Financial collapse ===
The global recession of 1998, which started with the Asian financial crisis in July 1997, exacerbated Russia's continuing economic crisis. Given the ensuing decline in world commodity prices, countries heavily dependent on the export of raw materials such as oil were among those most severely hit. Oil, natural gas, metals, and timber account for more than 80% of Russian exports, leaving the country vulnerable to swings in world prices. Oil is also a major source of government tax revenue which brought significant negative implications for Russia's fiscal situation, foreign exchange stores and ultimately, the value of the ruble.

The pressures on the ruble, reflecting the weakness of the economy, resulted in a disastrous fall in the value of the currency. Massive tax evasion continued and accelerated due to financial instability and decreasing government capacity. This further decreased government revenues and soon, the central government found itself unable to service the massive loans it had accumulated and ultimately was even unable to pay its employees. The government stopped making timely payment of wages, pensions, and debts to suppliers; and when workers were paid, it was often with bartered goods rather than rubles. Coal miners were especially hard hit, and for several weeks in the summer they blocked sections of the Trans-Siberian railroad with protests, effectively cutting the country in two. As time wore on, they added calls for the resignation of Yeltsin in addition to their demands for wages.

A political crisis came to a head in March when Yeltsin suddenly dismissed Prime Minister Viktor Chernomyrdin and his entire cabinet on 23 March. Yeltsin named a virtually unknown technocrat, Energy Minister Sergei Kiriyenko, aged 35, as acting prime minister. Russian observers expressed doubts about Kiriyenko's youth and inexperience. The Duma rejected his nomination twice. Only after a month-long standoff, during which Yeltsin threatened to dissolve the legislature, did the Duma confirm Kiriyenko on a third vote on 24 April.

Kiriyenko appointed a new cabinet strongly committed to stemming the fall in the value of Russia's currency. The oligarchs strongly supported Kiriyenko's efforts to maintain the exchange rate. A high exchange rate meant that they needed fewer rubles to buy imported goods, especially luxury items.

In an effort to prop up the currency and stem the flight of capital, Kiriyenko hiked interest rates to 150% in order to attract buyers for government bonds. But concerns about the financial crisis in Asia and the slump in world oil prices were already prompting investors to withdraw from Russia. By mid-1998, it was clear Russia would need help from IMF to maintain its exchange rate.

The Russian crisis caused alarm in the West. Pouring more money into the Russian economy would not be a long-term solution, but the U.S. in particular feared that Yeltsin's government would not survive a looming financial crisis without IMF help. U.S. President Bill Clinton's treasury secretary, Robert Rubin, also feared that a Russian collapse could create a panic on world money markets (and it indeed did help bring down one major US hedge fund Long-Term Capital Management). The IMF approved a $22.6 billion emergency loan on 13 July.

Despite the bailout, Russia's monthly interest payments still well exceeded its monthly tax revenues. Realizing that this situation was unsustainable, investors continued to flee Russia despite the IMF bailout. Weeks later the financial crisis resumed and the value of the ruble resumed its fall, and the government fell into a self-perpetuating trap. To pay off the interest on the loans it had taken, it needed to raise still more cash, which it did through foreign borrowing. As lenders became increasingly certain that the government could not make good on its obligations, they demanded ever-higher interest rates, deepening the trap. Ultimately the bubble burst.

On 17 August, Kiriyenko's government and the central bank were forced to suspend payment on Russia's foreign debt for 90 days, restructure the nation's entire debt, and devalue the ruble. The ruble went into free fall as Russians sought frantically to buy dollars. Western creditors lost heavily, and a large part of Russia's fledgling banking sector was destroyed, since many banks had substantial dollar borrowings. Foreign investment rushed out of the country, and financial crisis triggered an unprecedented flight of capital from Russia.

==== Political fallout ====
The financial collapse produced a political crisis, as Yeltsin, with his domestic support evaporating, had to contend with an emboldened opposition in the parliament. A week later, on 23 August, Yeltsin fired Kiryenko and declared his intention of returning Chernomyrdin to office as the country slipped deeper into economic turmoil. Powerful business interests, fearing another round of reforms that might cause leading concerns to fail, welcomed Kiriyenko's fall, as did the Communists.

Yeltsin, who began to lose his hold as his health deteriorated, wanted Chernomyrdin back, but the legislature refused to give its approval. After the Duma rejected Chernomyrdin's candidacy twice, Yeltsin, his power clearly on the wane, backed down. Instead, he nominated Foreign Minister Yevgeny Primakov, who on 11 September was overwhelmingly approved by the State Duma.

Primakov's appointment restored political stability because he was seen as a compromise candidate able to heal the rifts between Russia's quarreling interest groups. There was popular enthusiasm for Primakov as well. Primakov promised to make the payment of wage and pension arrears his government's first priority, and invited members of the leading parliamentary factions into his Cabinet.

Communists and trade unionists staged a nationwide strike on 7 October, and called on President Yeltsin to resign. On 9 October, Russia, which was also suffering from a bad harvest, appealed for international humanitarian aid, including food.

1999 Russian legislative election map by most voted political party in each federal subject: dark blue - Unity, light blue - Fatherland – All Russia, red - Communist Party

==== Recovery ====
Russia bounced back from the August 1998 financial crash with surprising speed. Much of the reason for the recovery is that world oil prices rapidly rose during 1999–2000 (just as falling energy prices on the world market

1999 Russian legislative election map by most voted political party in each federal district: dark blue - Unity, lighter blue - Fatherland – All Russia, the lightest blue - Union of Right Forces, yellow - Liberal Democratic Party, orange - Our Home – Russia, light green - Yabloko

had deepened Russia's financial troubles) so that Russia ran a large trade surplus in 1999 and 2000. Another reason is that domestic industries such as food processing have benefited from the devaluation, which caused a steep increase in the prices of imported goods. Also, since Russia's economy was operating to such a large extent on barter and other non-monetary instruments of exchange, the financial collapse had far less of an impact on many producers than it would have, had the economy been dependent on a banking system. Finally, the economy has been helped by an infusion of cash; as

enterprises were able to pay off arrears in back wages and taxes, it, in turn, allowed consumer demand for the goods and services of Russian industry to rise. For the first time in many years, unemployment in 2000 fell as enterprises added workers.

The third State Duma of 1999-2003

Nevertheless, the political and social equilibrium of the country remains tenuous into the 2020s. The economy remains vulnerable to downturn if, for instance, world oil prices fall at a dramatic pace.

=== Succession crisis ===
Yevgeny Primakov did not remain in his post long. Yeltsin grew suspicious that Primakov was gaining in strength and popularity and dismissed him in May 1999, after only eight months in office. Yeltsin then named Sergei Stepashin, who had formerly been head of the FSB (the successor agency to the KGB) and later been Interior Minister, to replace him. The Duma confirmed his appointment on the first ballot by a wide margin.

Official results of the 2000 presidential election by federal subjects: blue - Vladimir Putin, red - Gennady Zyuganov, gray - Aman Tuleyev

Stepashin's tenure was even shorter than Primakov's. In August 1999, Yeltsin once again abruptly dismissed the government and named Vladimir Putin as his candidate to head the new government. Like Stepashin, Putin had a background in the secret police, having made his career in the foreign intelligence service and later as head of the FSB. Yeltsin went so far as to declare that he saw Putin as his successor as president. The Duma narrowly voted to confirm Putin.

When appointed, Putin was a relatively unknown politician, but he quickly established himself both in public opinion and in Yeltsin's estimation as a trusted head of government, largely due to the Second Chechen War. Just days after Yeltsin named Putin as a candidate for prime minister, Chechen

Unofficial results of the 2000 presidential election according to anti-Putin opposition

forces engaged the Russian army in Dagestan, a Russian autonomy near Chechnya. In the next month, several hundred people died in apartment building bombings in Moscow and other cities, bombings Russian authorities attributed to Chechen rebels. In response, the Russian army entered Chechnya in late September 1999, starting the Second Chechen War. The Russian public at the time, angry over the terrorist bombings, widely supported the war. The support translated into growing popularity for Putin, who had taken decisive action in Chechnya.

The official 2000 Russian presidential election results in the federal districts: blue - Vladimir Putin, red - Gennady Zyuganov, gray - Aman Tuleyev, yellow - Konstantin Titov

After the success of political forces close to Putin on 19 December 1999 parliamentary elections (while Communist Party was at the first place with 24.29% and 113 seats, pro-Yeltsin and pro-Putin Unity received 23.32% and 73 seats, after which opposition Fatherland – All Russia achieved 13.33% with 68 seats, pro-reform Union of Right Forces with 8.52% and 29 seats, pro-reform but anti-Yeltsin Yabloko with 5.93% and 20 seats, Liberal Democratic Party with 5.98% and 17 seats, pro-government Our Home – Russia with 1.19 and 7 seats, opposition Movement in Support of the Army with 0.58% and 2 seats, and nationalist Russian All-People's Union with 0.37% and 2 seats), Yeltsin evidently felt confident enough in Putin that he resigned from the presidency on 31 December, six months before his term was due to expire. This made Putin acting president and gave Putin ample opportunity to position himself as the frontrunner for the Russian presidential election held on 26 March 2000, which he won already in the first round (53.44%, while Zyuganov achieved 29.49% and Yavlinsky 5.85%). The Chechen War figured prominently in the campaign. In February 2000, Russian troops entered Grozny, the Chechen capital, and a week before the election, Putin flew to Chechnya on a fighter jet, claiming victory.

== Putin era ==
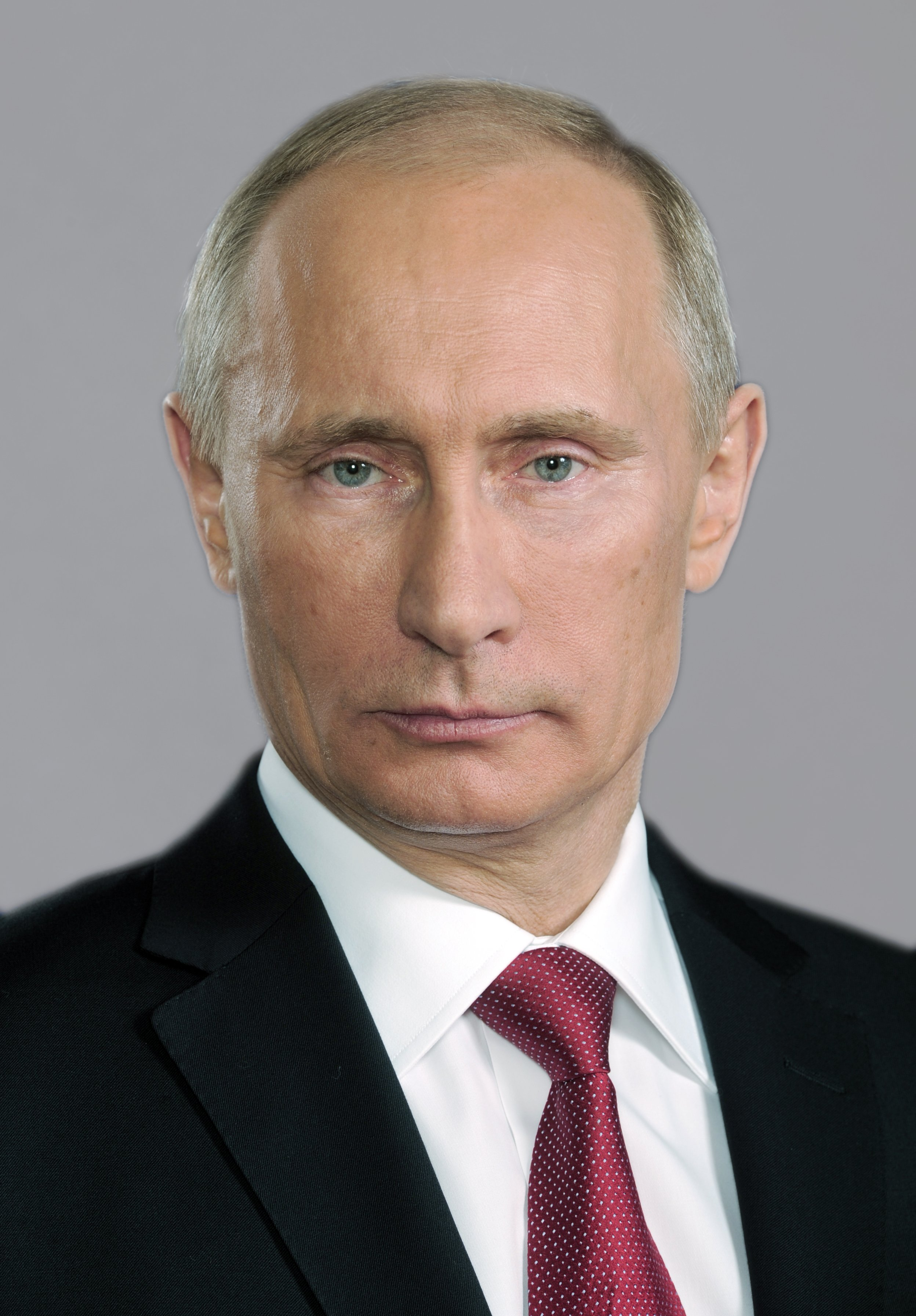
Vladimir Putin, 2012

In August 2000, the Russian submarine K-141 Kursk suffered an explosion, causing the submarine to sink in the shallow area of the Barents Sea. Russia organized a vigorous but hectic attempt to save the crew, and the entire futile effort was surrounded by unexplained secrecy. This, as well as the slow initial reaction to the event and especially to the offers of foreign aid in saving the crew, brought much criticism on the government and personally on President Putin.

On 23 October 2002, Chechen separatists took over a Moscow theater. Over 700 people inside were taken hostage in what has been called the Moscow theater hostage crisis. The separatists demanded the immediate withdrawal of Russian forces from Chechnya and threatened to blow up the building if authorities attempted to enter. Three days later, Russian commandos stormed the building after the hostages had been subdued with a sleeping gas, shooting the unconscious militants, and killing over 100 civilian hostages with the sleeping gas in the process.

In the aftermath of the theater siege, Putin began renewed efforts to eliminate the Chechen insurrection. (For additional details on the war in Chechnya under Putin, see Second Chechen War.) The government canceled scheduled troop withdrawals, surrounded Chechen refugee camps with soldiers, and increased the frequency of assaults on separatist positions.

Chechen militants responded in kind, stepping up guerrilla operations and rocket attacks on federal helicopters. Several high-profile attacks have taken place. In May 2004, Chechen separatists assassinated Akhmad Kadyrov, the pro-Russia Chechen leader who became the president of Chechnya 8 months earlier after an election conducted by Russian authorities. On 24 August 2004, two Russian aircraft were bombed. This was followed by the Beslan school hostage crisis in which Chechen separatists took 1,300 hostages. The initially high public support for the war in Chechnya has declined.

Putin has confronted several very influential oligarchs (Vladimir Gusinsky, Boris Berezovsky and Mikhail Khodorkovsky, in particular) who attained large stakes of state assets, allegedly through illegal schemes, during the privatization process. Gusinsky and Berezovsky have been forced to leave Russia and give up parts of their assets. Khodorkovsky was jailed in Russia and has lost his YUKOS company, formerly the largest oil producer in Russia. Putin's stand against oligarchs is generally popular with the Russian people, even though the jailing of Khodorkovsky was mainly seen as part of a takeover operation by government officials, according to another Levada-Center poll.

These confrontations have also led to Putin establishing control over Russian media outlets previously owned by the oligarchs, often independent of the Kremlin. In 2001 and 2002, TV channels NTV (previously owned by Gusinsky, known for broadcasting satire show Puppets which criticized and mocked Vladimir Putin and having pro-opposition stance), TV6 and TVS (owned by Berezovsky) were all taken over by media groups loyal to Putin. Similar takeovers have also occurred with print media.

2003 Russian legislative election map by most voted political party in each federal district: dark blue - United Russia, red - Communist Party, yellow - Rodina, light blue - Union of Right Forces, green - Agrarian Party, orange - Genuine Patriots

Pro-Putin United Russia party won the 2003 legislative election with 37.56% and 223 seats (a plurality, which if merged with Rodina that achieved 9.02% and 37 seats, gave the majority in the parliament), thus giving him unlimited and unchecked power. Opposition parties that entered the parliament included the "systemic opposition" Communist Party with 12.61% and 52 seats, Liberal Democratic Party with 11.35% and 36 seats, People's Party with 1.18% and 17 seats, while "non-systemic opposition" suffered electoral loses: Yabloko with 4.30% (under the electoral threshold) which only won 4 members of parliaments by constituencies. Similarly with the Union of Right Forces with 3.97% that only won 3 seats by constituencies, Party of Russia's Rebirth–Russian Party of Life of the previous Chairman of the State Duma Gennadiy Seleznyov with 1.88% and 3 seats by constituencies, and the Agrarian Party with 3.64% and onlym 2 seats by constituencies. The State Duma stopped to be a place of debate and turned into a rubber stamp.

Vladimir Putin's regime began to undermine judicial independence and gradually subordinated it to the Kremlin.

Putin's popularity, which stems from his reputation as a strong leader, stands in contrast to the unpopularity of his predecessor, but it hinges on a continuation of economic recovery. Putin came into office at an ideal time: after the devaluation of the ruble in 1998, which boosted demand for domestic goods, and while world oil prices were rising. Indeed, during the seven years of his presidency, real GDP grew on average 6.7% a year, average income increased 11% annually in real terms, and a consistently positive balance of the federal budget enabled the government to cut 70% of the external debt (according to the Institute for Complex Strategic Studies). Thus, many credited him with the recovery, but his ability to withstand a sudden economic downturn has been untested. Putin won the Russian presidential election in March 2004 without any significant competition.

Some researchers assert that most Russians (as of 2007) have come to regret the collapse of the Soviet Union in 1991. On repeated occasions, even Vladimir Putin—Boris Yeltsin's handpicked successor — stated that the fall of Soviet rule had led to few gains and many problems for most Russian citizens. In a campaign speech in February 2004, for example, Putin called the dismantlement of the Soviet Union a "national tragedy on an enormous scale," from which "only the elites and nationalists of the republics gained." He added, "I think that ordinary citizens of the former Soviet Union and the post-Soviet space gained nothing from this. On the contrary, people have faced a huge number of problems."

Putin's international prestige suffered a major blow in the West during the disputed 2004 Ukrainian presidential election. Putin had twice visited Ukraine before the election to show his support for the pro-Russian Viktor Yanukovych against opposition leader Viktor Yushchenko, a pro-Western liberal economist. He congratulated Yanukovych, followed shortly afterwards by Belarusian president Alexander Lukashenko, on his victory before election results were even made official and made statements opposing the rerun of the disputed second round of elections, won by Yanukovych, amid allegations of large-scale voting fraud. The second round was ultimately rerun; Yushchenko won the round and was eventually declared the winner on 10 January 2005. In the West, the reaction to Russia's handling of, or perhaps interference in, the Ukrainian election evoked echoes of the Cold War, but relations with the U.S. remained stable.

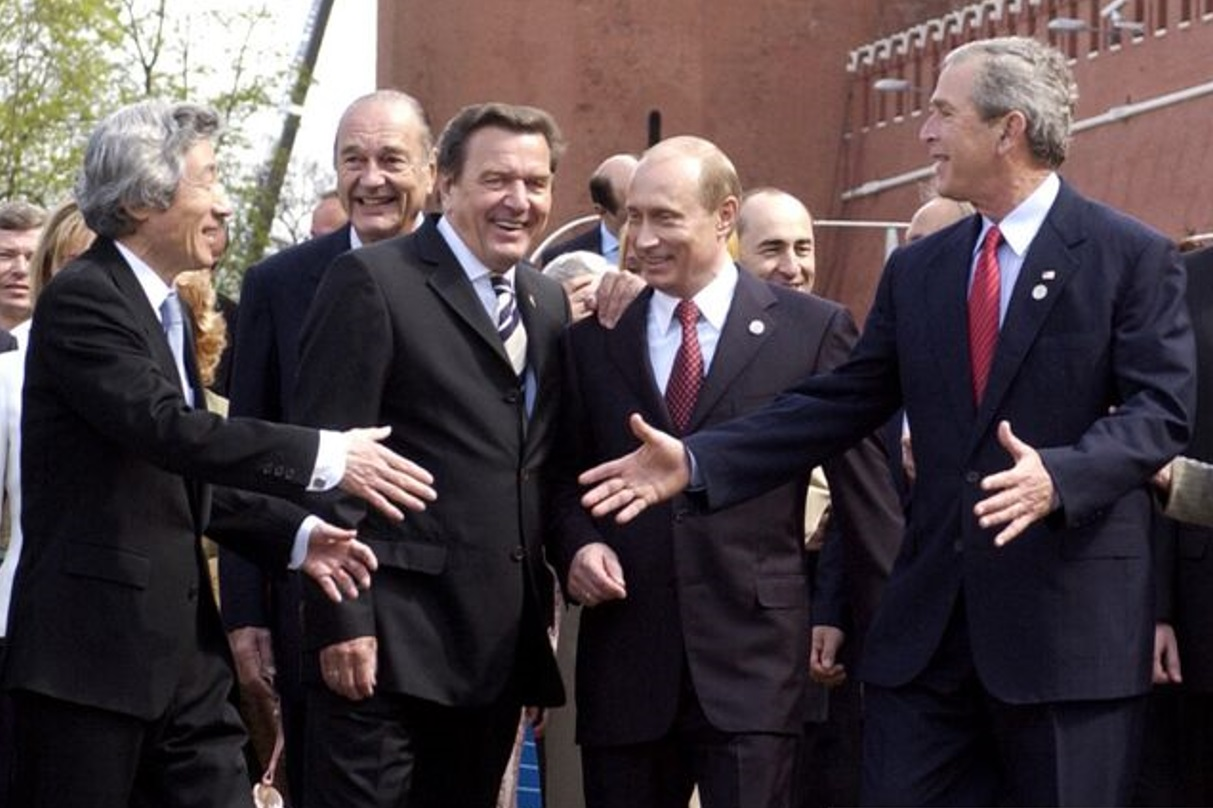
Vladimir Putin with Junichiro Koizumi, Jacques Chirac, Gerhard Schröder, Silvio Berlusconi, George W. Bush and other state leaders in Moscow, 9 May 2005

On 14 March 2004, Putin was elected to the presidency for a second term, receiving 71% of the vote. The Beslan school hostage crisis took place in September 2004, in which hundreds died. Many in the Russian press and in the international media warned that the death of 130 hostages in the special forces' rescue operation during the 2002 Moscow theater hostage crisis would severely damage President Putin's popularity. However, shortly after the siege had ended, the Russian president enjoyed record public approval ratings – 83% of Russians declared themselves satisfied with Putin and his handling of the siege.

In 2005, the Russian government replaced the broad in-kind Soviet-era benefits, such as free transportation and subsidies for heating and other utilities for socially vulnerable groups by cash payments. The reform, known as monetization, has been unpopular and caused a wave of demonstrations in various Russian cities, with thousands of retirees protesting against the loss of their benefits. This was the first time such wave of protests took place during the Putin administration. The reform hurt the popularity of the Russian government, but Putin personally remained popular, with a 77% approval rating.

The near 10-year period prior to the rise of Putin after the dissolution of Soviet rule was a time of upheaval in Russia. In a 2005 Kremlin speech, Putin characterized the collapse of the Soviet Union as the "greatest geopolitical catastrophe of the Twentieth Century." Putin elaborated: "Moreover, the epidemic of disintegration infected Russia itself." The country's cradle-to-grave social safety net was gone and life expectancy declined in the period preceding Putin's rule. In 2005, the National Priority Projects were launched to improve Russia's health care, education, housing and agriculture.

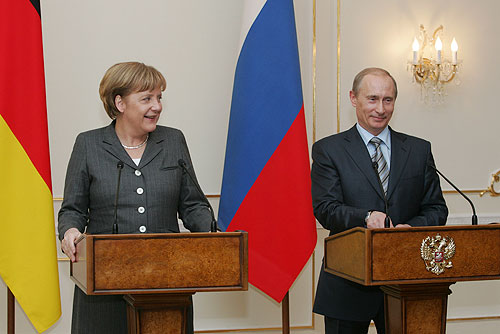
Putin with Chancellor of Germany Angela Merkel in March 2008

The continued criminal prosecution of Russia's then richest man, President of Yukos oil and gas company Mikhail Khodorkovsky, for fraud and tax evasion was seen by the international press as a retaliation for Khodorkovsky's donations to both liberal and communist opponents of the Kremlin. The government said that Khodorkovsky was "corrupting" a large segment of the Duma to prevent changes to the tax code. Khodorkovsky was arrested, Yukos was bankrupted and the company's assets were auctioned at below-market value, with the largest share acquired by the state company Rosneft. The fate of Yukos was seen as a sign of a broader shift of Russia towards a system of state capitalism. This was underscored in July 2014 when shareholders of Yukos were awarded $50 billion in compensation by the Permanent Arbitration Court in The Hague.

On 7 October 2006, Anna Politkovskaya, a journalist who exposed corruption in the Russian army and its conduct in Chechnya, was shot in the lobby of her apartment building, on Putin's birthday. The death of Politkovskaya triggered international criticism, with accusations that Putin has failed to protect the country's new independent media. Putin himself said that her death caused the government more problems than her writings.

In 2007, "Dissenters' Marches" were organized by the opposition group The Other Russia, led by former chess champion Garry Kasparov and national-Bolshevist leader Eduard Limonov. Following prior warnings, demonstrations in several Russian cities were met by police action, which included interfering with the travel of the protesters and the arrests of as many as 150 people who attempted to break through police lines.

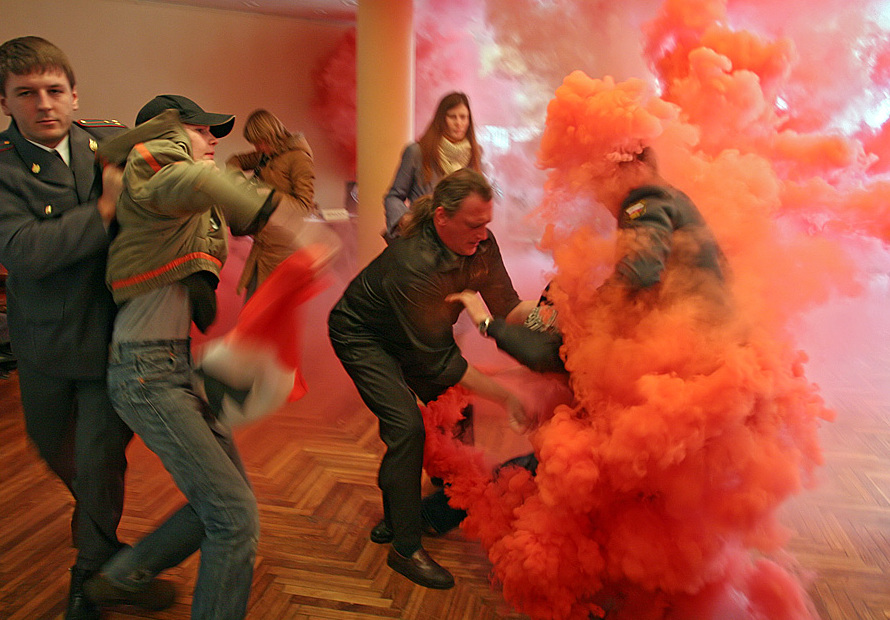
National Bolsheviks attack a polling station in Odintsovo, Moscow Oblast, during the 2007 Russian legislative election to protest the ban of the party

On 12 September 2007, Putin dissolved the government upon the request of Prime Minister Mikhail Fradkov. Fradkov commented that it was to give the President a "free hand" in the run-up to the parliamentary election. Viktor Zubkov was appointed the new prime minister.

In the December 2007 election, United Russia won 64.30% of the popular vote in their run for State Duma. This victory was seen by many as an indication of strong popular support of the then Russian leadership and its policies.

At the end of Putin's second term, Jonathan Steele has commented on Putin's legacy: "What, then, is Putin's legacy? Stability and growth, for starters. After the chaos of the 90s, highlighted by Yeltsin's attack on the Russian parliament with tanks in 1993 and the collapse of almost every bank in 1998, Putin has delivered political calm and a 7% annual rate of growth. Inequalities have increased and many of the new rich are grotesquely crass and cruel, but not all the Kremlin's vast revenues from oil and gas have gone into private pockets or are being hoarded in the government's "stabilisation fund". Enough has gone into modernising schools and hospitals so that people notice a difference. Overall living standards are up. The second Chechen war, the major blight on Putin's record, is almost over".

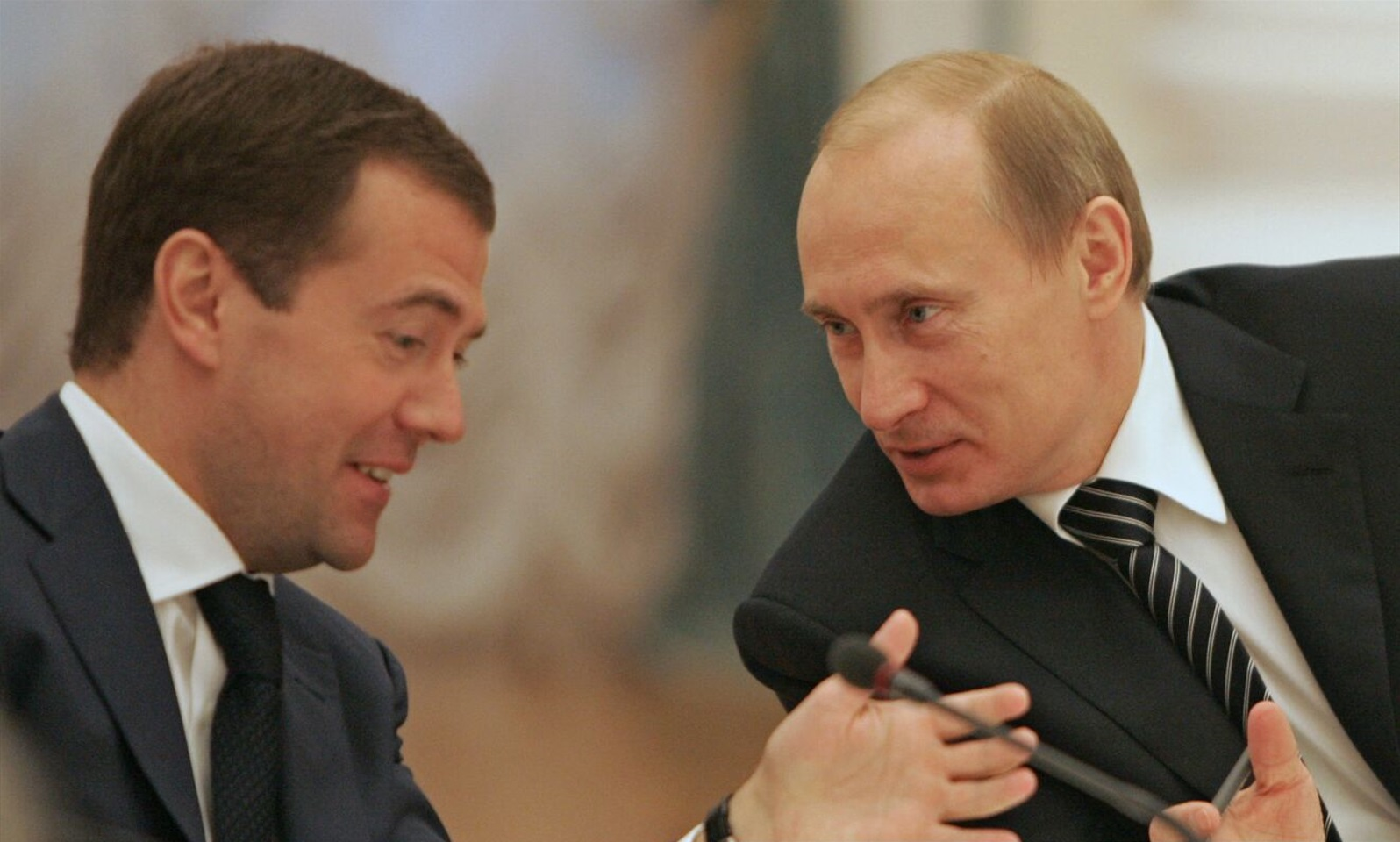
Putin with Dmitry Medvedev, March 2008

Putin was barred from a third term by the Constitution of Russia. First Deputy Prime Minister Dmitry Medvedev was elected his successor. In a power-switching operation on 8 May 2008, only a day after handing the presidency to Medvedev, Putin was appointed Prime Minister of Russia, maintaining his political dominance.

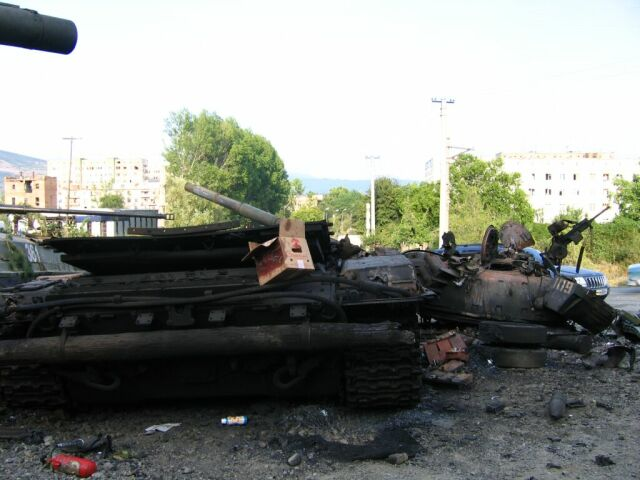
A destroyed Georgian tank in Tskhinvali, August 2008

In 2008, Kosovo's declaration of independence saw a marked deterioration in Russia's relationship with the West. It also saw South Ossetia war against Georgia, that followed Georgia's attempt to take over the breakaway region of South Ossetia. Russian troops entered South Ossetia and forced Georgian troops back, establishing their control on this territory. In the fall of 2008, Russia unilaterally recognized the independence of South Ossetia and Abkhazia.

Putin has said that overcoming the consequences of the world economic crisis was one of the two main achievements of his second Premiership. The other was the stabilizing the size of Russia's population between 2008 and 2011 following a long period of demographic collapse that began in the 1990s.

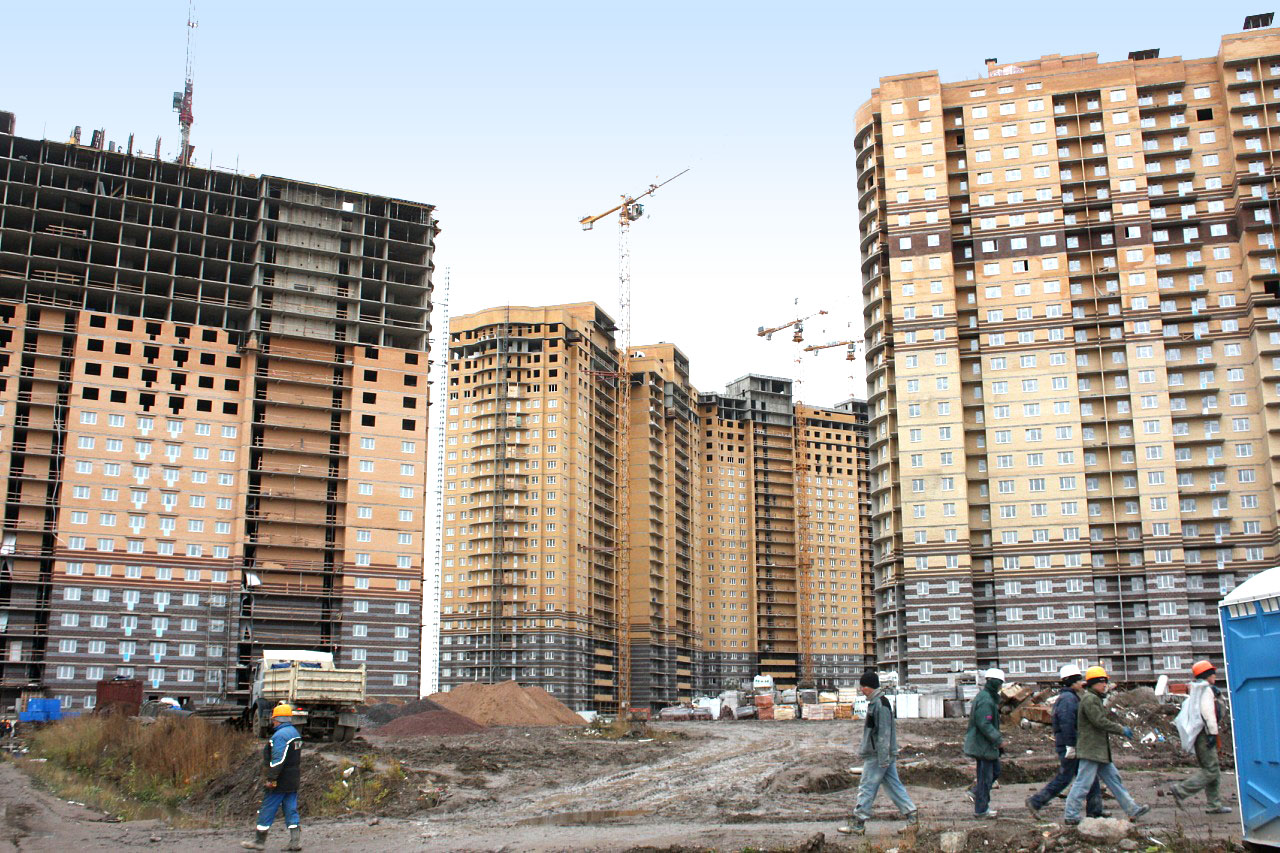
"Northern Valley" housing estate under construction in Saint Petersburg, 2010

At the United Russia Congress in Moscow on 24 September 2011, Medvedev officially proposed that Putin stand for the presidency in March 2012, an offer Putin accepted. Given United Russia's near-total dominance of Russian politics, many observers believed that Putin was assured of a third term. The move was expected to see Medvedev stand on the United Russia ticket in the parliamentary elections in December, with a goal of becoming prime minister at the end of his presidential term.

After the parliamentary elections on 4 December 2011, tens of thousands of Russians engaged in protests against alleged electoral fraud, the largest protests in Putin's time. Protesters criticized Putin and United Russia and demanded annulment of the election results. Those protests sparked the fear of a colour revolution in society. Putin allegedly organized a number of paramilitary groups loyal to himself and to the United Russia party in the period between 2005 and 2012.

On 4 March 2012, Putin won the 2012 Russian presidential elections in the first round, with 63.6% of the vote, despite widespread accusations of vote-rigging. Opposition groups accused Putin and United Russia of fraud. While efforts to make the elections transparent were publicized, including the usage of webcams in polling stations, the vote was criticized by the Russian opposition and by international observers from the Organization for Security and Co-operation in Europe for procedural irregularities.

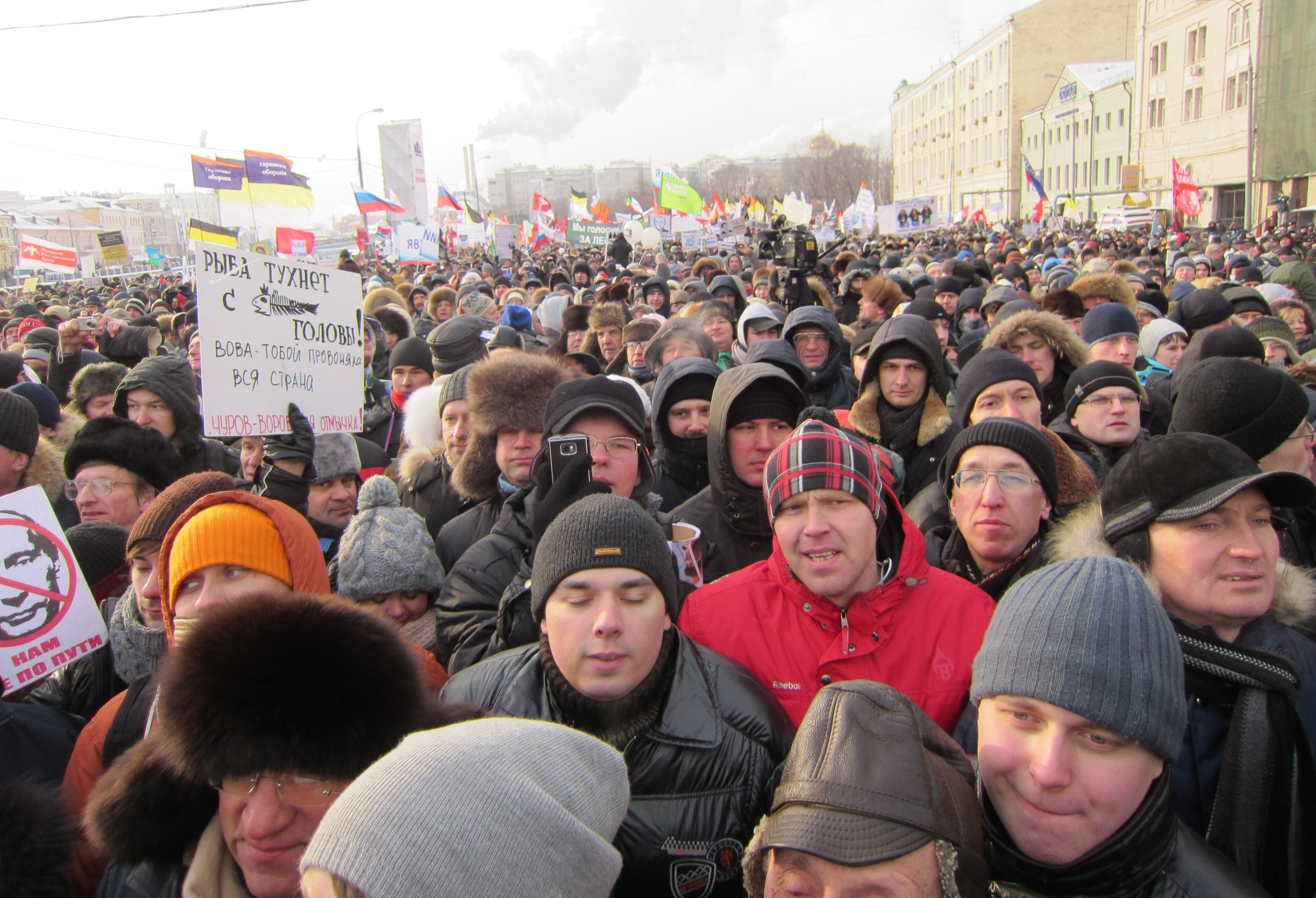
Anti-Putin protesters march in Moscow, 4 February 2012

Anti-Putin protests took place during and directly after the presidential campaign. The most notorious protest was the Pussy Riot performance on 21 February, and subsequent trial. An estimated 8,000–20,000 protesters gathered in Moscow on 6 May, when eighty people were injured in confrontations with police, and 450 were arrested, with another 120 arrests taking place the following day.

In 2012 and 2013, Putin and the United Russia party backed stricter legislation against the LGBT community, in Saint Petersburg, Arkhangelsk and Novosibirsk; a law called the Russian gay propaganda law, that is against "homosexual propaganda" (which prohibits such symbols as the rainbow flag as well as published works containing homosexual content) was adopted by the State Duma in June 2013. Responding to international concerns about Russia's legislation, Putin asked critics to note that the law was a "ban on the propaganda of pedophilia and homosexuality" and he stated that homosexual visitors to the 2014 Winter Olympics should "leave the children in peace" but denied there was any "professional, career or social discrimination" against homosexuals in Russia.

=== Russo-Ukrainian War ===
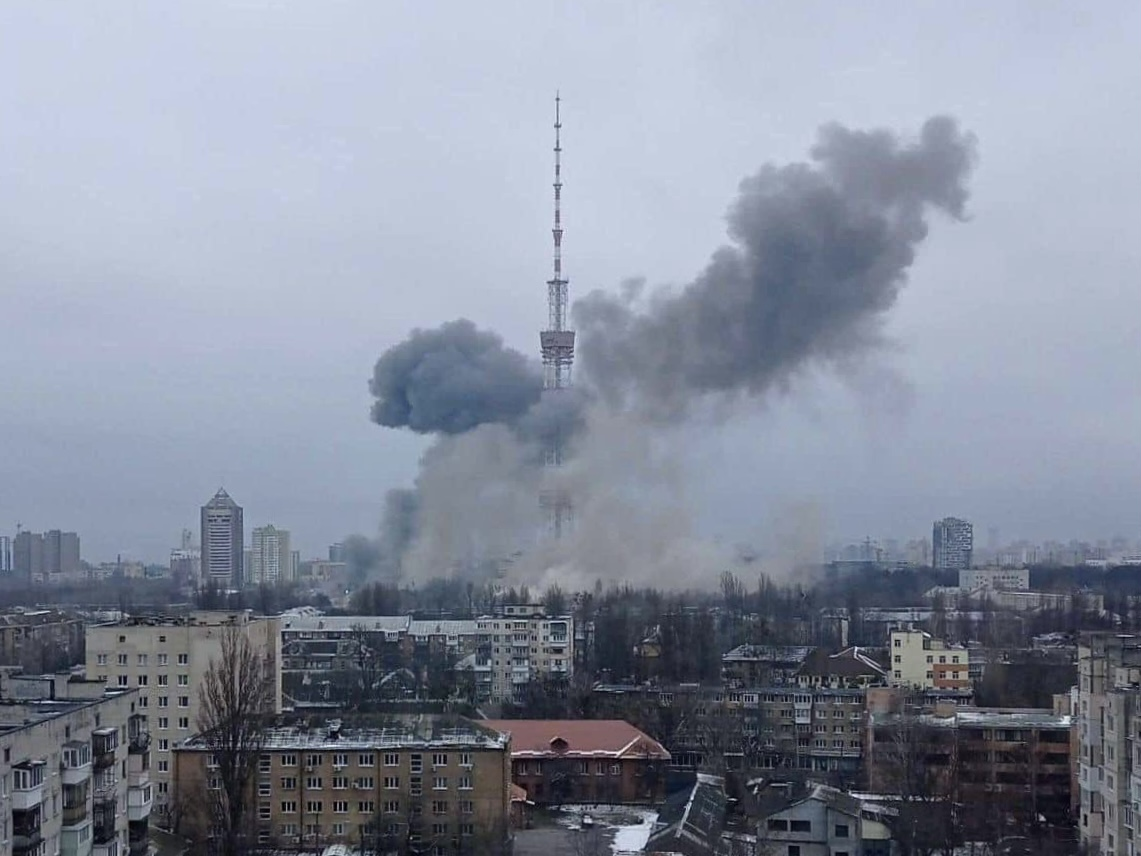
Scene of the Battle of Kyiv, 2022

On 22 February 2014, the Yanukovych government of Ukraine collapsed as a result of the Revolution of Dignity, which the Russian government called a foreign backed proxy movement. On the same day, according to Putin, he called an all-night meeting of his military leaders, at the end of which he ordered them to "begin the work to bring Crimea back into Russia." By 27 February, unmarked Russian troops in Ukraine were establishing a blockade of the borders and Ukrainian military bases in the Autonomous Republic of Crimea, and took armed control of its regional parliament.

A new Ukrainian government was formed and scheduled new elections for May 2014. On 1 March, from exile, Viktor Yanukovych requested that Russia use military forces "to establish legitimacy, peace, law and order, stability and defending the people of Ukraine". On the same day, Putin requested and received authorization from the Russian Parliament to deploy Russian troops to Ukraine in response to the crisis and gained complete control over Crimean Peninsula within a day.

On 6 March 2014, the Crimean Parliament voted to "enter into the Russian Federation with the rights of a subject of the Russian Federation" and later held a referendum asking the people of these regions whether they wanted to join Russia as a federal subject, or if they wanted to restore the 1992 Crimean constitution and Crimea's status as a part of Ukraine. Though passed with an overwhelming majority, the results are contested by some and approved by others. Crimea and Sevastopol formally declared independence as the Republic of Crimea and requested that they be admitted as constituents of the Russian Federation. On 18 March 2014, Russia and Crimea signed a treaty of accession of the Republic of Crimea and Sevastopol in the Russian Federation, while the United Nations General Assembly voted in favor of a non-binding Resolution 68/262 to oppose Russia's annexation of the peninsula.

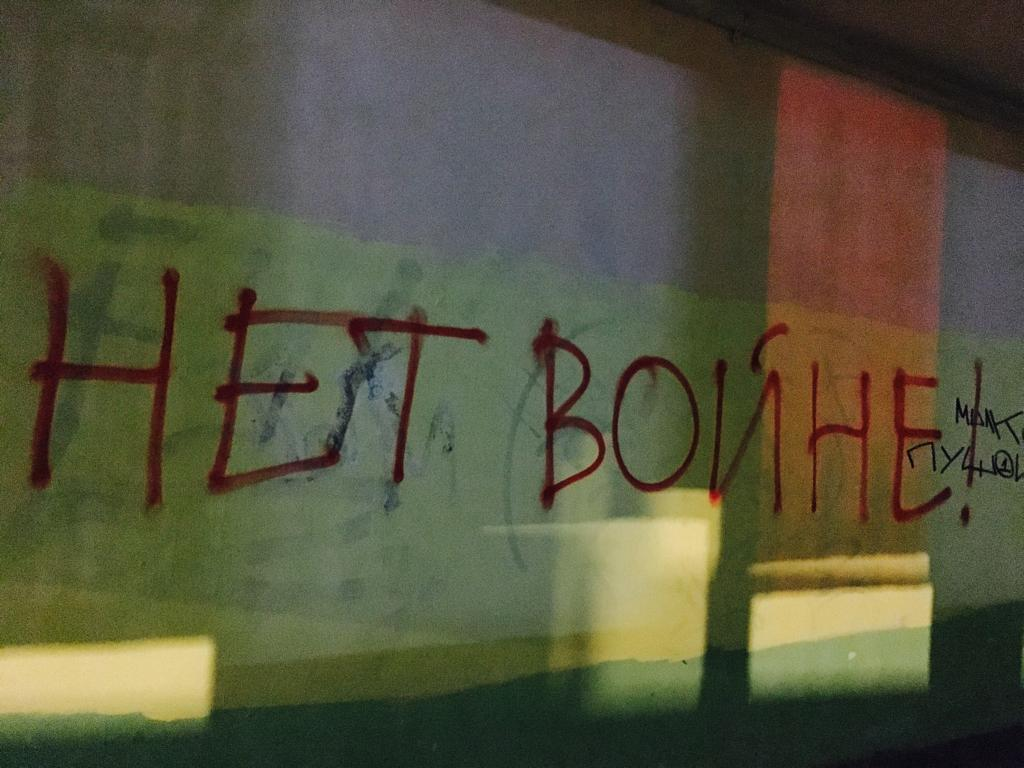
Graffiti on a wall in Moscow saying "No to war"

On 24 February 2022, Russia launched a full-scale invasion of Ukraine, although it was described as a "special military operation" by Putin. The invasion led to international condemnation followed by political, economic and cultural sanctions. The invasion also sparked protests around the world as well as within Russia.

On 21 September 2022, Putin announced a partial mobilization. He also said that his country will use "all means" to "defend itself". Later that day, the minister of defence Sergei Shoigu stated that 300,000 reservists would be called on a compulsory basis. Following president Putin's announcement of partial mobilization, massive Russian emigration began, with estimates of hundreds of thousands of male citizens fleeing, many going to Kazakhstan, Serbia, Georgia and Finland.

In late September 2022, Russian-installed officials in Ukraine organized referendums on annexation of occupied territories of Ukraine, including the Donetsk People's Republic and the Luhansk People's Republic in Russian occupied Donetsk and Luhansk oblasts of Ukraine, as well as the Russian-appointed military administrations of Kherson Oblast and Zaporizhzhia Oblast. Denounced by Ukraine's government and its allies as sham, the official results showed overwhelming majorities in favor of annexation. On 30 September 2022, Putin announced the annexation of Donetsk, Kherson, Luhansk and Zaporizhzhia oblasts of Ukraine in an address to both houses of the Russian parliament. The United Nations, Ukraine, and many other countries condemned the annexation.

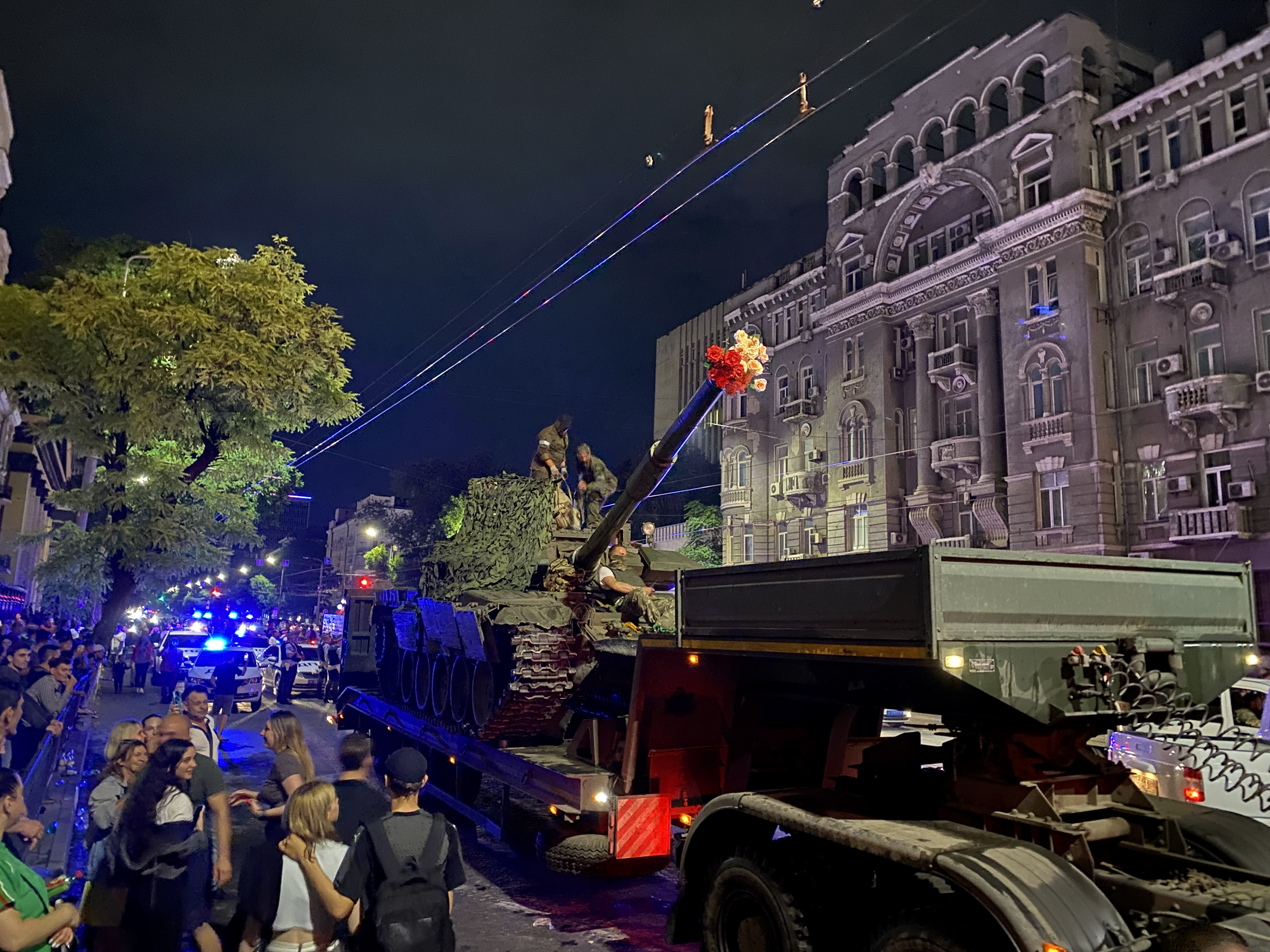
A crowd in Rostov-on-Don watching a Wagner tank with flowers sticking out of its muzzle

On 23 June 2023, the private military company Wagner Group, which had been assisting Russia in its invasion of Ukraine, declared a rebellion against the Russian military. Several cities along the M-4 Highway, including Rostov and Vorenhzh, were seized by Wagner forces, as they began to march towards Moscow. The following day, Wagner forces stepped down and the rebellion ended.

== Relations with the West ==
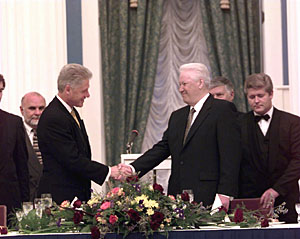
Yeltsin's visit to the United States in 1998, meeting with U.S. President Bill Clinton

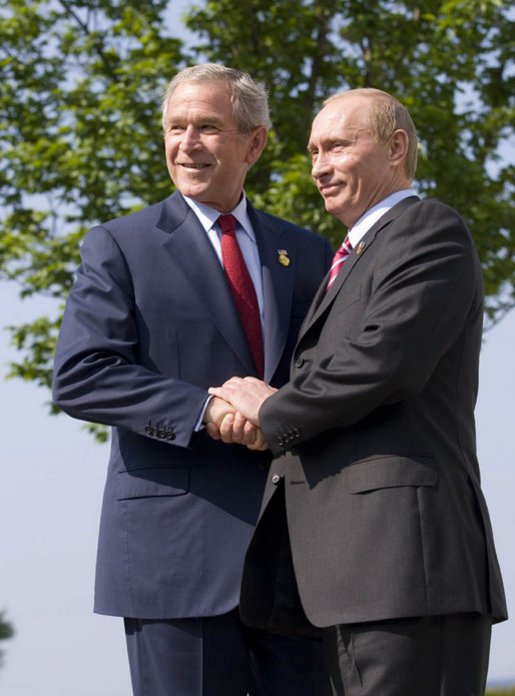
U.S. President George W. Bush and Putin at the 33rd G8 summit, June 2007

In the early period after Russia became independent, Russian foreign policy repudiated Marxism–Leninism as a putative guide to action, emphasizing cooperation with the West in solving regional and global problems, and soliciting economic and humanitarian aid from the West in support of internal economic reforms.

However, although Russia's leaders now described the West as its natural ally, they grappled with defining new relations with the East European states, the new states formed upon the disintegration of Yugoslavia, and Eastern Europe. Russia opposed the expansion of NATO into the former Soviet bloc nations of the Czech Republic, Poland, and Hungary in 1997 and, particularly, the second NATO expansion into Bulgaria, Estonia, Latvia, Lithuania, Romania, Slovakia and Slovenia in 2004. In 1999, Russia opposed the NATO bombing of Yugoslavia for more than two months (see Kosovo War), but later joined NATO peace-keeping forces in the Balkans in June 1999.

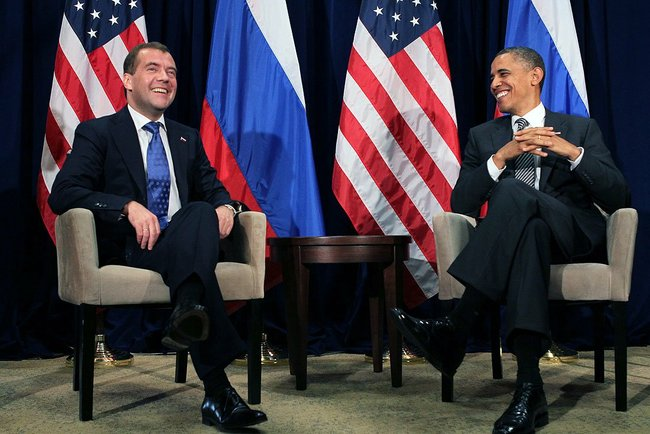
U.S. President Barack Obama and Medvedev at Honolulu, Hawaii, November 2011

Relations with the West have also been strained by Russia's relationship with Belarus. Belarusian President Alexander Lukashenko, an authoritarian leader, has shown no interest in implementing Western-backed economic and political reforms and has aligned his country with Russia, and has no interest in deepening ties with NATO. A union agreement between Russia and Belarus was formed on 2 April 1996. The agreement was tightened, becoming the Union of Russia and Belarus on 3 April 1997. Further strengthening of the union occurred on 25 December 1998, and in 1999.

Under Putin, Russia has sought to strengthen ties with the People's Republic of China by signing the Treaty of Good-Neighborliness and Friendly Cooperation as well building the Trans-Siberian oil pipeline geared toward growing Chinese energy needs. He also made a number of appearances in the media with President of the United States George W. Bush in which the two described each other as "friends".

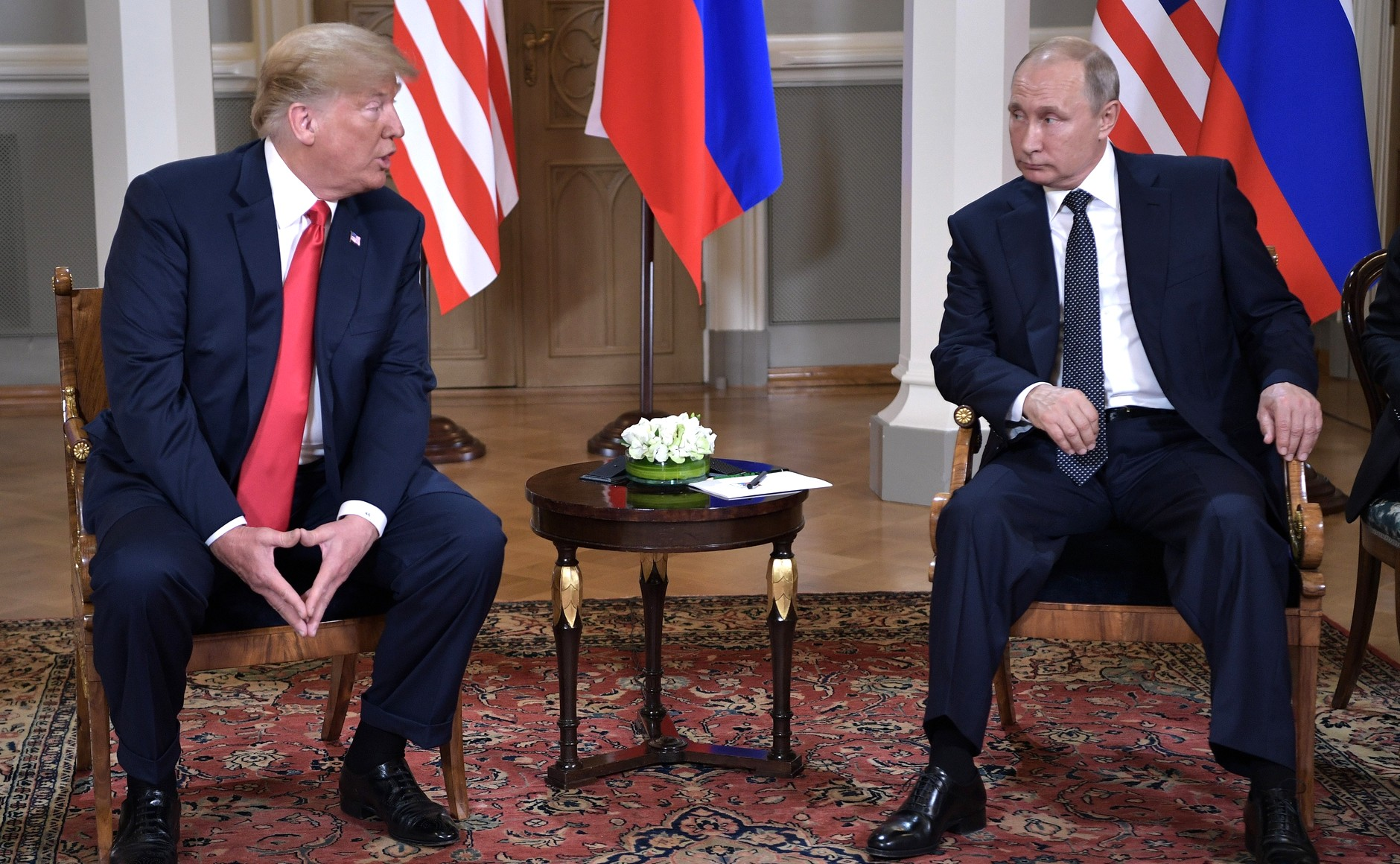
American President Donald Trump and Putin in Helsinki, July 2018

After Barack Obama replaced Bush as the American President, and Dmitry Medvedev succeeded Putin, there was a short-lived improvement of relations known as the Russian reset, lasting roughly from 2009 to 2013.

The relations detoriated again when Putin returned to the presidency in 2012 and Russia annexed Crimea in 2014. The Russian Federation became a subject of the western sanctions in response to these decisions.

The relations with the United States between 2014 and 2022 were mostly strained during the late presidency of Barack Obama and Joe Biden, while briefly turned into mixed ups and downs when Donald Trump served its first term from 2017 to 2021.

The relations became very hostile since 2022, when Russia launched a full-scale invasion of Ukraine, and the West responded with increased sanctions and military aid to Ukraine.

== Leaders of Russia since 1991 ==
Leaders of the Russian Federation since 1991
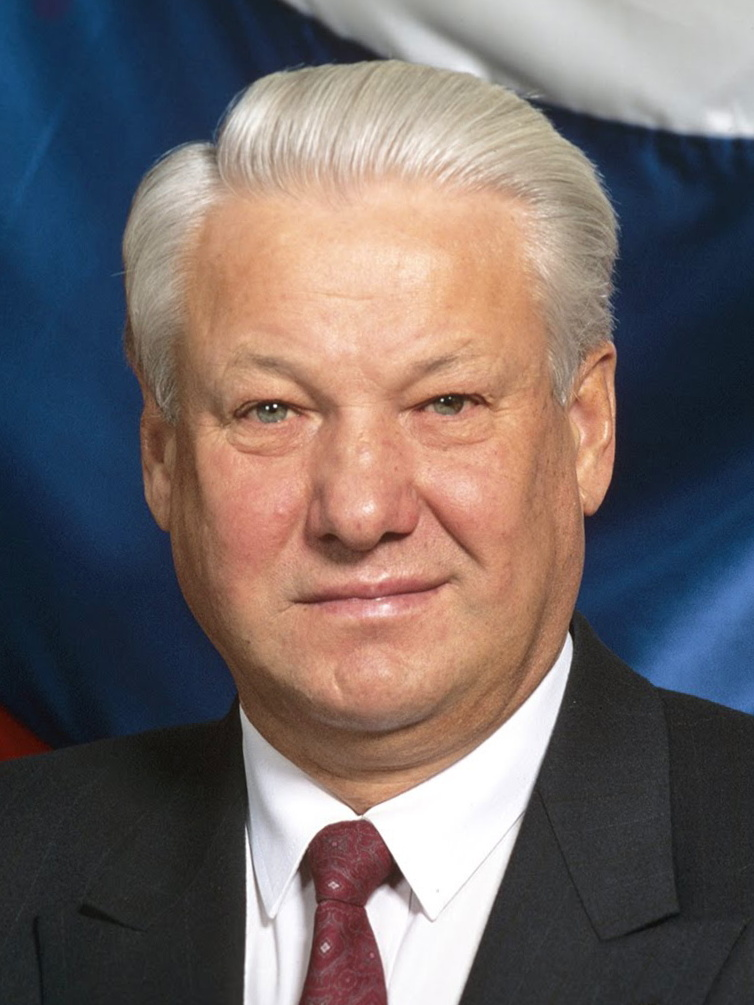
Boris Yeltsin (1991–1999)

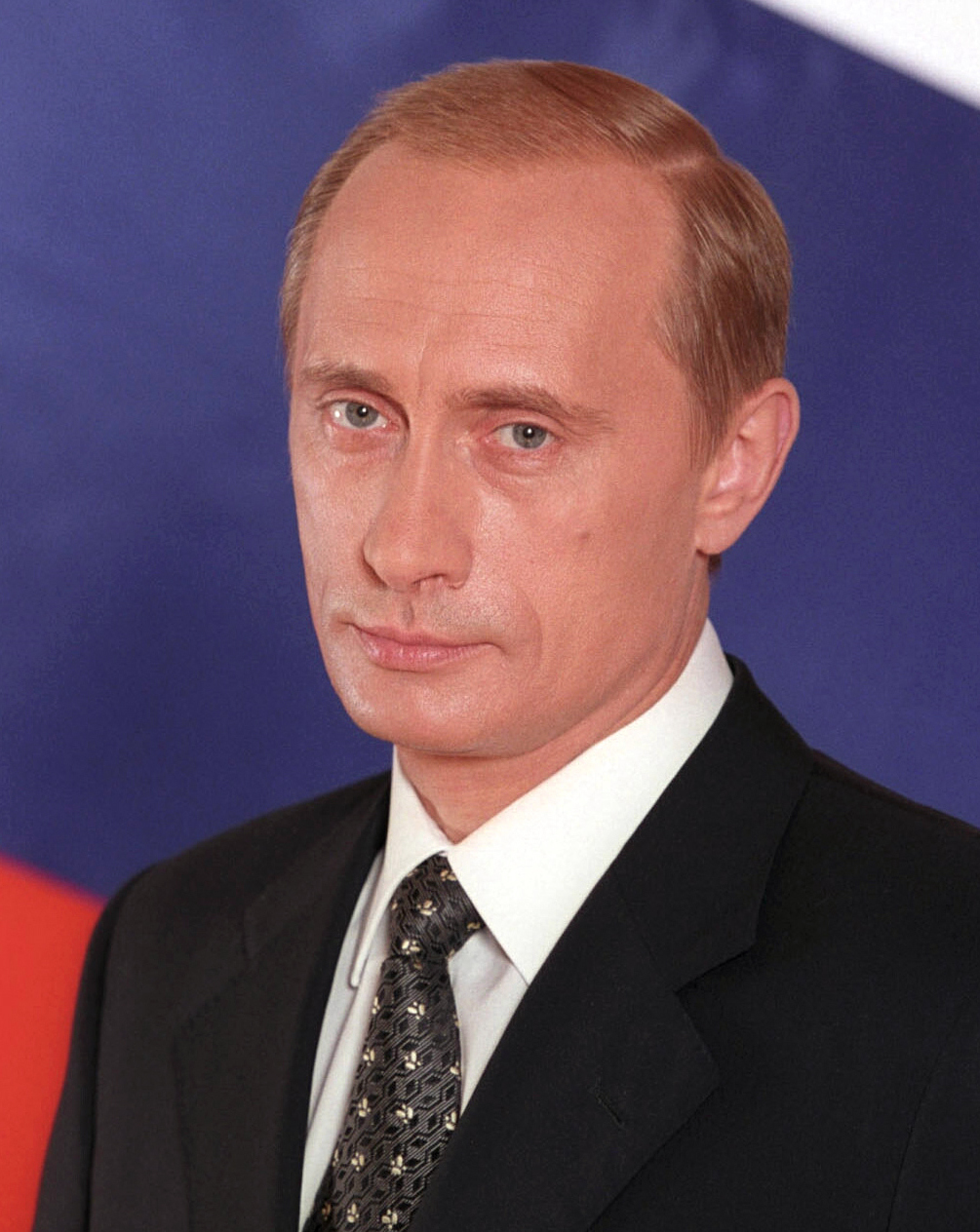
Vladimir Putin (acting 1999–2000; 2000–2008; since 2012)

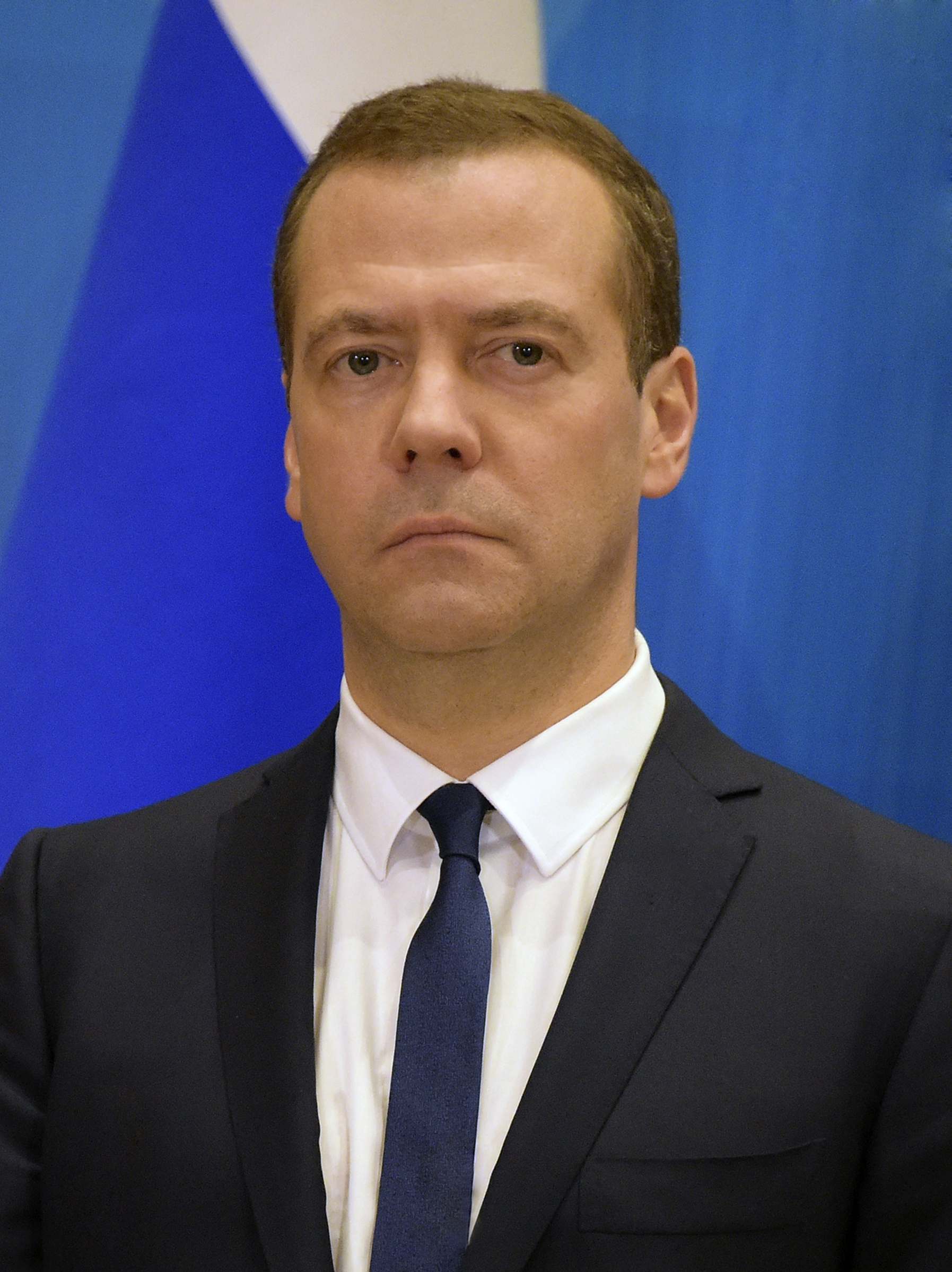
Dmitry Medvedev (2008–2012)

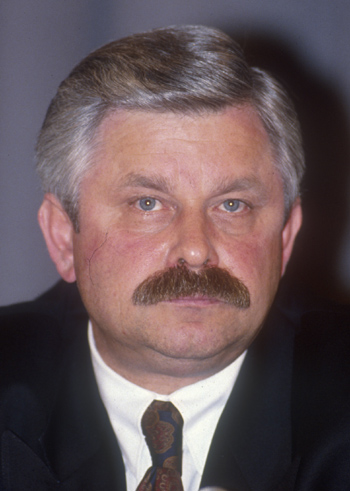
Alexander Rutskoy (acting 1993; disputed)

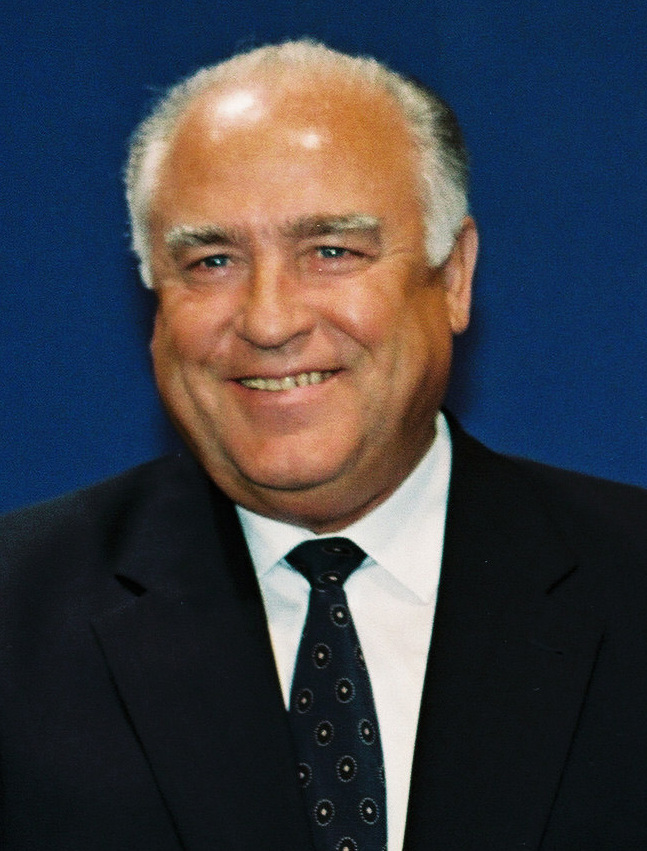
Viktor Chernomyrdin (acting 1996)

== Political system evolution ==
=== Division of power ===
Initially, in 1991-1992, Russia operated as a presidential system, in which Yeltsin was both the head of state and head of government. Yegor Gaidar was appointed acting Prime Minister of the new cabinet in June 1992, thus turning the country into a semi-presidential republic, and after the 1993 constitutional crisis, which presidential forces won, turned into a "super-presidential" (semi-presidential but with strong presidential powers and Prime Minister accountable to the President with the State Duma's approval) system.

Historical V-Dem Democracy Indices for electoral democracy (solid) and liberal democracy (dotted) for Russia

=== Ratings of political freedom ===
==== Democratic backsliding ====
During the Yeltsin's era (1991–1999) and Putin's first term as President (2000–2004), Freedom House rated Russia as "partially free" with scores of 3 (under Yeltsin) and 4 (under early Putin) on both political rights and civil liberties (1 being most free, and 7 least free), which roughly translated on "flawed democracy" status in the 1990s and "hybrid regime" in the early 2000s. In the period from 2005 to 2008, Freedom House rated Russia as "not free" with scores of 6 for political rights and 5 for civil liberties according to its Freedom in the World reports, which is labeled as "authoritarian form of governance".

The Economist Democracy Index called Russia a "hybrid regime" from 2006 to 2010, which shifted in 2011 to an "authoritarian regime description".

Most experts agree that the non-authoritarian governance and genuine political competition ended in Russia in the early 2000s, often citing the year 2003 (elections that turned the State Duma into a rubber stamp) or 2004 (year of Putin's re-election without a meaningful opponent that was considered manipulated or fraudulent).

The term "managed democracy" (a 2004–2012 era under second Putin and Medvedev terms, when the government retained an appearance of democracy and mostly tolerated dissent while passing laws without limits and keeping the fundamental structure authoritarian) has been used to describe the middle stage of the political system of Russia under Vladimir Putin by former Putin advisor Gleb Pavlovsky, by media, and by Russian intellectual Marat Gelman.

The democratic backsliding was cemented by Putin's return to the presidency in 2012, after which the Russian government began passing more repressing laws, like those about "foreign agents" and "gay propaganda". More intensified crackdown on the internal opposition began with the Bolotnaya Square case, assassination of former Deputy Prime Minister Boris Nemtsov, and targeting a main opposition leader Alexei Navalny resulting in criminal cases viewed as politically motivated, poisoning, imprisonment and his death. After 2020 constitutional referendum, Putin's term limits were "zeroed", allowing him to stay in office until 2036.

Since the 2022 invasion of Ukraine, the government imposed a war censorship law which penalized anti-war dissent. This, along with the strengthened influence of the hardline siloviki group, caused a debate on the classification of Russia as a military dictatorship.

== See also ==
- Economic history of the Russian Federation
- Military history of the Russian Federation
- Politics of Russia
- Timeline of largest projects in the Russian economy
- Human rights in Russia
