= Monetary overhang =

Concept in economics

Monetary overhang is a phenomenon in which people have more money holdings than they would normally choose to because of a lack of ability to spend it. In an economy where there is monetary overhang due to shortages, if price controls are removed, the overhang tends to produce a burst of open inflation, or too much money chasing too few goods, thus raising prices. Monetary overhang can also be caused by excess credit.

This is a phenomenon often present with repressed inflation and financial repression, and was common in centrally planned economies like the Soviet Union. The Soviet Union experienced monetary overhang from the mid-1980s onwards. This was reported by the IMF in 1991. Subsequent to this report, the USSR collapsed.
